= John H. Sides =

United States Navy admiral (1904–1978)

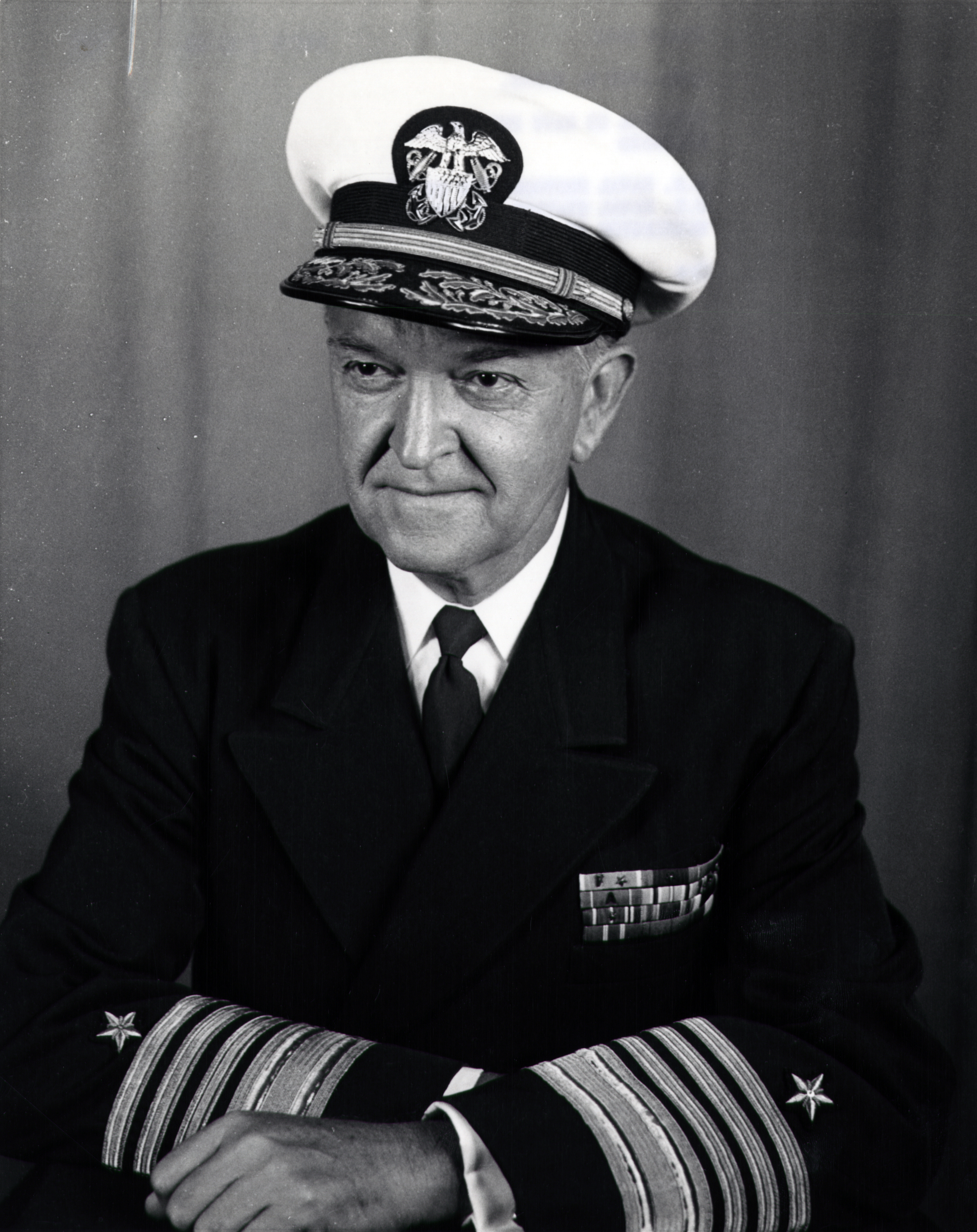
- Born: April 22, 1904; Roslyn, Washington, U.S.
- Died: April 3, 1978 (aged 73); San Diego, California, U.S.
- Burial place: Fort Rosecrans National Cemetery, San Diego, California
- Alma mater: University of Michigan
- Military career
- Allegiance: United States of America
- Branch: United States Navy
- Service years: 1925–1963
- Rank: Admiral
- Nickname: Savvy
- Commands: United States Pacific Fleet
- Conflicts: World War II; Cold War
- Awards: Navy DSM; Legion of Merit (2); Navy Commendation Medal (2)

Admiral John Harold Sides (April 22, 1904 – April 3, 1978) was a four-star admiral in the United States Navy who served as commander in chief of the United States Pacific Fleet from 1960 to 1963 and was known as the father of the Navy's guided-missile program.

== Early career ==
Born in Roslyn, Washington to George Kelley Sides and Estella May Bell, he attended primary and secondary schools in Roslyn, then studied for one year at the University of Washington before being appointed to the United States Naval Academy, from which he graduated ninth in a class of 448 in 1925.

Commissioned ensign, he served four years aboard the battleship Tennessee before being dispatched to the Asiatic Station with the destroyer John D. Edwards to participate in the Yangtze River Patrol. He returned to the United States in June 1931 to study naval ordnance at the Naval Postgraduate School in Annapolis, Maryland, beginning a long career in that field. He completed the ordnance course at the University of Michigan at Ann Arbor, Michigan in 1934, and in May began two years as assistant fire control officer aboard the light cruiser Cincinnati. He served as flag lieutenant on the staff of a battleship division commander from 1936 to 1937, then spent two years in the ammunition section of the Bureau of Ordnance.

In July 1939, he assumed command of the destroyer Tracy, which was assigned to Mine Division 1 and operated out of Pearl Harbor with the Battle Force. He commanded Tracy until November 1940, then reported aboard the light cruiser Savannah as gunnery officer.

== World War II ==
Following the United States entry into World War II, he returned to the Bureau of Ordnance in March 1942 to serve as chief of the ammunition and explosives section, where his work in research and development was instrumental in creating fuses and explosives and devising new formulae.

At the Bureau of Ordnance, Sides nurtured a number of early rocket projects, often against high-level institutional opposition. One notable success was the High Velocity Aircraft Rocket (HVAR), a 5-inch air-to-ground rocket that was used in Europe against trucks and tanks and was being produced at the rate of 40,000 per day by the end of the war. "He was a real pioneer of the Navy rocket programs," recalled Thomas F. Dixon, HVAR project officer under Sides' supervision and later chief designer of the engines for the Atlas, Thor, Jupiter, Redstone, and Saturn rockets. "All the way through it was a fight with the admirals. Caltech's professor of physics, Dr. Charles Lauritsen, had developed a barrage rocket - ideal for landings to clean up the banks. When we brought this to the Chief of the Bureau of Ordnance, however, his general reaction was, 'Don't put rockets on my battleships, cruisers, or destroyers.'"

Sides returned to sea in October 1944 in command of Mine Division 8 for combat duty in the Pacific theater, where the Navy credited him with "contributing materially to the success of the Okinawa invasion." In April 1945, he became commander of Destroyer Squadron 47, and remained in that command until the end of the war.

After the war, he was assigned as assistant chief of staff for operations and training on the staff of the commander of battleships and cruisers in the Atlantic Fleet. In September 1947 he reported for instruction at the National War College in Washington, D.C.

== Father of the guided-missile Navy ==
In June 1948, he began two years as deputy to the assistant chief of naval operations for guided missiles, Rear Admiral Daniel V. Gallery. Over the next decade, he would build a reputation for missile expertise and eventually become known as the father of the Navy's guided-missile program.

=== Revolt of the Admirals ===
As deputy assistant chief of naval operations for guided missiles, Sides risked his career by participating in the Revolt of the Admirals, an episode of civil-military conflict in which high-ranking Navy officials publicly clashed with their Air Force counterparts and civilian superiors over the future of the United States military. Testifying as a guided-missile expert before the House Armed Services Committee on October 11, 1949, Sides warned that the Air Force's B-36 strategic bomber would not be able to penetrate Russian defenses to deliver its nuclear payload as claimed, since the United States already possessed supersonic guided missiles that would "seek out and destroy the really fast jet bombers now on the drawing boards" and the Russians had likely inherited a similar capability from the German Wasserfall missile development program and personnel they had captured at the end of World War II.

When Sides became eligible for early promotion to rear admiral a month later, the selection board was perceived to be stacked against captains who had participated in the Revolt because it included none of the top admirals involved in the controversy. Passed over as expected, in 1950 he took command of the heavy cruiser Albany for a twelve-month tour in the Atlantic Fleet. Sides had hoped to captain the first guided-missile cruiser, which the Navy had expected to put in operation by that year, but its development schedule had slipped due to problems with the sound barrier. The first guided-missile cruiser would not become operational until 1955.

=== Regulus cruise missile ===
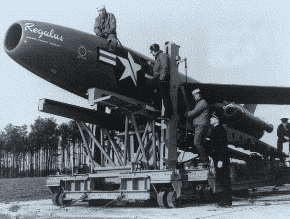
Regulus I cruise missile

In 1951, Sides became head of the technical section in the office of the director of guided missiles in the Department of Defense, K.T. Keller, the former president and chairman of the board of the Chrysler Corporation who had been appointed "missile czar" in October 1950 with a mandate to unify the independent service missile programs. Keller ordered the services to shift from experimentation to production on five missile projects: the Army's Nike; the Air Force's Matador; and the Navy's Terrier, Sparrow, and Regulus. As Keller's Navy deputy, Sides was responsible for producing all three Navy missiles, and was credited with being, "as much as any man, the father of the Regulus cruise missile." "He was the real 'thinking' admiral in the guided missile field, and an outstanding man," recalled Regulus project manager Robert F. Freitag.

=== Fleet ballistic missile ===
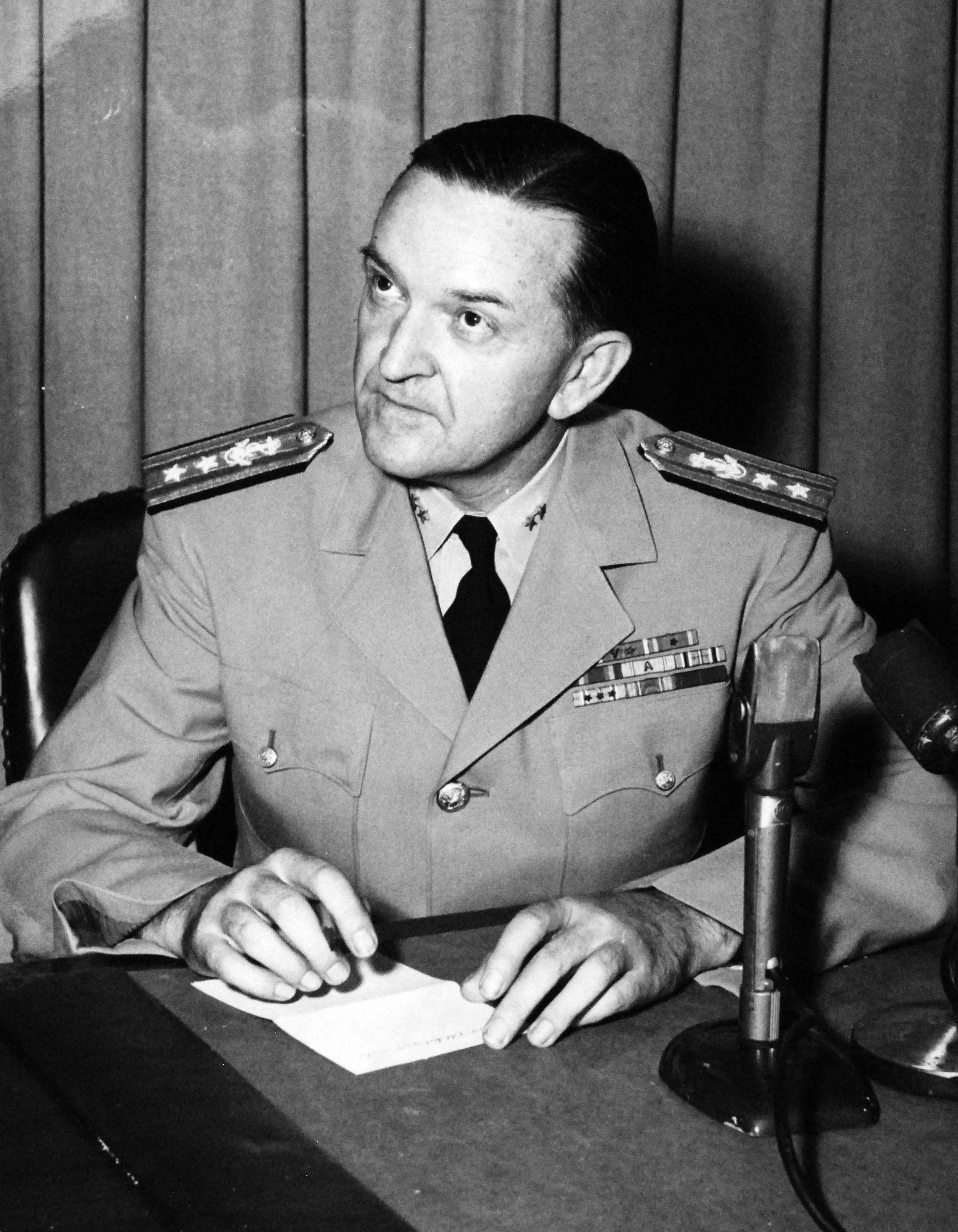
Rear Admiral Sides in 1952

Sides was promoted to rear admiral in 1952 as director of the guided-missile division in the office of the chief of naval operations. In that role, he directed the Navy's entire guided-missile program for almost four years, and played an influential and initially adversarial role in the development of the Polaris fleet ballistic missile (FBM).

As top missile advisor to the chief of naval operations, Admiral Robert B. Carney, Sides convinced Carney to veto several early FBM proposals, including a 1952 bid by Freitag and other Navy officers for a weaponized version of the Viking rocket, whose launch from the rolling deck of a ship had already been demonstrated. Since the FBM would have to be funded internally by siphoning funds from existing Navy programs, Carney and Sides both judged that the research costs associated with the FBM were too open-ended to justify sacrificing present combat capability for an unproven future capability.

In 1954, Freitag and his colleagues at the Bureau of Aeronautics (BuAer) again tried to engage the Navy in FBM development by funneling their research to a secret study committee chaired by Massachusetts Institute of Technology president James R. Killian. The Killian Committee had a charter to unify the ballistic missile programs scattered among the services, and enthusiastically recommended that the Navy develop a fleet-based intermediate-range ballistic missile (IRBM). This external endorsement by a distinguished independent evaluator persuaded the chief of BuAir, Rear Admiral James S. Russell, to fully commit the bureau to FBM development.

However, there was no guarantee that any amount of manpower or money could create the components required for a viable FBM system, which still lacked accurate systems for guidance, fire control, and navigation; adequate metals and materials for fabrication; a compact nuclear warhead with sufficient yield; and a solid rocket propellant to replace liquid fuels that were too dangerous to be used at sea. "There wasn't even a concept as to a launching system," recalled Admiral Arleigh A. Burke, Carney's successor as chief of naval operations.

On Sides' advice, Carney again concluded that a full-fledged FBM program remained premature, and in July directed BuAer to discontinue all efforts to expand FBM development. However, Russell exercised his statutory prerogative as bureau chief to appeal directly to James H. Smith, assistant secretary of the Navy for air, who kept the project alive until Carney was succeeded by Burke on August 17, 1955. Within 24 hours of being sworn in, Burke summoned Sides, Freitag, and other Navy missile experts to his office for a briefing on the FBM research studies. By the end of the meeting, Burke had reversed Carney's veto and committed the Navy to an all-out FBM development program, directing Sides and Freitag to work out the operational details.

Sides handled the Navy's side of negotiations over how exactly to implement the Killian Committee's recommendations, which called for the Navy to develop a ship-launched FBM similar to the Army's Jupiter IRBM. On September 13, 1955, President Dwight D. Eisenhower accepted the Killian Committee recommendations and directed the Navy to design a sea-based support system for Jupiter. Sides and the Navy protested that liquid-fuel rockets like Jupiter were too dangerous for shipboard use and pushed instead for submarine-launched solid-fuel rockets for tactical use against enemy submarine bases. However, on November 17, 1955, Secretary of Defense Charles E. Wilson ordered the Navy to join the Army on Jupiter development, and specified that all such missile development would not be externally funded but would have to be carved out of the existing Navy budget.

In response, Burke created the Special Projects Office, a new organization with a mandate to develop a submarine-launched solid-fuel fleet ballistic missile. The Special Projects Office reported directly to Burke and the secretary of the Navy, an unprecedented bypass of the Navy bureaus that signalled the Navy's commitment to the FBM concept. To direct the Special Projects Office, at Sides' persistent suggestion, Burke selected Sides' former deputy, Rear Admiral William F. Raborn, Jr., whose phenomenal success in that role would earn him renown as the father of Polaris.

=== Guided-missile cruiser ===
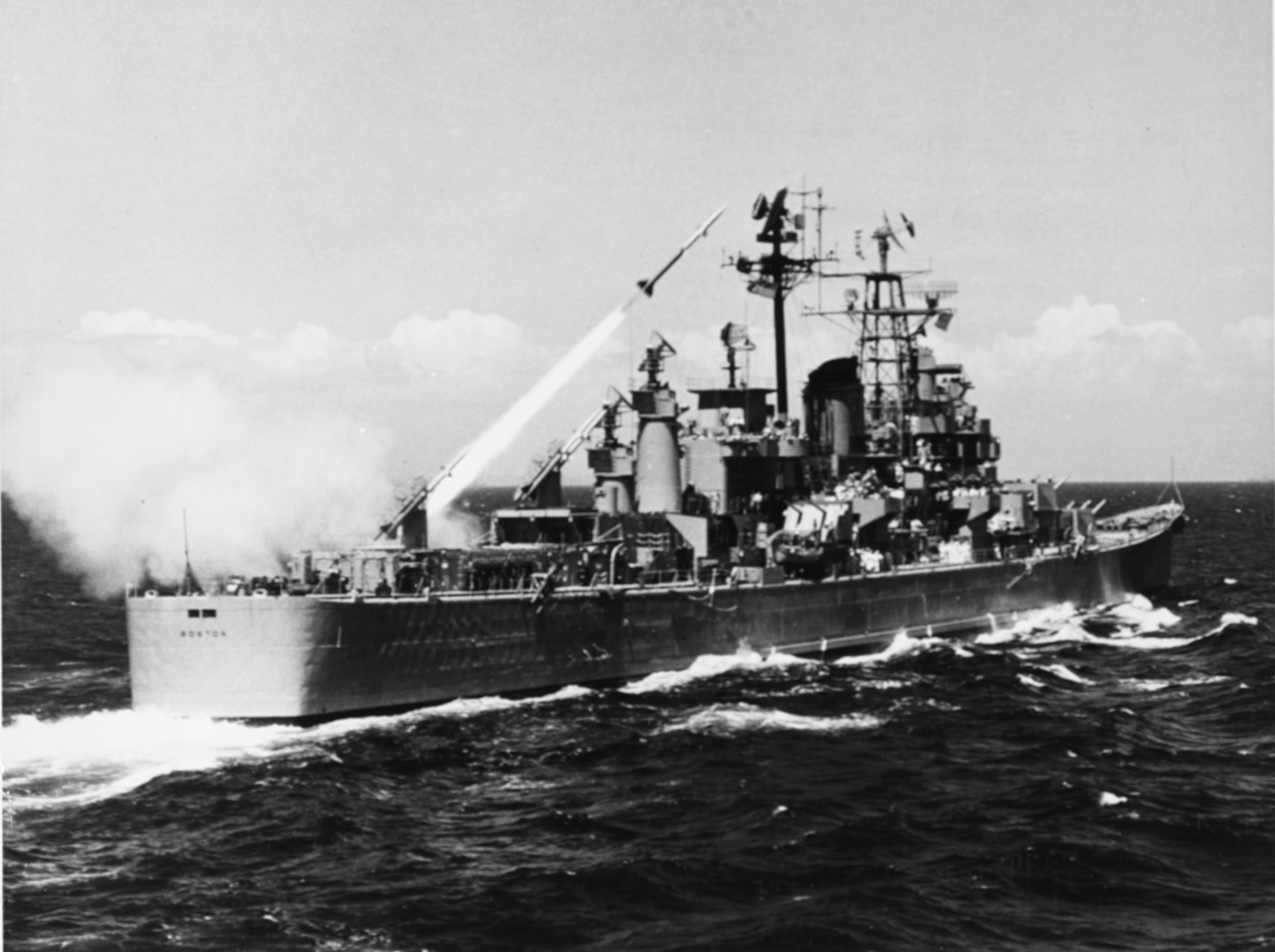
USS Boston (CAG-1) firing Terrier guided missile, August 1956.

Sides returned to sea in January 1956 as the first seagoing flag officer to command a guided-missile cruiser group, Cruiser Division 6, which included the guided-missile cruisers Boston and Canberra. At the long-delayed commissioning of the Navy's first guided-missile cruiser, Boston, in November 1955, Sides declared that the new ship marked a fundamental change in sea warfare because it was now possible to defend the fleet against bombers without losing several fighter planes in the process. "It is my personal opinion that within five years, the Navy will have dozens of guided missile ships. They should include not only vessels carrying antiaircraft missiles but also larger ships with surface to surface missile capability."

In March 1956, the Navy displayed its first combat-ready antiaircraft missile, Terrier, aboard Boston. Sides said at the time that he foresaw within five years "a family of surface-to-air guided missile ships...dozens of ships of the cruiser, frigate, destroyer and battleship classes." Sides commanded the cruiser division for only four months before being recalled to Washington in April 1956 to become deputy to the special assistant to the Secretary of Defense for guided missiles, Eger V. Murphree.

=== Weapons Systems Evaluation Group ===
Sides was promoted to vice admiral in 1957 to serve as director of the Pentagon's Weapons Systems Evaluation Group (WSEG) from 1957 to 1960. As the chief weapons expert for the Joint Chiefs of Staff, he assured the public that despite apparent setbacks in the space race with the Soviet Union, the American missile program was developing well.

On August 21, the Soviet Union successfully tested the first ICBM, a feat reported by TASS on August 27. In October, following the unexpected Russian launch of the first satellite, Sputnik 1, Sides spoke before the American Rocket Society and Institute of Aeronautical Sciences and disputed the Russian report of a successful ICBM test, claiming the reported August flight might actually have been an "errant sputnik" that failed to make its orbit. He was "certain that the enormous effort which went into the development and launching of Sputnik was at the expense" of the Soviet ICBM program, and asserted that "winning the race for development of long-range weapons systems is more important than getting up the first satellite." His speech was regarded as a vigorous defense of the Eisenhower administration's decision to separate the satellite program from ballistic missile development.

After the dramatic failure of the first United States attempt to launch a satellite on December 6, 1957, Sides spoke at a conference of the American Management Association on January 15, 1958, where he reiterated that the nation's development of long-range missiles was "progressing very well" and complained that a false impression had been created by missiles that failed in early tests. "It just so happened that about the time of the sputnik launchings, our intermediate and intercontinental ballistics missile flight-test programs were getting into high gear; and not being blessed with a Siberian proving ground, where we might do our testing in private, every malfunctioning test vehicle was given a play in all the media of public information. The impression was unwittingly created that we were really on our uppers, when, as a matter of fact, each one of these so-called unsuccessful missiles yielded a great deal of the very information it was fired to obtain. In ten years of missile experience I cannot recall a missile system in which similar casualties were not encountered in the early test flights. But in each case we have determined the causes, corrected the deficiencies and gone on to develop a successful weapon system."

== Commander in Chief, U.S. Pacific Fleet ==
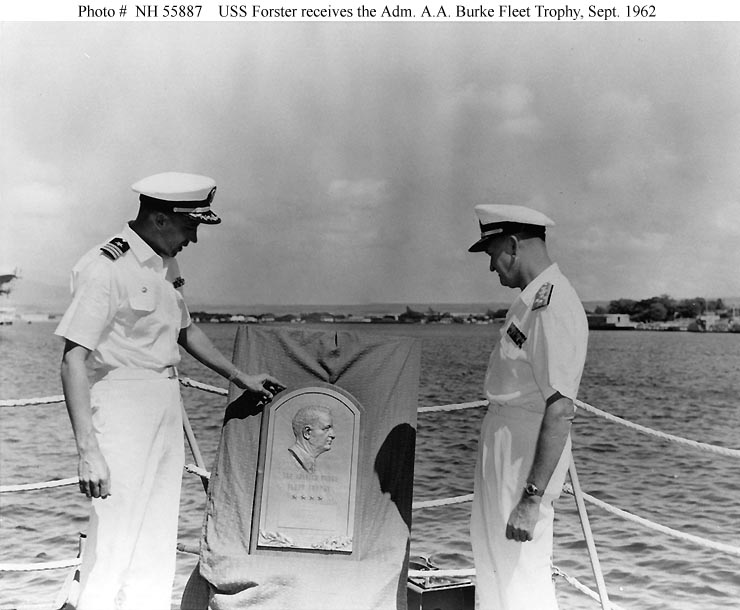
As commander in chief, Pacific Fleet (right), awarding Arleigh Burke Fleet Trophy to USS Forster (DER-334), September 19, 1962.

On June 1, 1960, President Dwight D. Eisenhower nominated Sides for promotion to admiral as commander in chief of the U.S. Pacific Fleet (CINCPACFLT). Because of Sides' background, his appointment was interpreted as heralding a new emphasis on missile warfare. Sides relieved Admiral Herbert G. Hopwood on August 30. His command was responsible for guarding the Far East and the United States West Coast, and included the First Fleet, the Seventh Fleet, 400 ships, 3,000 aircraft, and half a million men.

Sides was CINCPACFLT during the early stages of American involvement in the Vietnam War. In November 1961, en route to Bangkok to repay a visit to Pearl Harbor by the commander in chief of Thailand's Navy, Sides stopped overnight in Saigon with his wife. Asked about rumors of Seventh Fleet units operating in Vietnamese waters, Sides replied, "The center of gravity of the Seventh Fleet is always near a troubled area," but declared there was "no intention" of using the Seventh Fleet "in the immediate future" in any role having to do with the Vietnamese crisis. "But I am not saying it could not happen."

As one of the few active four-star admirals, Sides was occasionally considered for other four-star jobs. In 1961, Newsweek handicapped his odds of succeeding Burke as chief of naval operations at 15-1. He was a candidate to replace Admiral Robert L. Dennison as the NATO Supreme Allied Commander Atlantic in 1963, but was passed over in favor of Admiral Harold Page Smith.

He was relieved by Admiral U.S. Grant Sharp, Jr. on September 30, 1963, and retired from the Navy on October 1.

== Personal life ==
In retirement, he became a consultant to the Lockheed Aircraft Company in California. President Lyndon B. Johnson appointed him to the President's Foreign Intelligence Advisory Board on August 10, 1965.

He married the former Virginia Eloise Roach of Inez, Kentucky on June 12, 1929, and they had one daughter.

His decorations include the Navy Distinguished Service Medal, Yangtze Service Medal; the Legion of Merit with gold star and Combat V, awarded for his service as chief of the ammunition and explosives section of the Bureau of Ordnance during World War II; two Navy Unit commendations; the American Defense Service Medal; the American Campaign Medal; the Asiatic-Pacific Campaign Medal; the World War II Victory Medal; and the National Defense Service Medal. He received the rank of comendador in the Order of Naval Merit from Brazil. He was a member of the chemical society Phi Lambda Upsilon, the research society Sigma Xi, and the graduate engineering society Iota Alpha. He was a Fellow of the American Rocket Society.

He received a master of science degree from the University of Michigan at Ann Arbor in 1934.

He is the namesake of the guided-missile frigate Sides, whose coat of arms contains a scaled horse's head that represents a knight on a chessboard, evoking Sides' personal reputation as a man of knightly character and integrity and as a naval officer experienced in the strategies of sea warfare. The National Defense Industrial Association confers the annual Admiral John H. Sides Award on select members of its Strike, Land Attack and Air Defense Division "in recognition of meritorious service and noteworthy contribution to effective government-industry advancement in the fields of strike, land attack, and air defense warfare."

He died of a heart seizure on the Coronado golf course near San Diego, California at the age of 73, and was buried in Fort Rosecrans National Cemetery.

== Decorations ==

1st Row	Navy Distinguished Service Medal		
2nd Row	Legion of Merit w/ Gold Star and "V" Device	Navy Commendation Medal w/ Gold Star	Yangtze Service Medal
3rd Row	American Defense Service Medal w/ Atlantic Clasp	American Campaign Medal	Asiatic Pacific Campaign Medal w/ three bronze service stars
4th Row	World War II Victory Medal	National Defense Service Medal	Order of Naval Merit (Brazil))

Military offices
Preceded by Herbert G. Hopwood	Commander in Chief, United States Pacific Fleet; August 30, 1960–September 30, 1963	Succeeded by U.S. Grant Sharp, Jr.
