= Herbert G. Hopwood =

Herbert Gladstone Hopwood
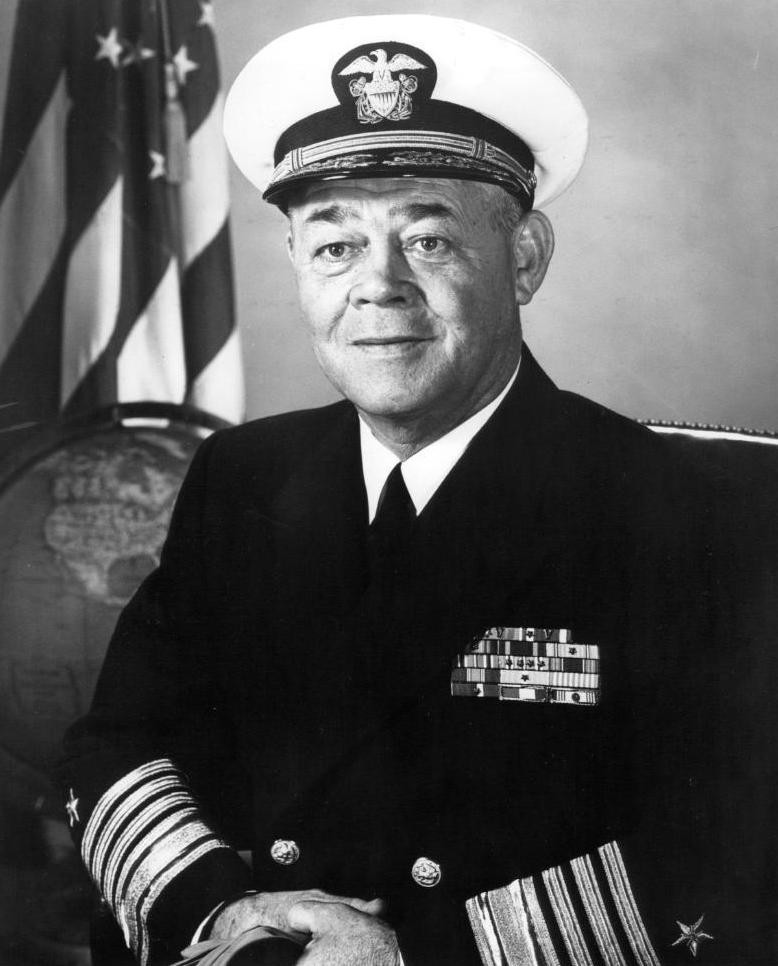
- Born: November 23, 1898; Shamokin, Pennsylvania, U.S.
- Died: September 15, 1966 (aged 67); Livingston, New Jersey, U.S.
- Burial place: Arlington National Cemetery
- Military career
- Allegiance: United States of America
- Branch: United States Navy
- Service years: 1918–1960
- Rank: Admiral
- Commands: United States Pacific Fleet
- Conflicts: World War I World War II; Cold War; Korean War
- Awards: Navy DSM; Legion of Merit (2)

Admiral Herbert Gladstone Hopwood (November 23, 1898 – September 15, 1966) was a four-star admiral in the United States Navy who served as commander in chief of the United States Pacific Fleet from 1958 to 1960.

== Early career ==
Born in Shamokin, Pennsylvania to Kendrick Hopwood and Anna Williams, he graduated from the United States Naval Academy in 1919.

His first assignments were to the battleships New Jersey and Oklahoma during the last months of World War I. Between the wars, he served aboard the transport America in the Asiatic Station, the battleship Florida, the destroyer Hopkins, the fleet replenishment oiler Ramapo, and the heavy cruiser Indianapolis.

He commanded the destroyer Hart from 1928 to 1929, commanded the destroyer Mahan from 1938 to 1939, and served as executive officer of the destroyer tender Melville from 1939 to 1940. Staff assignments included tours as an instructor in ordnance and gunnery at the Naval Academy; as aide to the commandant of the Fourth Naval District; and afloat as flag lieutenant on the staffs of Commander Destroyers, Battle Force and Commander Scouting Force.

From the beginning of World War II to June 1944, he served in the Bureau of Naval Personnel, with additional duty on the Joint Chiefs of Staff Planning Staff. As Director of Planning and Control in the Bureau of Naval Personnel, he implemented the program that dramatically expanded the Navy to meet wartime personnel requirements, and was promoted to captain. He went to sea as commanding officer of the light cruiser Cleveland from August 14, 1944 to early 1945, participating in the capture of Peleliu, Angaur, and Ngesebus; and the recapture of Corregidor and Mariveles.

== Flag officer ==
After the war, he returned to Washington D.C. for a series of staff assignments and promotion to rear admiral. He served successively as assistant chief of naval personnel; as assistant chief of naval operations; as budget director of the Navy from 1946 to 1950, in which role he played a minor part in the Revolt of the Admirals when his testimony before a Congressional committee suggested that Secretary of Defense Louis Johnson had usurped the powers of Congress by unilaterally refusing to spend appropriated funds; and as deputy comptroller of the Navy Department from 1950 to 1952.

He went to sea in command of Cruiser Division Three and Cruiser Destroyer Force, Pacific Fleet from 1952 to 1953, and was assigned as chief of staff and aide to the Commander in Chief of the Pacific Fleet from 1953 to 1955. He was promoted to vice admiral in 1955 and appointed commander of the First Fleet, then served as Deputy Chief of Naval Operations (Logistics) from 1957 to 1958.

On February 1, 1958, he was promoted to admiral and appointed commander in chief of the Pacific Fleet (CINCPACFLT), a command that included about 400 ships, half a million men, and 3,000 aircraft. On August 23, the Second Taiwan Strait Crisis erupted when People's Liberation Army forces began shelling Republic of China positions on the disputed islands of Quemoy and Matsu. Hopwood deployed the Seventh Fleet into the Taiwan Strait to help the Nationalist government protect Quemoy's supply lines, as directed by Admiral Harry D. Felt, Commander in Chief, Pacific (CINCPAC).

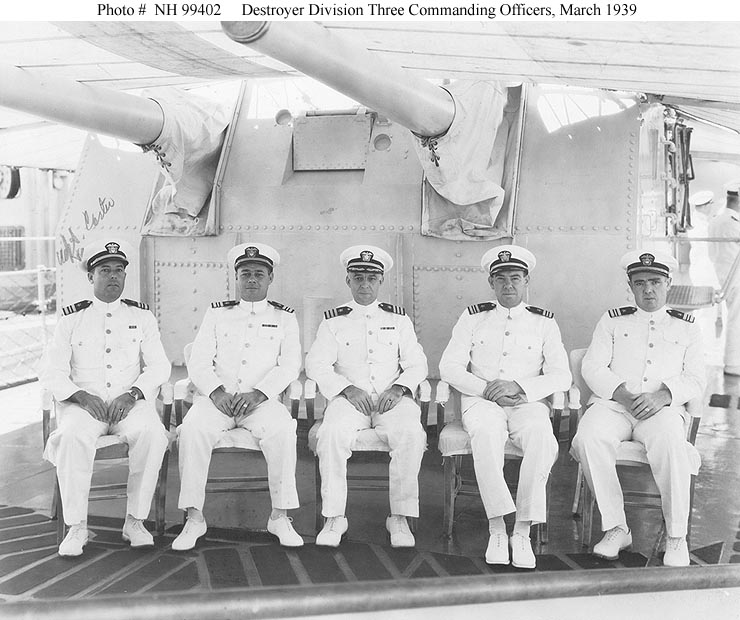
Hopwood as commanding officer of Mahan (second from right), March 21, 1939.

In January 1960, Hopwood participated in the first public demonstration of a new Navy communications system that used the moon as a radio relay to exchange teletype messages between Hopwood in Hawaii and Chief of Naval Operations Arleigh Burke in Washington, D.C. In June, he hosted President Dwight D. Eisenhower at Kaneohe Marine Corps Air Station when the President took a brief holiday in Hawaii following a trip to the Far East. He was relieved by Admiral John H. Sides on August 30, 1960 and retired from the Navy on September 1.

== Personal life ==
After retiring from the Navy, he worked as vice president in charge of operations for the Grace Steamship Company until 1964.

He married the former Jean Fulton and they had three children: son Herbert Gladstone Jr., an officer in the Navy Medical Corps and later a prominent obstetrician in Arlington, Virginia; son Kendrick Alexander; and daughter Jean. They lived in retirement in the Short Hills section of Millburn, New Jersey.

He was awarded with Navy Distinguished Service Medal during Cold War and twice with the Legion of Merit for his World War II service, once as Director of Planning and Control in the Bureau of Naval Personnel and once as commanding officer of the light cruiser Cleveland.

He is the namesake of Hopwood Junior High School in Saipan, originally the first institution of higher learning in the Commonwealth of the Northern Mariana Islands, which was renamed in his honor in the late 1950s when he was Commanding Officer for the Northern Marianas as CINCPACFLT.

He died at St. Barnabas Hospital in Livingston, New Jersey at the age of 67, and is buried with his wife in Arlington National Cemetery.

== Decorations ==

1st Row	Navy Distinguished Service Medal	Legion of Merit w/ Gold Star and "V" Device	Navy Commendation Medal w/ Gold Star and "V" Device
2nd Row	World War I Victory Medal w/ Escort Clasp	Yangtze Service Medal	American Defense Service Medal w/ Atlantic Clasp
3rd Row	American Campaign Medal	Asiatic Pacific Campaign Medal w/ four bronze service stars	World War II Victory Medal
4th Row	National Defense Service Medal	Korean Service Medal w/ one service star	United Nations Korea Medal
5th Row	Philippine Liberation Medal w/ one star	Philippine Republic Presidential Unit Citation	Republic of Korea Presidential Unit Citation

Navy Distinguished Service Medal Citation

The President of the United States of America takes pleasure in presenting the Navy Distinguished Service Medal to Admiral Herbert Gladstone Hopwood, United States Navy, for exceptionally meritorious and distinguished service in a position of great responsibility to the Government of the United States as Commander in Chief, U.S. Pacific Fleet, from February 1958 to August 1960. Exercising sound judgment and marked planning and organizational ability, which have had a powerful impact on our national posture, he materially strengthened Pacific Fleet striking forces with establishment of the U.S. Naval Defense Forces, Eastern Pacific; Barrier Forces, Pacific; and Antisubmarine Defense Force, Pacific.

1st Legion of Merit Citation

The President of the United States takes pleasure in presenting the LEGION OF MERIT to CAPTAIN HERBERT G. HOPWOOD, UNITED STATES NAVY for service as set forth in the following:

"For exceptionally meritorious conduct in the performance of outstanding services to the Government of the United States as Director of Planning and Control, Bureau of Naval Personnel, Washington, D.C., from July 1, 1941, to June 2, 1944. Charged with the responsibility of the initiation, coordination and fulfillment of the personnel program upon which the expansion of the Navy has been based, Captain Hopwood formulated and executed the plans for this vital expansion project so effectively that in no instance has the commissioning of a naval ship been delayed by the lack of trained personnel to man it. Inspiring others connected with this assignment to extraordinary effort by his splendid administrative ability and brilliant initiative, he skillfully directed the expeditious development of efficient systems of classification, training and distribution, resulting in the greatest economy in the nation's manpower. Captain Hopwood's expert guidance and whole-hearted cooperation were of invaluable assistance to the General Staff of the Army and members of Congressional Naval Committees in meeting and solving numerous problems and personnel questions common to both of the services and contributed materially to the progressive success of the war effort."

2nd Legion of Merit Citation

The President of the United States of America takes pleasure in presenting a Gold Star in lieu of a Second Award of the Legion of Merit to Captain Herbert Gladstone Hopwood, United States Navy, for service as set forth in the following:

"For exceptional meritorious conduct in the performance of outstanding services to the Government of the United States as Commanding Officer of the USS Cleveland during operations against Japanese forces in the Southwest Pacific Area, from August 14, 1944, to July 3, 1945. Employing his ship with maximum effectiveness, Captain Hopwood conducted devastating bombardments of hostile shore installations in support of our landings on enemy-held territory, maintaining a high standard of fighting efficiency throughout a prolonged period of intensive combat. A brilliant leader, Captain Hopwood assured the precise execution of each important assignment and, by his alert and cool command of the CLEVELAND, contributed immeasurably to the success of many Allied campaigns in a vital theater of war. His expert seamanship, resolute determination and unwavering devotion to duty reflect the highest credit upon himself and the United States Naval Service"

Captain Hopwood is authorized to wear the Combat "V"

NAVY COMMENDATION RIBBON CITATION

The Commander Seventh Fleet takes pleasure in commanding

Captain Herbert Gladstone Hopwood, U.S.Navy.

For service as set forth in the following citation

For distinguishing himself by excellent service in action as Commanding Officer of a cruiser during the period 13–16 February 1945. Throughout this period, in direct support of the various phases of the U.S Army landings at Mariveles Bay and Corregidor Island, Luzon, Philippine Islands, he rendered effective support of all units involved, and although his ship was subjected to heavy enemy fire he destroyed gun installations at point blank range and provided accurate counter-battery fire. His actions contributed greatly to the saving of many lives of the assault forces and materially assisted in their successful landings. For his courege and skill throughout he is commended and authorized to wear the Commendation Ribbon. "

Captain Hopwood is authorized to wear the Combat "V"

T.C.KINKAID

ADMIRAL U.S.NAVY

COMMANDER SEVENTH FLEET.

Citation for the Peruvian Naval Cross order of Commander.

Rear Admiral Herbert G. Hopwood, U.S. Navy, Commander of Cruisers and Destroyers of the Pacific Fleet, through his cooperation and assistance has rendered a valuable service to the Navy of Peru. Through the Facilities of his command, Admiral Hopwood has provided many repairs, inspections and tests for the Peruvian Squadron. In addition to these, Admiral Hopwood has made possible special instruction for the Peruvian Officers not available elsewhere, concerning highly technical instruments and their components. These special services have contributed to the successful completion of the training period without delay or interruption and thereby increases its value by adding to the experience, training and efficiency of all Peruvian Naval Personnel participating. Admiral Hopwood has therefore rendered a definite service to the Navy of Peru and decidedly contributed to the feeling of friendship and cooperation the exists between the Navy of Peru and that of the United States of America.

To accompany the award of the medal of paoting with grand cordan

To Admiral herbert gladstone hopwood, united states navy

For exceptional contributions to sino-american relations during his tenure in the position of great responsibility as commander-in-chief united states pacific fleet. Admiral hopwood's contributions toward mutual cooperation between the naval forces of the united states and the republic of china have been a major factor in the improvement of the readiness, state of training, and high morale of the chinese navy. His prompt action in providing timely support to the forces of the republic of china during the taiwan strait crisis of 1958 was instrumental in bringing to a halt the chinese communist bombardment of the kinmen island complex and, consequently, in defeating the attempts of the chinese communists to break up the chain of western pacific defense, his continuing efforts in providing ships and aircraft of the united states pacific fleet to work not only with the ships of the chinese navy, but also with the aircraft of the chinese air force, have resulted in a greatly enhanced combat capability of these forces, his outstanding qualities of leadership, his professional knowledge, and his personal warmth have won for him the respect and admiration of the chinese people, in recognition of these out-standing contributions, the government of the republic of china takes great pleasure in awarding the medal of paoting with grand cordan to admiral hopwood,

2 August 1960

In recognition and appreciation of his distinguished services, I take pleasure in accordance with the powers delegated to me by the Constitution of the Republic of Korea in awarding the

ORDER OF MILITARY MERIT TAEGUK WITH GOLD STAR

TO ADMIRAL HERBERT G. HOPWOOD 055954, UNITED STATES NAVY

As Commander in Chief, United States Pacific Fleet since February 1958 Admiral Hopwood has rendered exceptionally meritorious service to the Republic of Korea. During this period Admiral Hopwood demonstrated by his actions a sincere interest in the growth and development of the Republic of Korea Naval Forces. His assistance in improving tactical operations of Naval and Marine Forces has contributed immeasurably to their ability to effectively perform their tasks in the maintenance of freedom in the Republic of Korea. His consistent support of the training programs, including the provision of ships, training teams and marine units for combined exercises, has been a great factor toward the continuing improvement in the combat readiness of the Republic of Korea Navy.

3 August 1960

Preceded by Maurice E. Curts	Commander in Chief, United States Pacific Fleet; February 1, 1958–August 30, 1960	Succeeded by John H. Sides
