= Raymond E. Peet =

American vice admiral (1921–2021)

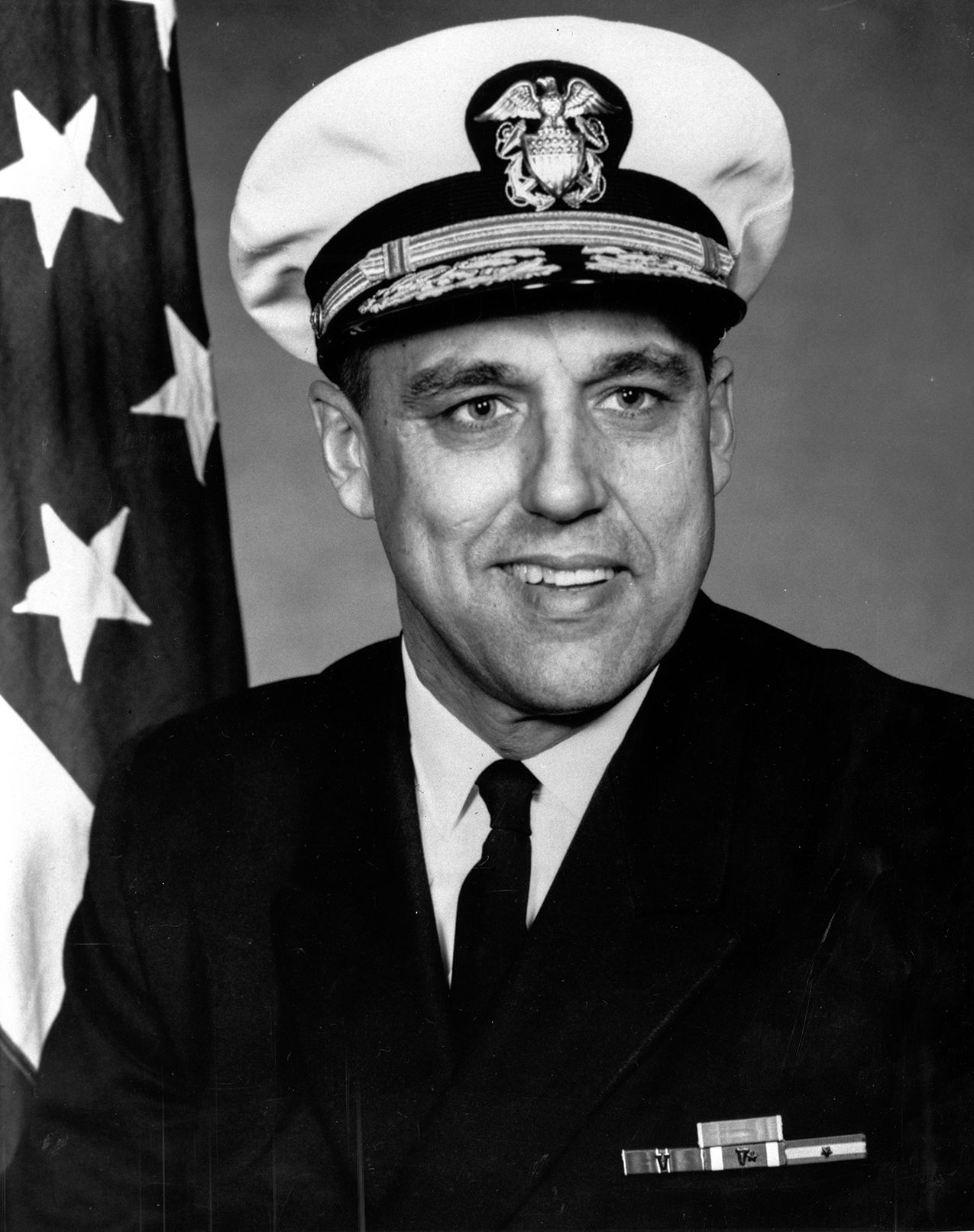
- Peet in the 1970s
- Born: January 27, 1921; Oneonta, New York, U.S.
- Died: September 10, 2021 (aged 100); La Jolla, California, U.S.
- Military career
- Allegiance: United States
- Branch: United States Navy
- Service years: 1942–1974
- Rank: Vice admiral
- Commands: United States First Fleet
- Conflicts: World War II; Korean War; Vietnam War

Raymond Edward Peet (January 27, 1921 – September 10, 2021) was an American vice admiral in the United States Navy. He was born in Oneonta, New York to U.L. and Hanna (née Thomas) Peet. He was a former commander of the United States First Fleet (from August 1, 1970 – May 15, 1972). He graduated from the United States Naval Academy in 1943. Other commands he held include Acting Assistant Secretary of Defense (International Security Affairs) and Director, Defense Security Assistance Agency. Married to Dian, he resided in La Jolla, California, and served as a consultant, manager, and on the boards of many private and public corporations. Peet died in La Jolla, California in September 2021, at the age of 100.
