= Hopwood Middle School =

Secondary school in Saipan, Northern Mariana Islands

Coordinates: 15.14036°N 145.69935°E

Hopwood Middle School, formerly Hopwood Junior High School, is a secondary school in Saipan, Northern Mariana Islands, a part of the Commonwealth of the Northern Mariana Islands Public School System.

Hopwood Junior High School (HJHS) was founded in 1949 as the Saipan Intermediate School and then renamed in 1962 after Admiral Herbert Gladstone Hopwood of the United States Navy. Admiral Hopwood served as Commander in Chief of the United States Pacific Fleet from 1958 to 1960. He was also the Commanding Officer for the Northern Mariana Islands in the 1950s.

During World War II, the location of the school was a cemetery for the Fourth Marine Division.

HJHS's school mascot is the Hilitai (Mariana monitor lizard), and its school colors are dark blue and gold.

== Promotion Ceremony ==
Every School Year, Hopwood Junior High School has a Promotion Ceremony for its eighth graders. On this day, they award the Top Ten, the Honorable Mentions, the Principal's Award (Leadership Award), the Commissioner's Award (salutatorian), and the Board of Education Award (valedictorian).

== American Scholastic Achievement League (ASAL) ==
In 2006, Sam Nepaial was the United States Territories’ Champion for the American Scholastic Achievement League.

In 2007, Andrei Seki became the United States Territories’ Champion for the American Scholastic Achievement League.

Both received a Certificate of Merit (which is given to all competitors), a Medal, and a Trophy.
