= Harry D. Felt =

US Navy admiral (1902–1992)

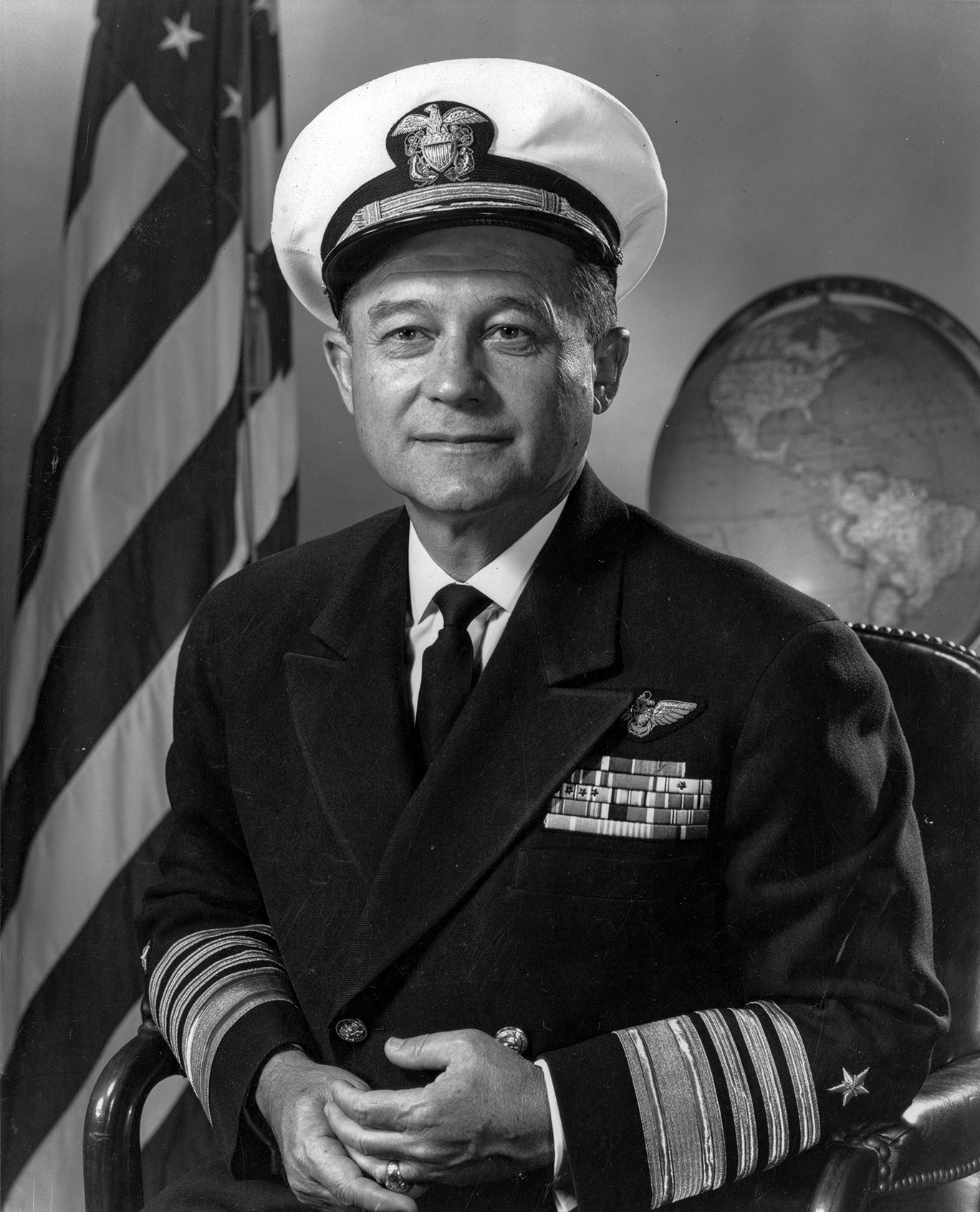
- Born: Harry Donald Felt; June 21, 1902; Topeka, Kansas, US
- Died: February 25, 1992 (aged 89); Honolulu, Hawaii, US
- Burial place: Arlington National Cemetery
- Military career
- Branch: United States Navy
- Service years: 1923–1964
- Rank: Admiral
- Nickname: Don
- Commands: Pacific Command; Sixth Fleet
- Conflicts: World War II; Vietnam War
- Awards: Navy Cross; Navy Distinguished Service Medal; Legion of Merit; Distinguished Flying Cross

Admiral Harry Donald Felt (June 21, 1902 – February 25, 1992) was a naval aviator in the United States Navy who led U.S. carrier strikes during World War II and later served as commander in chief of Pacific Command (CINCPAC) from 1958 to 1964.

== Early career ==
Born in Topeka, Kansas, to Harry Victor Felt and Grace Greenwood Johnson, Felt attended public school in Goodland, Kansas before moving with his family to Washington, D.C. at the age of ten. Lacking money for college, Felt entered a cram school to prepare for the U.S. Naval Academy and was appointed in 1919.

At the Academy, Felt earned good grades but graduated in 1923 with an unremarkable class rank of 152 out of 413, having accumulated nearly as many demerits as anyone in his class.

As a junior officer, Felt served five years aboard the battleship Mississippi and the destroyer Farenholt before applying for flight training out of sheer boredom. From then on, naval aviation became his career focus. While training at Naval Air Station Pensacola from 1928 to 1929, Felt met Kathryn Cowley, whom he married on August 3, 1929, after warning her that the Navy would always come first. She later remarked that even as a newlywed, Felt's life was "just fly, fly, fly".

== World War II ==
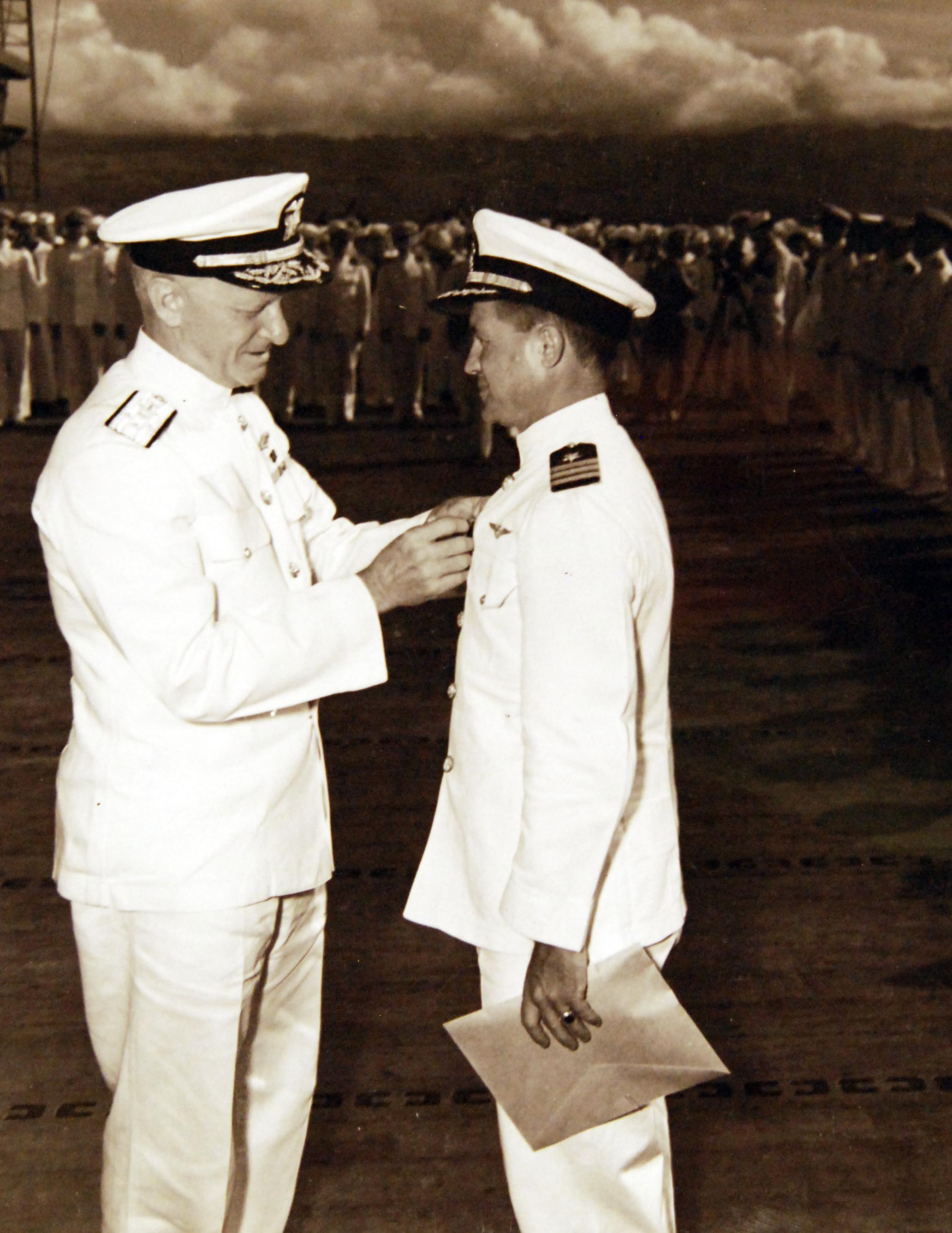
Admiral Chester W. Nimitz presents the Navy Cross to Commander Harry D. Felt (October 15, 1942).

Following the attack on Pearl Harbor, Felt was transferred to command the air group on the carrier Saratoga, with a promotion to Commander in January 1942. During the Battle of the Eastern Solomons on August 24, 1942, Felt led Air Group 3 (AG-3) from the Saratoga in an attack that sank the Japanese light carrier Ryūjō. Diving with his second wave of bombers through enemy flak and fighters, Felt personally scored the first of his group's several 1,000-pound bomb hits on the carrier.

In January 1943, Felt was assigned as the commanding officer of Naval Air Station Daytona Beach, and in February, he became the commanding officer of Naval Air Station Miami. He was promoted to captain in July of the same year. In March 1944, Felt became the first naval aviator assigned to the U.S. Military Mission to Moscow. He later commanded the escort carrier Chenango from February 1945 to January 1946, which included heavy participation in the Battle of Okinawa from March through June. Following the battle, Felt was involved in Operation Magic Carpet, ferrying servicemen home at the war's end.

== Postwar ==
After the war, Felt was assigned to the Office of the Chief of Naval Operations before attending the National War College from 1947 to 1948. He commanded the carrier Franklin D. Roosevelt in the Atlantic and Mediterranean from August 3, 1948, to July 11, 1949. He was on the staff at the Naval War College from 1949 to 1951, becoming chief of staff in the spring of 1950 and serving as acting president from October 17, 1950, to December 1, 1950. He was promoted to rear admiral in January 1951.

In March 1951, Felt was assigned to command the Middle East Force in the Persian Gulf, becoming the first flag officer to serve in that position. He later described his principal adversaries during that tour as the British, who greatly resented American intrusion into what they considered to be their exclusive sphere of influence. After returning to the Navy Department in October, Felt worked for Rear Admiral Arleigh Burke as the assistant director of the Strategic Plans Division.

Felt served as commander of Carrier Division 15 in 1953 and 1954, practicing anti-submarine warfare from the escort carrier Rendova. He commanded Carrier Division Three in the spring of 1954, operating attack carriers Essex and Philippine Sea in the South China Sea. He then served as the assistant chief of naval operations (fleet readiness) from 1954 to 1956.

== Vice Chief of Naval Operations ==
Promoted to vice admiral in 1956, Felt commanded the Sixth Fleet in the Mediterranean for six months before the new chief of naval operations, Arleigh Burke, appointed his former assistant as vice chief, a promotion that leapfrogged Felt over a score of senior admirals and carried the rank of full admiral. As vice chief of naval operations, Felt enjoyed "a reputation for eating admirals for breakfast, lunch and dinner." "The majority of naval officers in the Pentagon when told that Admiral Felt wanted to see them would practically start quivering in their boots," recalled Admiral David McDonald, future chief of naval operations. Burke joked that he kept Felt around because during the war, Burke had learned the value of a "no" man. When Burke retired in 1961, Newsweek rated Felt as a 20-1 long shot to succeed Burke as chief of naval operations.

Vice Admiral William P. Mack recalled the antics of the diminutive vice chief: "He would grab three-star officers by the lapels, literally shake them, and say, 'Why don't you do so and so or such and such?' They'd be thirty or forty pounds heavier than he was, but that didn't bother him at all. He was there for two years, which was probably about a year too long, because morale was getting pretty low. As I told Admiral Burke, it was just a matter of time before someone was going to slug him. You can't operate like that. Admiral Felt wasn't big enough to defend himself. I said that one of these days he's going to come at someone who's going to wipe up the corridor with him, regardless of how many stars he has."

By the end of Felt's second year as vice chief, even Burke had grown tired of him. "It isn't pleasant to fight continually with a good friend, and after a while you wonder whether he's all that good a friend." Furthermore, Burke suspected that Felt had become an automatic faultfinder, which if true would render his advice as useless as that of an automatic yes-man. When a four-star command opened up in the Pacific, Burke appointed Felt, claiming virtuously, "I couldn't hold him back just selfishly to keep him in the vice chief's job."

== Commander in Chief, Pacific ==
In 1958, Felt was offered the command of all U.S. forces in the Pacific and Far East, and he jumped at the opportunity to avoid spending the rest of his career behind a desk. Upon becoming commander in chief of Pacific Command on July 31, 1958, Felt immersed himself in the details of its operation, bombarding his staff with scribbled black pencil missives dubbed "Feltgrams" that invariably concluded, "Advise me ASAP. What do you think? No? Why? Resp'y, F." Although his job title was officially abbreviated as "CINCPAC," he was informally nicknamed "CINCFELT" within the command due to his larger-than-life personality. During his tenure as CINCPAC, Felt directed American military operations in three regional hotspots: Taiwan, Laos, and Vietnam.

On August 23, 1958, People's Liberation Army forces commenced shelling Republic of China forces on the islands of Quemoy and Matsu, initiating the Second Taiwan Strait Crisis. Felt immediately deployed the Seventh Fleet to help the Nationalist government defend Quemoy's supply lines. "We didn't go to war then because we were strong and moved in a deterrent force," he later concluded. During the crisis, Felt and his staff planned for the use of tactical nuclear weapons in the Taiwan Strait because they believed the use of such weapons would not trigger World War III and because "we didn't have a plan to do it any other way."

A fervent anti-communist, Felt advocated for American military intervention in Laos to suppress the Soviet-backed Pathet Lao insurrection and to interdict the flow of supplies from North Vietnam to communist insurgents in South Vietnam through the Laotian town of Tchepone. In a meeting with Defense Secretary Robert S. McNamara, Felt declared, "We have the Seventh Fleet and we have the planes to wipe Tchepone off the face of the earth." Instead, after an initial buildup of ships and marines near the Laotian borders, all American forces were withdrawn in accordance with a 1962 Geneva Conference in which all parties pledged to respect Laotian sovereignty. North Vietnam continued to supply South Vietnamese insurgents via Laos along what would become the Ho Chi Minh Trail.

=== Vietnam War ===
Felt strongly opposed deploying American soldiers into Vietnam. In internal administration debates, he warned that the proposed American intervention lacked a sound strategic concept and "would commit the U.S. to another Korea-type support and assistance situation" from which "we can't pull out at will without damaging repercussions." In a conference with General Maxwell D. Taylor, military representative to President John F. Kennedy, Felt stressed that introducing U.S. troops into Indochina would be perceived throughout Asia as the reintroduction of white colonialism into Vietnam, would provoke intensified communist aggression, and would entangle U.S. soldiers in military engagements with the Viet Cong. In early 1962, Felt presciently predicted that Viet Cong forces would seek "a prolonged form of attritional warfare" that could not "be defeated by purely military means." His favored policy was to organize, train, and equip indigenous Vietnamese forces while keeping U.S. troops out of the country.

Nevertheless, on February 8, 1962, by order of the Joint Chiefs of Staff, Felt created the U.S. Military Assistance Command Vietnam (MACV) as a sub-unified command headed by General Paul D. Harkins. As Harkins' superior in the chain of command, Felt was criticized for exercising excessive control over MACV field operations. He denied many of Harkins' equipment requests, interfered with details of Harkins' tactical planning, forbade Harkins from communicating with the Joint Chiefs of Staff without advance permission from CINCPAC, and even bypassed Harkins to direct certain tactical operations himself from his headquarters in Hawaii. Many observers argued that reporting to CINCPAC hindered MACV operations and that MACV should be an independent command under the direct supervision of the Joint Chiefs of Staff. However, Felt and his successors as CINCPAC blocked multiple attempts to remove MACV from their control, arguing that allowing MACV to bypass the unified regional commander would violate the principle of unity of command in the region.

Felt was publicly optimistic about American intervention, declaring at a 1963 press conference that the war could be won in three years. He bristled at members of the press who did not seem sufficiently enthusiastic about ongoing American military operations. Introduced to Associated Press correspondent Malcolm W. Browne at a Saigon press conference, Felt growled, "So you're Browne. Why don't you get on the team?"

On 5 June 1964 Felt was informed that Navy reconnaissance pilot Charles Klusmann had been shot down over Laos, and that Secretary of Defense Robert McNamara ordered that no rescue attempt be made. He called McNamara and repeatedly "asked" McNamara to call President Johnson to countermand this order. (Note: See Robert McNamara § Downing of Charles Klusmann over Laos for more details.)

== Legacy ==
Felt retired in July 1964 upon reaching the mandatory retirement age and spent his later years in Honolulu, Hawaii. He died on February 25, 1992, and is buried beside his wife at Arlington National Cemetery. He had one son, Donald Linn Felt, a naval aviator and jet pilot who commanded the carrier USS Midway (CV-41) before retiring at the rank of rear admiral.

He was awarded the Navy Distinguished Service Medal for his service as CINCPAC; the Navy Cross for "extraordinary heroism and distinguished service" at the Battle of the Eastern Solomons; the Distinguished Flying Cross; the Legion of Merit as commander of USS Chenango (CVE-28) during operations off Okinawa, for which the ship received a Navy Unit Commendation; the Order of the Rising Sun, First Class, from the government of Japan; and the Order of the Cloud and Banner with special Grand Cordon from the Republic of China. Cape Felt, in Antarctica, is named after him, as he served as vice chief of naval operations during the International Geophysical Year.

Felt had a fearsome reputation as an arrogant, caustic, hard-driving perfectionist. "Many people were afraid of him... he was pretty rough," commented Vice Admiral Lawson P. Ramage. A former aide described him as "mean as hell," and his staff complained that he worked "as though there were no holidays, Saturdays and Sundays, and expects others to do the same." "He was small in stature but a blunt, tough, demanding taskmaster who brought discomfiture to his peers and earned the antipathy, if not animosity, of his subordinates," judged former subordinate and future four-star admiral Ignatius J. Galantin. A crack poker player, Felt unapologetically summarized his philosophy as, "Trust everybody, but always cut the cards."

== Dates of rank ==
- Ensign - 1923
- Lieutenant, junior grade -
- Lieutenant - 1931
- Lieutenant-commander -
- Commander - January 1942
- Captain - July 1943
- Rear admiral - January 1951
- Vice admiral - April 1956
- Admiral - September 1, 1956

Military offices
Preceded by Felix B. Stump	Commander in Chief, Pacific Command; July 31, 1958–June 30, 1964	Succeeded by U. S. Grant Sharp Jr.
