= Maurice E. Curts =

American Navy admiral

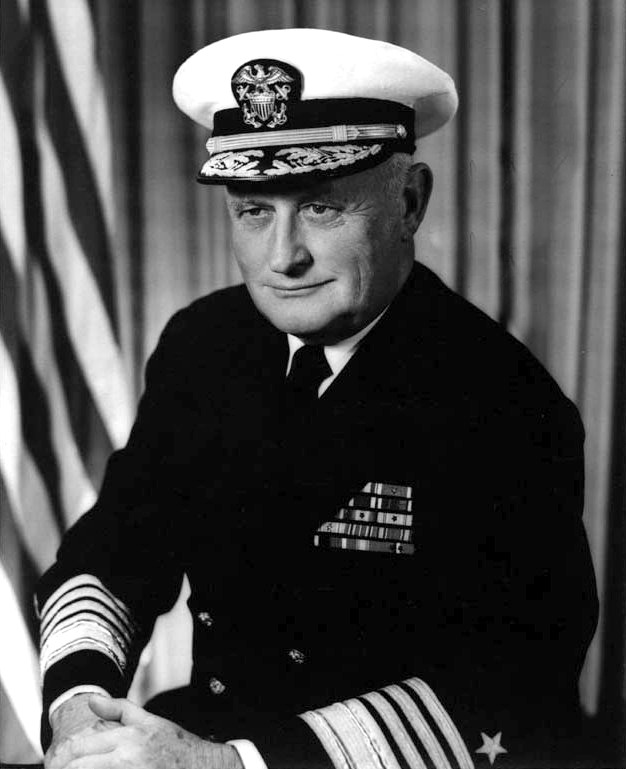
- Admiral Maurice E. Curts, c. 1958
- Born: March 25, 1898; Flint, Michigan, U.S.
- Died: February 15, 1976 (aged 77); Las Gaviotas, Mexico
- Burial place: Arlington National Cemetery
- Military career
- Allegiance: United States of America
- Branch: United States Navy
- Service years: 1919–1960
- Rank: Admiral
- Nickname: Germany
- Commands: USS Columbia (CL-56); United States Pacific Fleet
- Conflicts: World War I World War II: Attack on Pearl Harbor
- Awards: Navy Cross; Navy Distinguished Service Medal (2); Silver Star; Legion of Merit (3); Bronze Star; Purple Heart

Maurice Edwin Curts (March 25, 1898 – February 15, 1976) was a four-star admiral in the United States Navy who served as commander in chief of the United States Pacific Fleet in 1958.

== Early career ==
He was born in Flint, Michigan to Edwin James Curts, who represented the 13th District in the Michigan state senate from 1913 to 1914, and the former Minnie Elwood Quirk. Appointed to the United States Naval Academy, he served afloat as a midshipman with the Atlantic Fleet during World War I aboard the battleship Nevada in the summer of 1918. He graduated in June 1919 with the accelerated class of 1920.

His first assignment was aboard the light cruiser Chester, followed by sea duty in destroyers of the Atlantic Fleet and the aircraft carrier Saratoga, and shore duty at Naval Operating Base, Hampton Roads, Virginia and the Bureau of Engineering, Navy Department.

Between 1926 and 1928 he studied the emerging technology of radio at the Naval Postgraduate School and Harvard University, developing expertise which eventually led to his assignment from June 1936 to May 1938 as Officer-in-Charge of the Radio and Sound Divisions at the Naval Research Laboratory, where his contributions to the development of radar earned him a commendation from the Secretary of the Navy.

From 1938 to 1939 he commanded the destroyer Case, which was serving as a school ship in San Diego, California.

== World War II ==
In June 1939, Curts was tapped to serve as communications officer on the staff of the new Commander Battle Force, Admiral James O. Richardson. When Richardson became Commander in Chief, United States Fleet, Curts accompanied him as fleet communications officer. During Fleet Problem XXI in 1940, the fleet tested its communications procedures under simulated war conditions and discovered serious deficiencies in its existing communications plans. After the exercise, the fleet continued to communicate under simulated war conditions at Curts's recommendation. Richardson declared later: "If the Fleet Problem had resulted in no other advance in naval war readiness and in training, this major step alone would have justified all the money and effort put into the Fleet Problem."

After Richardson was unexpectedly removed from command in January 1941, Curts hoped to leave the fleet staff and return to sea. When Richardson's replacement, Admiral Husband E. Kimmel, summoned Curts to the flagship and asked, "Young man, would you like to be on my staff?" Curts firmly answered, "Hell, no!" Taken aback, Kimmel retorted, "You've got to. There's no getting out of it." In reply, Curts muttered, "Oh, hell!" in tones of such disgusted resignation that everyone present, including Kimmel, burst out laughing.

=== Attack on Pearl Harbor ===
At the beginning of the Japanese attack on Pearl Harbor on December 7, 1941, Curts rushed to Pacific Fleet headquarters, where he was standing beside Kimmel when a spent .50 caliber machine gun bullet crashed through a glass window and bounced harmlessly off Kimmel's chest, leaving a dark stain on the admiral's white uniform. Kimmel picked the bullet up off the floor and murmured, more to himself than to Curts, "It would have been merciful had it killed me." This incident was depicted in the 1970 film Tora! Tora! Tora!; Martin Balsam portrayed Admiral Kimmel, while G.D. Spradlin portrayed Curts.

After the attack, Curts discovered that civilian hysteria in Honolulu was being stoked by the local radio stations, which were broadcasting a series of well-intended messages that were designed to instruct and calm the population but were having the opposite effect. Curts telephoned the stations to "knock off the damned foolishness."

=== Fleet communications officer ===
Following Kimmel's relief, Curts continued as communications officer on the staff of Kimmel's successor, Admiral Chester W. Nimitz, relaying messages to Nimitz from the field during the Battles of the Coral Sea and Midway. Curts was awarded the Bronze Star for organizing and establishing a more workable system of joint Army and Navy communications while communications officer for the Pacific Fleet.

In August 1942, Curts was summoned to Washington D.C. to join the staff of Admiral Ernest J. King, commander in chief of the United States Fleet. As communications officer for the United States Fleet, Curts received the Legion of Merit for his part in adopting successful communication agreements and plans between the military services of the United States and its Allies. Curts is credited with developing the numbering system for organizing fleets and task forces that is still used today.

=== USS Columbia ===
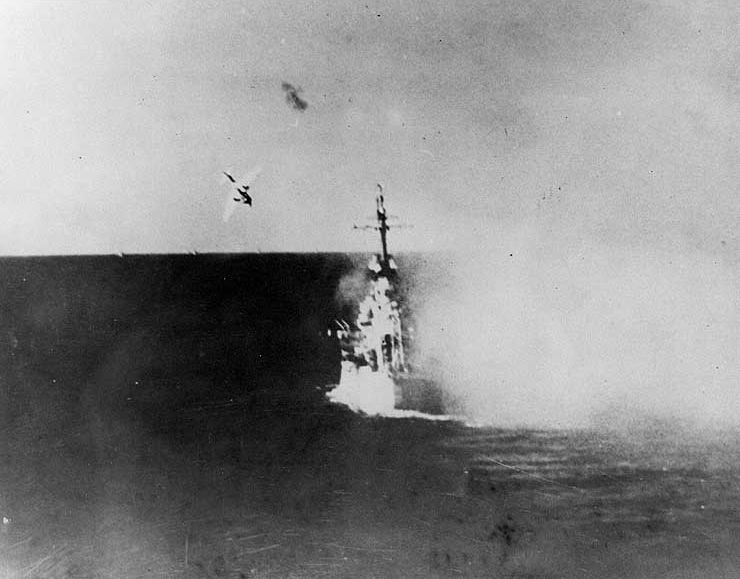
USS Columbia (CL-56) being attacked by a kamikaze off Lingayen Gulf, January 6, 1945

He returned to the Pacific theater in 1944 as captain of the light cruiser Columbia, which participated in major Pacific operations including the Battle for Leyte Gulf and the Surigao Strait and Lingayen Gulf landings in the Philippines.

He was awarded the Navy Cross for commanding Columbia during the amphibious landings on Leyte and during the Battle for Leyte Gulf from October 17, 1944 to October 29, 1944. The citation stated: "Skillfully directing his ship in an assignment of vital importance, [then-Captain] Curts courageously maneuvered through enemy-infested waters during the approach on Leyte Gulf and, continually providing alert and effective defense for our invasion forces against hostile air attacks, furnished close-in bombardment support for the actual landings. In the course of this action, his ship assisted in the sinking of at least one Japanese battleship, a cruiser and six destroyers, thereby contributing materially to the success of our operations in this area."

On January 6, 1945, while supporting the landings at Lingayen Gulf, Columbia was struck by two kamikaze planes, suffering heavy damage and casualties. Swift damage control measures allowed Columbia to complete its bombardment and remain in action to support underwater demolition teams. Three days later, Columbia lay close inshore, with maneuverability hampered by the surrounding landing craft, when struck by a third kamikaze. Again, Columbia extinguished fires and repaired damage, and was able to complete its bombardment schedule within half an hour of being hit, before departing that night in escort of a group of unloaded transports.

Later that year, as chief of staff and aide to the new Commander, Fast Carrier Task Force, Pacific Fleet, Vice Admiral Frederick C. Sherman, Curts attended the Japanese surrender ceremony aboard the battleship Missouri on September 2, 1945.

== Flag officer ==
After the war, he was commander of Cruiser Division Twenty in 1946; chief of Navy General Plans from 1947 to 1948; Force Commander, Operational Development Force, Atlantic Fleet from 1949 to 1950; and assistant chief of naval operations (readiness) from 1951 to 1953.

From 1953 to 1955 he went to sea as Commander Cruisers-Destroyers, Pacific, where his career was stalled temporarily by Secretary of the Navy Charles S. Thomas. Chief of Naval Operations Robert B. Carney was selecting members of an upcoming promotion board and picked Curts for his skill and contacts in the fields of electronics and communications. However, "Mr. Thomas vetoed [Curts] when I brought the slate in, and said that he didn't want him around Washington. I couldn't get from him any expression of reason as to this prejudice, but it was perfectly obvious that I couldn't bring [Curts] back. It was also perfectly obvious that I'd better not nominate him for three stars, which I had planned to do...But about a year later, I was looking for a replacement in the Second Fleet, and I brought in a nomination. Thomas said that he wasn't particularly impressed with the person I was suggesting and said it seemed to him that I'd do better if I put someone like [Curts] in." Queried as to his change of heart, Thomas initially denied ever having vetoed Curts, then, when pressed by an incredulous Carney, "finally said he couldn't understand why he had done it, except that somebody must have told him something." Carney immediately nominated Curts for his third star.

Curts returned to Pearl Harbor in 1955 as deputy commander in chief of the Pacific Fleet with the rank of vice admiral. He was promoted to admiral on April 29, 1957 upon assuming command of that fleet, though he continued to be titled deputy commander in chief since the title of Commander in Chief, Pacific Fleet (CINCPACFLT) remained dual-hatted with the title of Commander in Chief, Pacific (CINCPAC), and both were held by Admiral Felix B. Stump. The titles were finally separated on January 14, 1958, and Curts became CINCPACFLT in his own right for the two weeks remaining before his relief on February 1 by Admiral Herbert G. Hopwood.

Upon relinquishing command of the Pacific Fleet, Curts reverted to the rank of vice admiral for his final assignment as Commander, Western Sea Frontier and Commander, Naval Defense Force, Eastern Pacific. He retired on April 1, 1960 as a full admiral and became director for telecommunications policy in the Office of the Secretary of Defense until retiring for a second time in 1965.

== Personal life ==
He married Nina (née Irvine) on August 16, 1919; she died in 1965 and he remarried to Fayette Hobbs (née Purcell) in January 1967. He had two sons: Navy officer Robert Irvine Curts and Daniel Curts.

== Awards and decorations ==
His decorations include two Distinguished Service Medals, including one for his service as communications officer for the United States Fleet; the Navy Cross, awarded for distinguished service while commanding Columbia at the Battle for Leyte Gulf; the Silver Star; the Bronze Star; three awards of the Legion of Merit; the Purple Heart; and decorations from Thailand, Peru, and Argentina. He received a commendation from the Secretary of the Navy for outstanding contributions in the development of radar while serving as officer-in-charge of the Radio and Sound division of the Naval Research Laboratory.

- Navy Cross
- Navy Distinguished Service Medal with one Gold Star
- Silver Star
- Legion of Merit with two Gold Stars
- Bronze Star
- Purple Heart

He received a master's degree in electrical engineering from Harvard University in 1928.

== Namesake ==
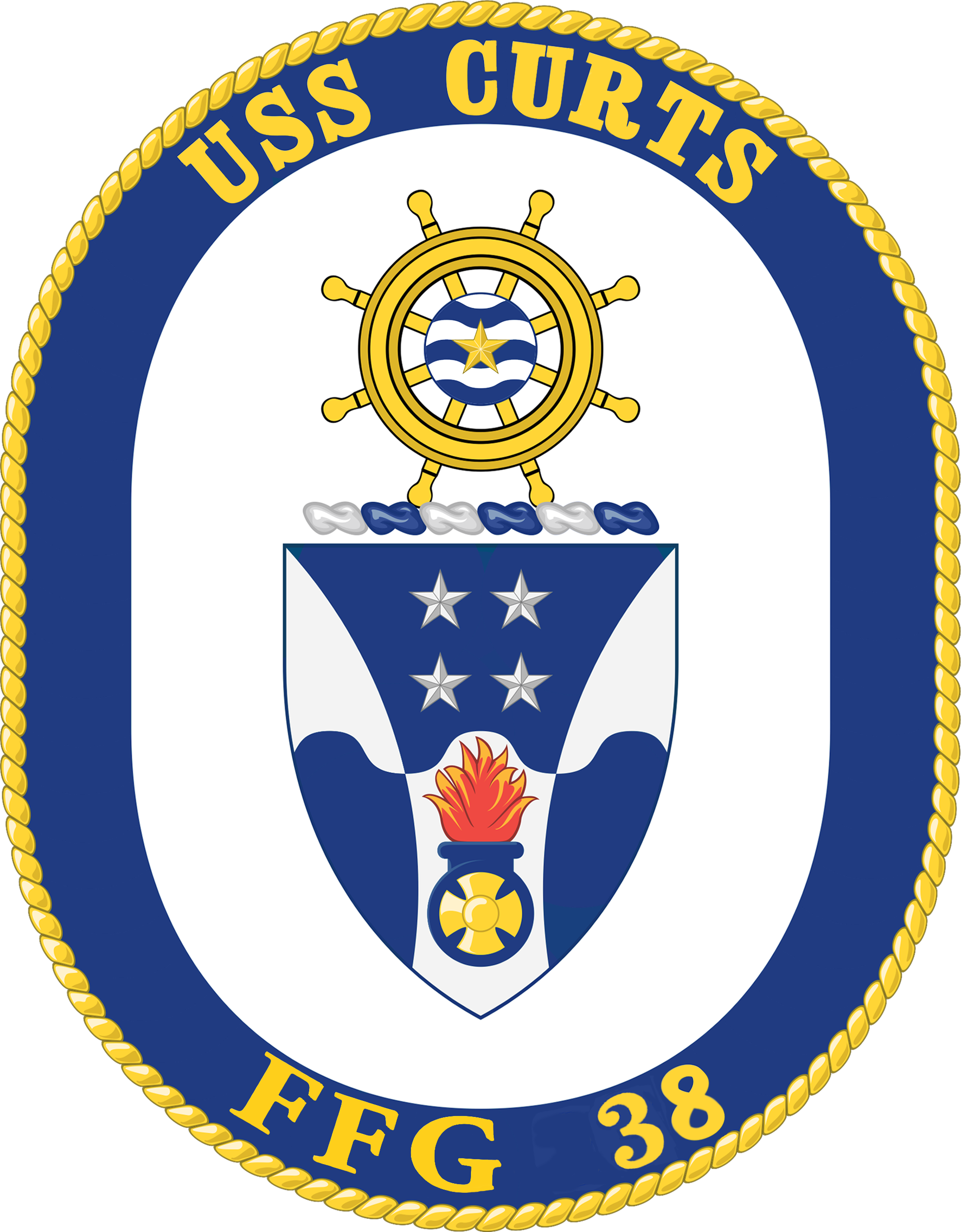

He is the namesake of the guided-missile frigate Curts, whose crest contains a flaming bomb referring to his combat service in command of Columbia, flanked by sinusoidal waves intended to evoke his contributions to the development of radar.

== Retirement, death and burial ==
In retirement, he resided in Washington D.C. for many years, then moved to Rancho Santa Fe, California. He died at his vacation home at Las Gaviotas, Baja California, Mexico at the age of 77, and is buried with his first wife in Arlington National Cemetery.

Military offices
Preceded by Felix B. Stump	Commander in Chief, United States Pacific Fleet; January 14, 1958 – February 1, 1958	Succeeded by Herbert G. Hopwood
