= USS Curts =

1982 Oliver Hazard Perry-class frigate

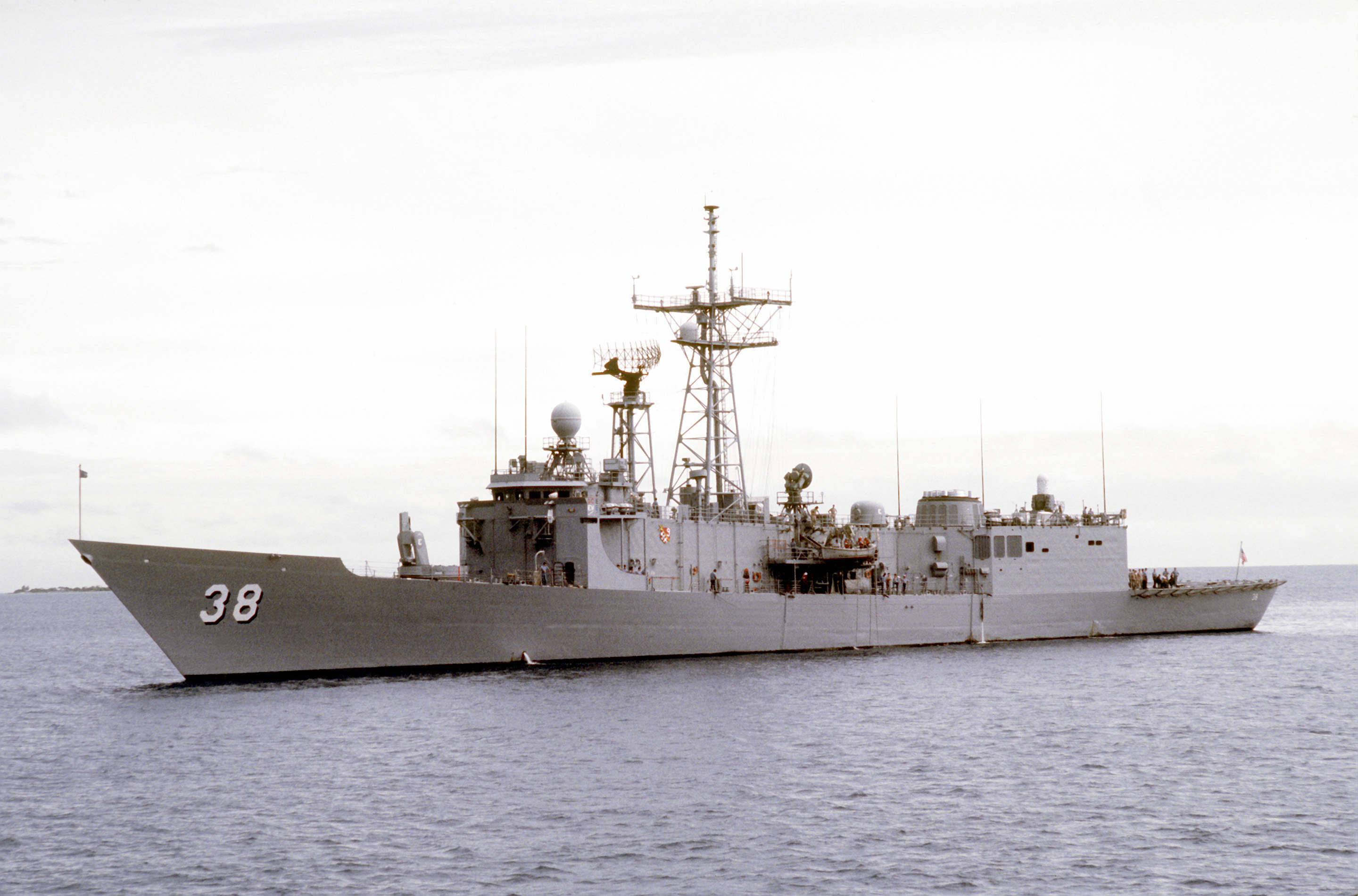
- USS Curts (FFG-38)

History

United States
- Name: Curts
- Namesake: Admiral Maurice Curts
- Awarded: 27 April 1979
- Builder: Todd Pacific Shipyards, Los Angeles Division, San Pedro, California
- Laid down: 1 July 1981
- Launched: 6 March 1982
- Acquired: 2 September 1983
- Commissioned: 8 October 1983
- Decommissioned: 25 January 2013
- Identification: Hull symbol:FFG-38; Code letters:NHOC
- Nickname(s): ".38 Special"
- Fate: Sunk as a target, 19 September 2020
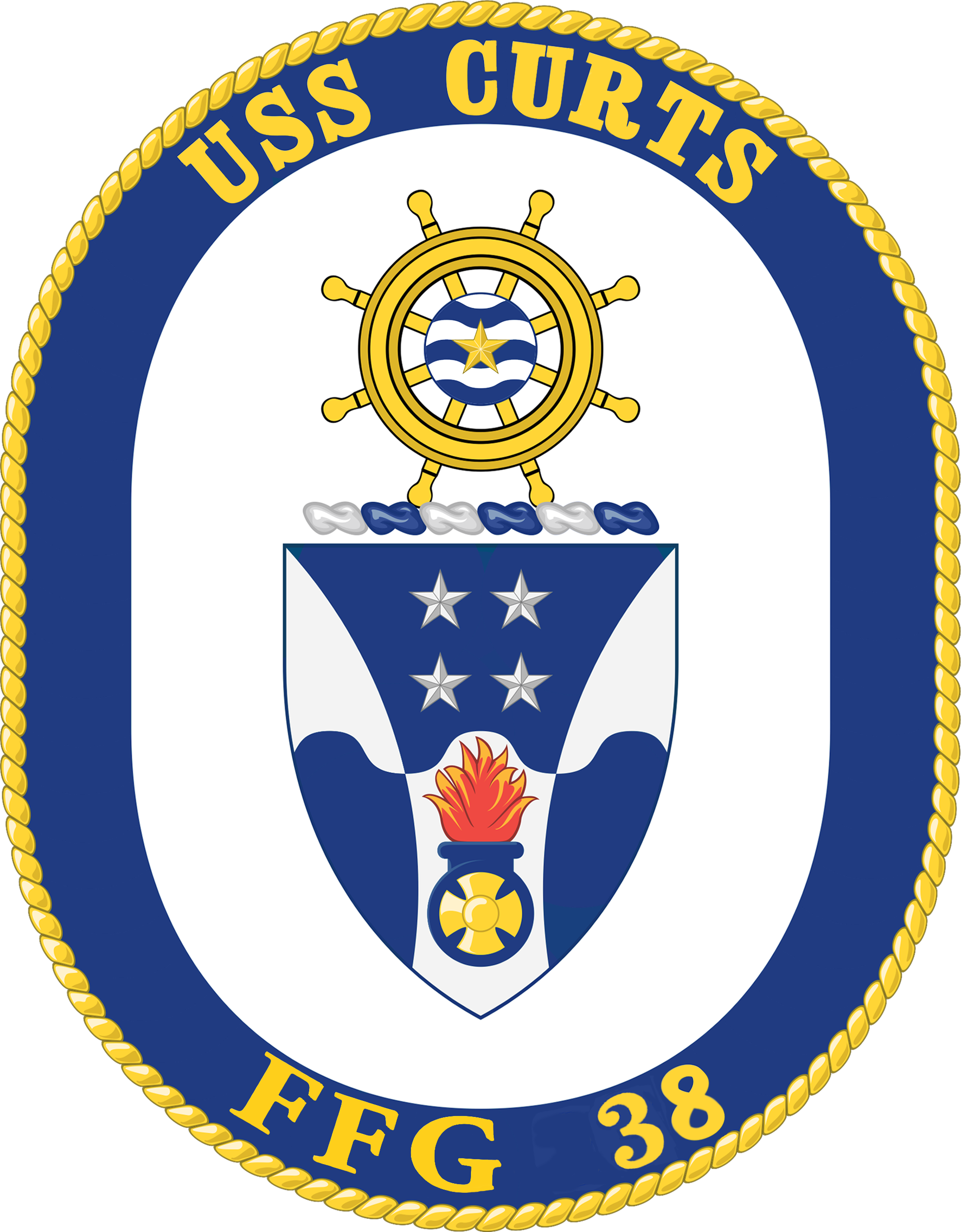
- Badge

General characteristics
- Class & type: Oliver Hazard Perry-class frigate
- Displacement: 4,100 long tons (4,200 t), full load
- Length: 453 feet (138 m), overall
- Beam: 45 feet (14 m)
- Draft: 22 feet (6.7 m)
- Propulsion: 2 × General Electric LM2500-30 gas turbines generating 41,000 shp (31 MW) through a single shaft and variable pitch propeller; 2 × Auxiliary Propulsion Units, 350 hp (260 kW) retractable electric azimuth thrusters for maneuvering and docking.
- Speed: over 29 knots (54 km/h)
- Range: 5,000 nautical miles at 18 knots (9,300 km at 33 km/h)
- Complement: 15 officers and 190 enlisted, plus SH-60 LAMPS detachment of roughly six officer pilots and 15 enlisted maintainers
- Sensors & processing systems: AN/SPS-49 air-search radar; AN/SPS-55 surface-search radar; CAS and STIR fire-control radar; AN/SQS-56 sonar.
- Electronic warfare & decoys: AN/SLQ-32
- Armament: As built: 1 × OTO Melara Mk 75 76 mm/62 caliber naval gun; 2 × Mk 32 triple-tube (324 mm) launchers for Mark 46 torpedoes; 1 × Vulcan Phalanx CIWS; 4 × .50-cal (12.7 mm) machine guns.; 1 × Mk 13 Mod 4 single-arm launcher for Harpoon anti-ship missiles and SM-1MR Standard anti-ship/air missiles (40 round magazine); Note: As of 2004, Mk 13 systems removed from all active US vessels of this class.
- Aircraft carried: 2 × SH-60 LAMPS III helicopters
- Aviation facilities: 2 × hangars; RAST helicopter hauldown system

USS Curts (FFG-38) was the twenty-ninth ship of the Oliver Hazard Perry-class of guided-missile frigates. She was named for Admiral Maurice Curts (1898–1976). Curts is the first ship of that name in the US Navy.

Ordered from Todd Pacific Shipyards, Los Angeles Division, San Pedro, California on 27 April 1979 as part of the FY79 program, Curts was laid down on 1 July 1981, launched on 6 March 1982, and commissioned on 8 October 1983. She was decommissioned on 25 January 2013.

== Service history ==
=== 1980s ===
Curts's early years in commission were focused on anti-submarine warfare (ASW) operations and Curts was the first Pacific Fleet unit with the complete SQQ-89 ASW suite. The ship received the meritorious unit commendation for tactical proficiency in the tracking of Soviet submarines in 1987.

In 1988, Curts received the armed forces expeditionary medal for serving with the USS Missouri battle group during Operation Earnest Will in the north Arabian Sea and the Gulf of Oman. Additionally, Curts changed homeport to Yokosuka, Japan, becoming one of the first two guided-missile frigates to join the Forward Deployed Naval Force (FDNF). Curts was first to bring SH-60B LAMPS MK III helicopters to Naval Air Facility Atsugi.

=== Operation Desert Storm ===
On 24 January 1991, during Operation Desert Storm, the ship and her embarked navy and army helicopters captured an Iraqi garrison on Qaruh Island in the northern Persian Gulf, taking the island and custody of 51 Iraqi prisoners. Curts destroyed two mines, sank an Iraqi minelayer and provided support to combat helicopter operations during the battle of Bubiyan Island. The ship received the navy unit commendation for her exceptional operational performance.

=== 1990s ===
Upon return from combat operations in June 1991, the ship became an important part of Operation Fiery Vigil rescuing numerous refugees to safety when Mount Pinatubo erupted near Subic Bay, Republic of The Philippines.

In 1993, Curts was upgraded with the 4100-ton class modification, extending her stern another 8 feet (2.4 m) and enhancing her combat capabilities. [The information about extending her stern by 8 feet was probably sourced from the DANFS history, which is not always 100% accurate. Curts was built as a long-hull FFG-7, which were 8 feet longer than the short hull versions, so this is unlikely]. Curts joined the Independence Battle Group in 1993 to participate with the Japanese Maritime Self-Defense Force in joint anti-submarine warfare exercise MAREX. Later that year, the ship deployed to the Persian Gulf conducting 89 boardings of merchant vessels in the Red Sea as part of United Nations sanctions enforcement against Iraq. Curts material and operational readiness was rewarded with the battle efficiency award for 1994.

In 1994, Curts participated in the RIMPAC 94 exercise and sailed from its homeport in Yokosuka, Japan to Honolulu, Hawaii to participate with International Navies from around the Pacific, including Japan, Korea, Canada and more.

In 1995, Curts participated in major joint exercises with units of the U.S. Navy and Japanese Maritime Self-Defense Force (JMSDF), and later with the navies of Singapore, Malaysia, and Thailand for 1996 cooperation afloat for readiness and training (CARAT 96).

In 1997, after nine years of forward presence as part of the seventh fleet, Curts departed Yokosuka, Japan for a homeport change to San Diego, California and in October 1998 Curts joined the Naval Reserve Force (NRF).

In 1998, Curts deployed to the multi-lateral exercise Teamwork South, where she participated in exercises with navies from the United Kingdom, Colombia, Ecuador, Peru and Chile. Upon completion of Teamwork South, Curts steamed to Hawaii to participate in multi-lateral exercise RIMPAC 98. Curts made national headlines when a Salinas, Ecuador hotel security guard died from injuries he received during a scuffle with a LTJG (pilot) and Senior Chief Petty Officer assigned to helicopter squadron HSL-43 embarked on Curts for the deployment. Both men were removed from the ship and returned to the U.S. to face a court martial.

In 1999, Curts deployed to counter-narco-terrorism deployment under the direction of Joint Inter-agency Task Force East (now named Joint Interagency Task Force South). In addition to seizing approximately 5 metric tons of cocaine, Curts conducted rare bi-lateral counter-narcotics exercises with the Colombian Navy. After departing a short visit to Aruba Curts responded to a distress call from M/V Olga, north of the Guajira Peninsula. Curts crew were awarded the Humanitarian Service Medal for joint rescue efforts that saved the lives of several Olga crew members. The half-way point of this deployment found Curts celebrating Halloween in Key West, Christmas in St. Thomas and New Years again in Key West, Florida. The timing of this deployment also caused Curts to be the last U.S. warship to transit the Panama Canal under U.S. control in 1999 (ex-USS New Jersey was towed through just before Curts transit) and the first to transit it under Panamanian control in 2000.

=== 2000s ===
During CARAT cruises in 2001 and 2003, Curts conducted multilateral exercises with the navies of Singapore, Thailand, Brunei, and the Philippines to continue promoting international training and cooperation.

In 2004 Curts again deployed to southern command on a six-month counter-narcotics deployment with Coast Guard Law Enforcement Detachment (LEDET) 105 and received national notoriety for the largest maritime seizure of cocaine (12 tons) in history. The ship received the U.S. Coast Guard Meritorious Unit Commendation for her outstanding performance during deployment.

Curts deployed again in 2006 to counter-narco-terrorism deployment. Although less successful than the 2004 deployment, Curts interdicted three cocaine shipments, totalling in excess of 10 metric tons of cocaine and apprehension and transport of over 50 smugglers.

On 16 February 2007, Curts was awarded the 2006 Battle "E" award.

In 2007 Curts was transferred from Commander Destroyer Squadron One to Commander Destroyer Squadron Nine and incorporated into Carrier Strike Group Nine. In March USS Abraham Lincoln Strike Group (CSG-9) departed for deployment to the 5th Fleet area of operations (Persian Gulf). This marked Curts first Strike Group deployment since transfer to the U.S. Naval Reserve. Curts primarily performed a Critical Infrastructure Protection role by acting as Scene of Action Commander for Oil Platform protection efforts at the Khawar al Amaya and al Basrah oil terminals in the northern Persian Gulf. Curts also conducted bi-lateral exercises with the Malaysian and Pakistani navies during her transit to the Gulf.

Curts was commanded by Yvette M. Davids from April 2007 to November 2008, making Davids the first Hispanic American woman to command a navy ship.

Curts was decommissioned on 25 January 2013, and was transferred to the inactive reserves on 27 February.

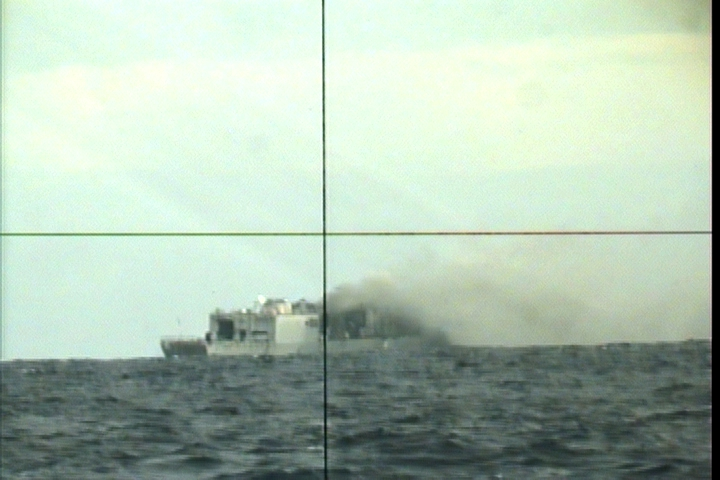
Curts being sunk, in September 2020.

In December 2012 during the 112th Session of Congress, a transfer-by-grant was proposed. The recipient would be The Navy of Mexico, who may receive Curts, along with McClusky. Both vessels were not transferred. The act of approving the transfer of vessels by the United States does not guarantee that the vessels will actually be transferred. As of September 2016, both ships were in reserve at Pearl Harbor and slated to be disposed of as targets.

On 19 September 2020, Curts was sunk during a sinking exercise (SINKEX) in the Pacific Ocean. The SINKEX was part of Exercise Valiant Shield 2020. She was targeted with live ordnance including air-launched ordnance from fixed and rotary wing of Carrier Air Wing Five, embarked aboard the aircraft carrier USS Ronald Reagan (CVN-76), RGM-84 Harpoon missiles from the cruisers USS Antietam (CG-54) and USS Shiloh (CG-67), a subsurface launched missile from the submarine USS Chicago (SSN-721), as well as various supporting U.S. Navy and United States Air Force aircraft.
