= Harold M. Martin =

United States Navy Vice admiral

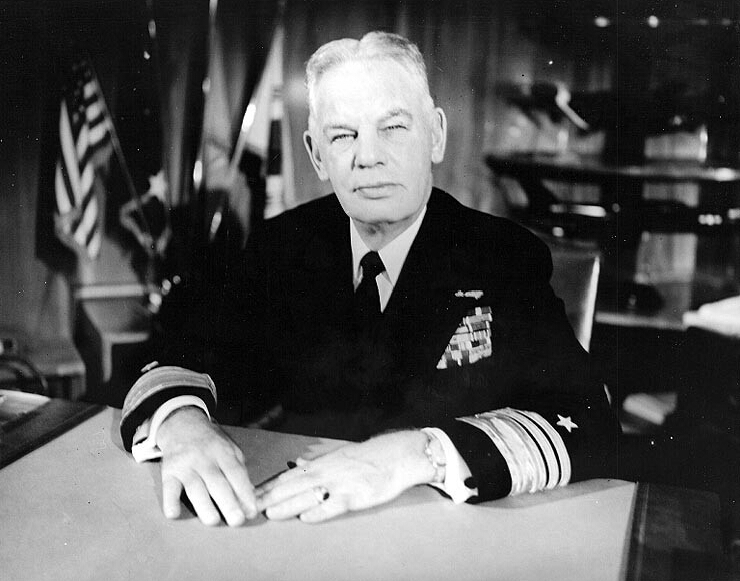
- Vice Admiral Harold M. Martin as Commander Air Force, U.S. Pacific Fleet, c. 1953-56
- Born: Harold Montgomery Martin; January 28, 1896; Bay Mills, Michigan, U.S.
- Died: December 3, 1972 (aged 76); Memphis, Tennessee, U.S.
- Military career
- Allegiance: United States
- Branch: U.S. Navy
- Service years: 1921–1956
- Rank: Vice Admiral
- Conflicts: World War I World War II; Korean War
- Awards: Distinguished Service Medal; Silver Star; Legion of Merit (2)

Harold Montgomery Martin (January 28, 1896 – December 3, 1972) was an American naval aviator, commanding officer at Marine Corps Base Hawaii, and vice admiral in the United States Navy. After reaching the rank of vice admiral in 1951, Martin served as commander of United States First Fleet, United States Seventh Fleet, and later commander of the U.S. Pacific Fleet until he retired in February 1956 as admiral in the U.S. Navy.

== Education ==
Martin was born on January 18, 1896, in Bay Mills, Michigan. Raised in Cairo, Illinois, he attended the University of Illinois. Martin was then appointed to the United States Naval Academy in 1915 and graduated in 1918. During his final year at the Naval Academy, he was captain of the Lacrosse team.

== Career ==
Martin served in USS Winslow (DD-53) during the World War I. After the WWI ended, he served in USS Nevada (BB-36). In 1921, he received flight training and was appointed as the naval aviator. Martin commanded several squadron military aircraft units, including Squadrons VS-2B and VP-10F from 1933 to 1936. Before commanding Scouting Fleet, he served as commander at Naval Air Station at Kāneʻohe Bay, Hawaii from 1941 to 1942 and subsequently at Naval Air Facility Midway Island. Later, he commanded an Independence-class aircraft carrier USS San Jacinto (CVL-30), including combat operations process in modern-day Pacific Ocean Areas from 1943 to 1944. He was awarded the Silver Star for his actions in response to a 13 October 1944 Japanese torpedo bomber attack on USS San Jacinto. Before reaching to the rank of vice admiral, Martin was assigned to Carrier Division near Okinawa Island on 23 March 1945. He served as commander of the U.S. navy Task Force 49, a military unit which was established primarily to support soviet operations. After the World War II ended, he served at various fleet/carrier air wings and carrier strike group, and later chief of naval for Air Technical Training branch.

In 1951, Martin was promoted to the three-star rank of vice admiral and served as commander of United States Pacific Fleet, including First as well as Seventh Fleet during the Korean War which he was assigned in 1952. He was awarded the Distinguished Service Medal for his actions as commander of the Seventh Fleet between March 1951 and February 1952. In February 1956, he retired from the U.S. naval service as a four-star admiral. Martin died on 3 December 1972 at Memphis, Tennessee, U.S.
