= USS McClusky =

Oliver Hazard Perry-class frigate of the United States Navy

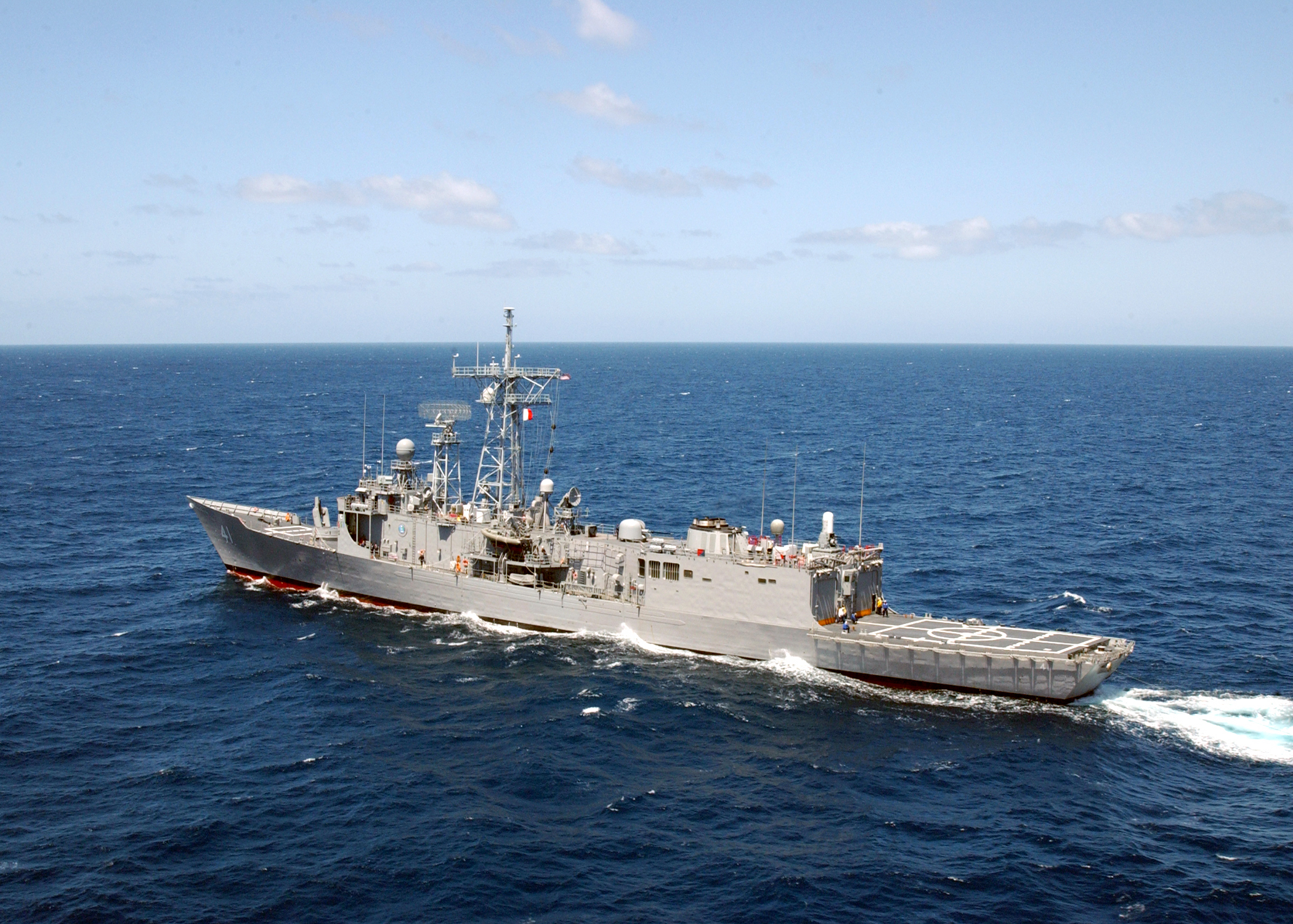
- USS McClusky (FFG-41)

History

United States
- Name: McClusky
- Namesake: Rear Admiral C. Wade McClusky
- Awarded: 27 April 1979
- Builder: Todd Pacific Shipyards, Los Angeles Division, San Pedro, California
- Laid down: 21 October 1981
- Launched: 18 September 1982
- Sponsored by: Mrs. Ruth Mundy McClusky
- Christened: 18 September 1982
- Commissioned: 10 December 1983
- Decommissioned: 14 January 2015
- Maiden voyage: 15 January 1986
- Identification: Hull symbol:FFG-41; Code letters:NMDK
- Motto: Persistent, Courageous, Victorious
- Nickname(s): Mighty Mac
- Fate: Sunk as a target during RIMPAC 2018 July 19, 2018
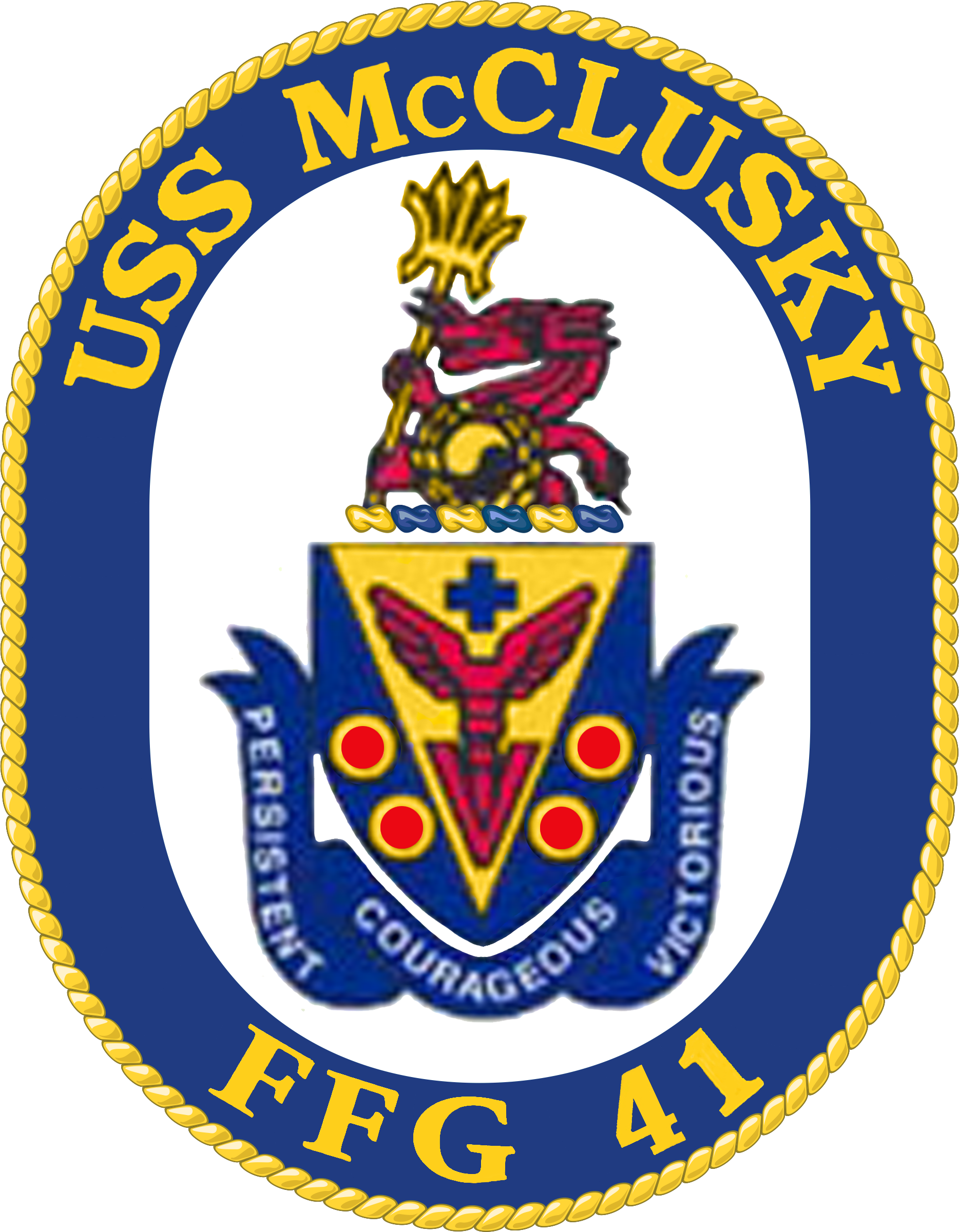
- Badge

General characteristics
- Class & type: Oliver Hazard Perry-class frigate
- Displacement: 4,100 long tons (4,200 t), full load
- Length: 453 feet (138 m), overall
- Beam: 45 feet (14 m)
- Draught: 22 feet (6.7 m)
- Propulsion: 2 × General Electric LM2500-30 gas turbines generating 41,000 shp (31 MW) through a single shaft and variable pitch propeller; 2 × Auxiliary Propulsion Units, 350 hp (260 kW) retractable electric azimuth thrusters for maneuvering and docking.
- Speed: over 29 knots (54 km/h)
- Range: 5,000 nautical miles at 18 knots (9,300 km at 33 km/h)
- Complement: 15 officers and 190 enlisted, plus SH-60 LAMPS detachment of roughly six officer pilots and 15 enlisted maintainers
- Sensors & processing systems: AN/SPS-49 air-search radar; AN/SPS-55 surface-search radar; CAS and STIR fire-control radar; AN/SQS-56 sonar.
- Electronic warfare & decoys: AN/SLQ-32
- Armament: As built: 1 × OTO Melara Mk 75 76 mm/62 caliber naval gun; 2 × Mk 32 triple-tube (324 mm) launchers for Mark 46 torpedoes; 1 × Vulcan Phalanx CIWS; 4 × .50-cal (12.7 mm) machine guns.; 1 × Mk 13 Mod 4 single-arm launcher for Harpoon anti-ship missiles and SM-1MR Standard anti-ship/air missiles (40 round magazine); Note: As of 2004, Mk 13 systems removed from all active US vessels of this class.
- Aircraft carried: 2 × SH-60 LAMPS III helicopters
- Aviation facilities: 2 × hangars; RAST helicopter hauldown system

USS McClusky (FFG-41) was an Oliver Hazard Perry-class frigate of the United States Navy. She was named for Rear Admiral C. Wade McClusky (1902–1976) who as a lieutenant commander led the air group of USS Enterprise (CV-6), which sank the Japanese carriers Kaga and Akagi during the Battle of Midway. McClusky later served as part of Destroyer Squadron 1, and after 31 years of service, was decommissioned on 14 January 2015.

== Construction ==
McClusky was laid down on 21 October 1981 by the Todd Pacific Shipyards, Los Angeles Division, San Pedro, California; launched on 18 September 1982; sponsored by Mrs. Ruth Mundy McClusky; and commissioned on 10 December 1983 in Long Beach, California.

== Service ==
In 1986 McClusky was part of Destroyer Squadron 23 under Captain Todd Barthold. McClusky embarked on her first deployment on 15 January 1986. She was a part of Battle Group Foxtrot, headed by the aircraft carrier USS Enterprise (CVN-65), and included the cruisers Truxtun and Arkansas, the destroyers O'Brien and David R. Ray and the frigates Reasoner and Lewis B. Puller. The battle group sailed directly for the Indian Ocean, with stops in Hawaii, Naval Station Subic Bay, and Singapore.

In 1988 McClusky began the year as part of Joint Task Force Middle East carrying out Operation Earnest Will missions. She participated in Exercise RIMPAC that year as part of the Orange Force.

In 1990 McClusky was part of Destroyer Squadron 13. She began the year at Mina Sulman, Bahrain, on a Middle East Force deployment. On 3 January, she was underway for a Northern Persian Gulf patrol, which included a refueling stop at anchorage in Kuwait on 10 January. Upon returning to Mina Sulman on 13 January for the final time, the mast-mounted sight was removed. After a short patrol of Northern Persian Gulf, McClusky headed south towards the Straits of Hormuz, completing a successful three-month assignment to the Middle East Force. On 30 January, McClusky anchored alongside the frigate Rodney M. Davis in Fujayrah for a Middle East Force turnover before meeting up with the frigate Gary and transiting to the Western Pacific.

From 31 August to 4 September 1990, McClusky had the privilege of hosting the Soviet oiler Argun, visiting San Diego with two Soviet combatants. The arrival of the destroyers Admiral Vinogradov, Boyevoy, and Argun at San Diego on 31 July 1990 was followed by a ceremony with Admiral Charles R. Larson (Commander-in-Chief, Pacific Fleet) Mayor Maureen O'Connor, and Admiral Gennady Khvatov, the Commander of the Soviet Pacific Fleet, as speakers.

In 1991 McClusky shifted homeports to Yokosuka, Japan and joined Destroyer Squadron 15. She assisted in Operation Fiery Vigil, the evacuation of civilians from the Philippines during the eruption of Mount Pinatubo.

== Fate ==
McClusky was to be sold to the Mexican Navy under the Foreign Military Sales program as of 2014. However, as of September 2016, the ship was in reserve at Pearl Harbor and was slated to be disposed of as a target. In January 2018 it was announced that McClusky would be used as a target during RIMPAC 2018. On 19 July 2018 she was sunk in waters 55 nautical miles (102 km; 63 mi) north of Kauai, Hawaii.

== Important events ==
- 1986 – Involved in the patrolling of Taiwan international waters during large-scale Chinese People's Liberation Army Navy exercises in the region.
- 1986 – January–July first Pacific deployment
- 1987 – 1988 Persian Gulf deployment, Operation Earnest Will
- 1988 – Pacific Rim exercise
- 1989 – 1990 Persian Gulf deployment
- 1992 – The ship visited Vladivostok in the Russian Federation, the first ship to do so after the breakup of the Soviet Union.
- 1996 – After three Persian Gulf deployments, 15 bilateral exercises and over 40 port visits, McClusky departs Yokosuka for homeport shift back to San Diego.
- 2000 – First counter-narcotics operations – numerous busts and drug seizures
- 2002 – Counter-drug operations, and rescue of Richard Van Pham, shift ISIC from Destroyer Squadron 7 (DesRon 7) to Destroyer Squadron 1
- 2003 – INSURV and Battle "E" Winner – Counter-drug ops
- 2011 – Battle "E" Winner(6th award) and NAVSTA San Diego Energy Efficiency Award (FFG Class) winner, commanded by Commander Darren Glaser.
- December 2012 – As of 2012, McClusky was commanded by Commander Murz Morris, and in the later half of the year deployed with Carrier Strike Group One. During the 112th session of Congress, a proposal was made to grant the transfers of the USS McClusky and the USS Curts to the Mexican Navy.
- McClusky ended a three-month restricted-availability period in January 2013.
- 2013 – Scored above class average during INSURV and 2013 Battle "E" Winner, commanded by Commander Murz Morris.
- 2014 – 10 April the final deployment/voyage of the USS McClusky.
- 2015 – 14 January, decommissioned in San Diego.
- 2018 – 19 July, sunk as a target during RIMPAC 2018.
