= U. S. Grant Sharp Jr. =

United States Navy admiral

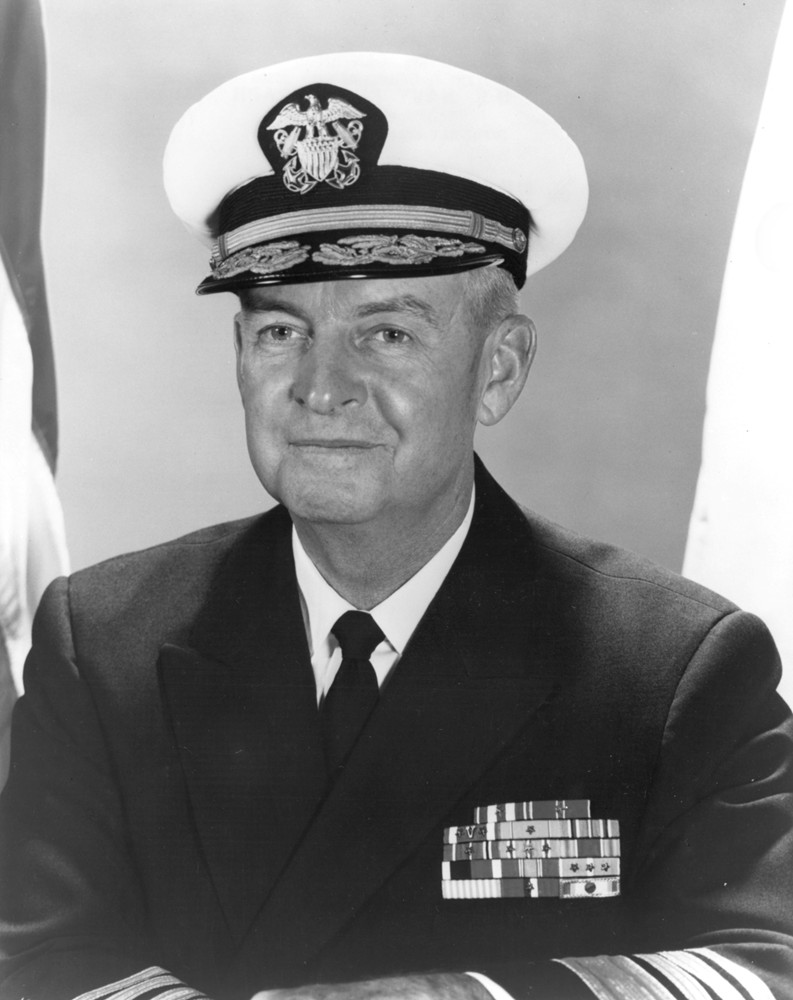
- Ulysses S. Grant Sharp Jr.
- Born: Ulysses Simpson Grant Sharp Jr. April 2, 1906; Chinook, Montana, U.S.
- Died: December 12, 2001 (aged 95); San Diego, California, U.S.
- Burial place: Fort Rosecrans National Cemetery, San Diego
- Military career
- Allegiance: United States
- Branch: United States Navy
- Service years: 1927–1968
- Rank: Admiral
- Nickname: Oley
- Commands: United States Pacific Command; United States Pacific Fleet; United States First Fleet; USS Boyd
- Conflicts: World War II; Korean War; Vietnam War
- Awards: Navy Distinguished Service Medal (2); Army Distinguished Service Medal; Silver Star (2); Bronze Star Medal (2); Navy and Marine Corps Commendation Medal (3) with Combat V

Ulysses Simpson Grant Sharp Jr. (April 2, 1906 – December 12, 2001) was a four-star admiral of the United States Navy who served as Commander-in-Chief, United States Pacific Fleet (CINCPACFLT) from 1963 to 1964; and Commander-in-Chief, United States Pacific Command (CINCPAC) from 1964 to 1968. He was the serving CINCPAC during the Gulf of Tonkin Incident, the event which largely precipitated the United States' involvement in the Vietnam War. Sharp was related to and namesake of Ulysses S. Grant, who married Sharp's great-aunt.

== Military career ==
Sharp was born in Chinook, Montana, and named for Ulysses S. Grant, who was married to his grandmother's sister. Raised in Fort Benton, Montana, he graduated from the United States Naval Academy in 1927. He is also a 1950 graduate of the Naval War College.

During World War II, he commanded the destroyer USS Boyd in the Pacific Theater, earning two Silver Stars.

His brother, Lieutenant Commander Thomas F. Sharp (USNA class of 1935), was reported lost on May 13, 1943 when his submarine USS Pickerel was sunk during its seventh combat patrol of the World War II Pacific campaign.

By the Korean War, he was commanding a destroyer squadron, assisting in the planning of the Inchon landing. He served as deputy chief of naval operations for policy and planning in the early 1960s.

After receiving his fourth star, Sharp took command of the Pacific Fleet in 1963, followed by command of Pacific Command. During his tenure, due to the Tonkin Gulf Incident, the U.S. increased its presence in Vietnam after the passage of the Gulf of Tonkin Resolution. Sharp's views on U.S. strategy in the war, namely massive military action, differed sharply with the Johnson administration's preference for a gradual buildup of forces. Sharp was featured on the August 14, 1964, cover of TIME Magazine.

== Awards and decorations ==

Navy Distinguished Service Medal w/ 1 gold award star
Army Distinguished Service Medal	Silver Star w/ award star	Bronze Star w/ award star
Navy and Marine Corps Commendation Medal w/ Valor Device and 2 award stars	American Defense Service Medal w/ 1 bronze service star	American Campaign Medal
European-African-Middle Eastern Campaign Medal w/ 1 service star	Asiatic-Pacific Campaign Medal w/ 7 service stars	World War II Victory Medal
Navy Occupation Service Medal	National Defense Service Medal w/ 1 service star	Korea Service Medal w/ 3 campaign stars
Korea Presidential Unit Citation	Philippine Liberation Medal w/ 1 service star	United Nations Korea Medal

== Post military career ==
After retiring from the Navy, Sharp was a critic of U.S. policy in the Vietnam War, lecturing frequently and writing articles. He wrote an article in Reader's Digest in 1969 titled We Could Have Won in Vietnam Long Ago, and in 1979 his book Strategy for Defeat: Vietnam in Retrospect was published.

His first wife, Patricia, whom he married in 1931, died in 1986. In 1988 he married the former Nina Blake.

After suffering a fall in October 2001, Sharp's health steadily declined until he died on December 12, 2001, at his home in San Diego. He was buried in Fort Rosecrans National Cemetery.

== See also ==
- Gulf of Tonkin incident
- McNamara Line

Military offices
Preceded by John H. Sides	Commander in Chief of the United States Pacific Fleet; September 30, 1963 – June 26, 1964	Succeeded by Thomas H. Moorer
Preceded by Harry D. Felt	Commander in Chief, Pacific Command; June 30, 1964 – July 31, 1968	Succeeded by John S. McCain Jr.
