= Richard Van Pham =

Shipwreck survivor

- Born: c. 1940; Vietnam

Richard Van Pham is a US citizen (originally from Vietnam) who survived nearly four months adrift in the Pacific Ocean from late May to September 2002.

== Adrift ==
On May 20, 2002, 62-year-old Pham sailed from Long Beach, California on the Sea Breeze, his 26-foot Columbia 26 Mark I sailboat, and set a course for Catalina Island.

During the voyage, a squall snapped the Sea Breeze's mast and seawater fouled the outboard motor. Although Pham had equipped the Sea Breeze with solar power, the Sea Breeze did not have a working VHF radio so Pham was unable to issue a distress signal. Additionally, Pham had neither filed a float plan, nor did he have a family, so no one reported him missing.

To survive, Pham caught turtles and used the meat for bait to trap seagulls and cormorants, and drank rainwater he collected in a five-gallon bucket. Using pieces of wood he scavenged from the Sea Breeze, Pham cooked the seabirds on a grill and evaporated seawater to preserve meat.

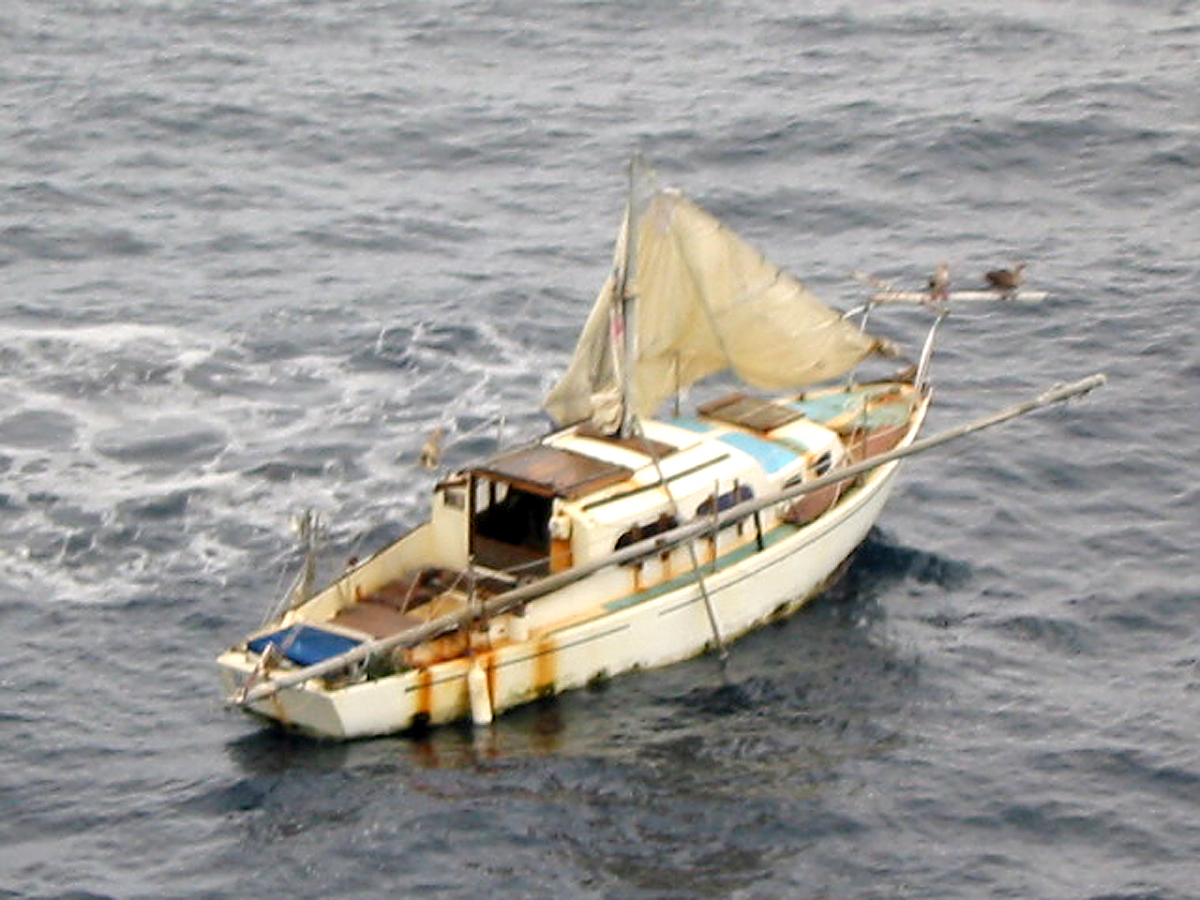
Pham's battered and broken Sea Breeze (taken from USS McClusky)

== Rescue ==
A US Customs P-3 Orion drug-hunting plane spotted the Sea Breeze, notified the USS McClusky of Pham's position, and Pham was rescued on September 17, 2002.

At the time of the rescue, the Sea Breeze was 480 km (300 miles) from the coast of Costa Rica and 4,000 km (2,500 miles) away from his starting point.

McClusky doctors who examined Pham said he had lost nearly 40 pounds during his four months adrift, but was "in pretty good shape." (citation needed)

The Sea Breeze was scuttled and Pham was dropped off at Puerto Quetzal, Guatemala. The McClusky crew bought Pham a plane ticket to Los Angeles, and Pham arrived home on September 24, 2002.

== Controversy ==
Maritime and sailing commentators have questioned the length of time Pham spent adrift. Pham insists he never saw a plane or another boat during the four months he was adrift, but the Gulf of Santa Catalina is one of the busiest channels for recreational and professional sailing and commercial shipping on the western coast of North America.
