= Felix Stump =

United States admiral (1894–1972)

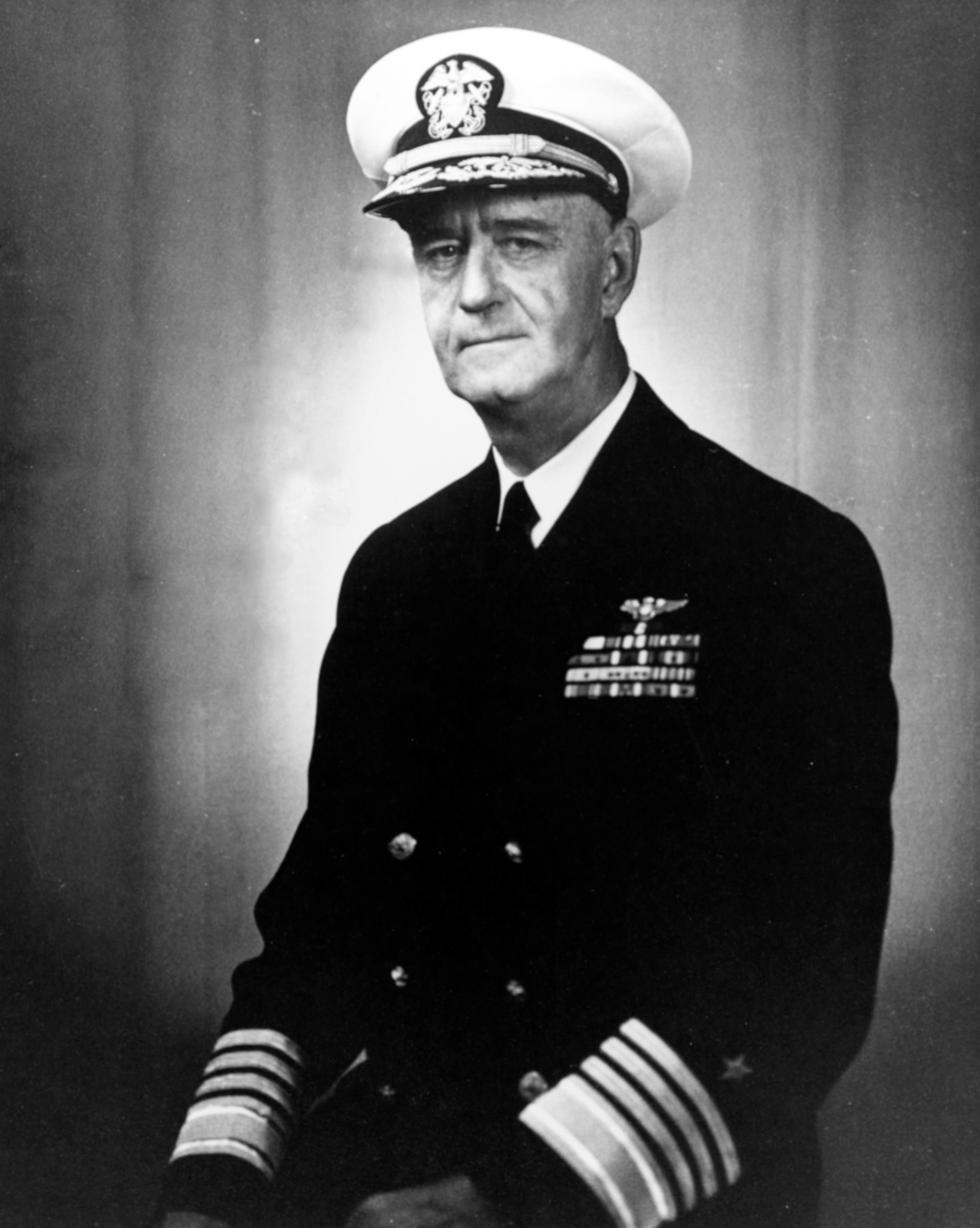
- Stump as CINCPACFLT, c. 1953.
- Born: December 15, 1894; Parkersburg, West Virginia, U.S.
- Died: June 13, 1972 (aged 77); Bethesda Naval Hospital, U.S.
- Military career
- Allegiance: United States
- Branch: United States Navy
- Service years: 1917–1958
- Rank: Admiral
- Commands: USS Langley (CV-1); USS Lexington (CV-16); United States Pacific Command
- Conflicts: World War I World War II
- Awards: Navy Cross (2); Navy Distinguished Service Medal; Army Distinguished Service Medal; Legion of Merit (3); Silver Star

Felix Budwell Stump (December 15, 1894 – June 13, 1972) was an admiral in the United States Navy and Commander, United States Pacific Fleet from July 10, 1953 until July 31, 1958.

== Early life and career ==
Stump was born in Parkersburg, West Virginia, spent his early life there and was appointed to the United States Naval Academy in 1913. He served in the gunboat Yorktown and as navigator aboard the cruiser Cincinnati during World War I in the Atlantic. After the war he served in the pre-dreadnought battleship Alabama. Shortly thereafter Stump attended flight training at the Naval Air Station Pensacola in 1920-1921 followed by postgraduate instruction in Aeronautical Engineering at the Massachusetts Institute of Technology. From 1923 to 1925 he was a Naval Flight Officer in Torpedo Squadron 2 (VT-2) "Doer Birds" of the experimental carrier Langley. He commanded the Cruiser Scouting Wing in 1928-1929 and served on the Staff of Commander Cruisers, Scouting Fleet in 1930–1931. Stump was commanding officer of Saratoga's Scout-Bombing Squadron 2 (VSB-2) in 1936–1937. From 1938 to 1939 he served as navigator of Lexington (CV-2). Promoted to commander in 1940, he served as executive officer of Enterprise.

== World War II ==
At the outbreak of World War II, Stump was Commanding Officer of Langley in Manila Bay, Philippines. In January 1942 he was transferred to the Staff of the Commander in Chief, Asiatic Fleet for which he was awarded the U.S. Army's Distinguished Service Medal.

Stump was the first captain of the Lexington (CV-16) following her commission in 1943.

In 1944 Stump was promoted to Rear Admiral and took command of Task Unit 52.11.2 and Carrier Division 24 embarked on the escort carrier Corregidor for operations against Saipan.

Following action at Saipan, Stump retained commanded Carrier Division 24 but was now assigned to Task Unit 77.4.2 (Taffy II). At the battles of Leyte Gulf and Samar he embarked aboard the Natoma Bay in October 1944. For his role in these battles he was awarded the Navy Cross. His flag remained on Natoma Bay through early 1945 while his sailors continued operations in the Philippines.

In May 1945 he served as Chief of Naval Air Technical Training Command and kept that post until December 1948.

== Post-war ==
From December 1948 to 1951 Stump served as commander of Naval Air Forces Atlantic Fleet, during which time he was promoted to vice admiral. From March 1951 until June 1953, Stump served as Commander, United States Second Fleet.

From July 10, 1953 to January 14, 1958, now promoted to full Admiral, he served as Commander US Pacific Command until his retirement, effective August 1, 1958. After his retirement, he was appointed to the position of Vice Chairman of Directors and Chief Executive Officer of Freedoms Foundation at Valley Forge, Pennsylvania.

Stump died of cancer at Bethesda Naval Hospital in 1972. The Spruance-class destroyer Stump was named in his honor.

== Decorations ==

Naval Aviator Insignia
1st Row	Navy Cross w/ Gold Star	Navy Distinguished Service Medal	Army Distinguished Service Medal
2nd Row	Silver Star	Legion of Merit w/ two Gold Stars and "V" Device	Navy Presidential Unit Citation w/ two citation stars
3rd Row	Navy Unit Commendation w/ Bronze Star	World War I Victory Medal w/ Escort Clasp	American Defense Service Medal w/ Atlantic Clasp
4th Row	American Campaign Medal	Asiatic Pacific Campaign Medal w/ one silver and one bronze service stars	World War II Victory Medal
5th Row	National Defense Service Medal	Philippine Defense Medal	Philippine Liberation Medal w/ two bronze stars

== Gallery ==
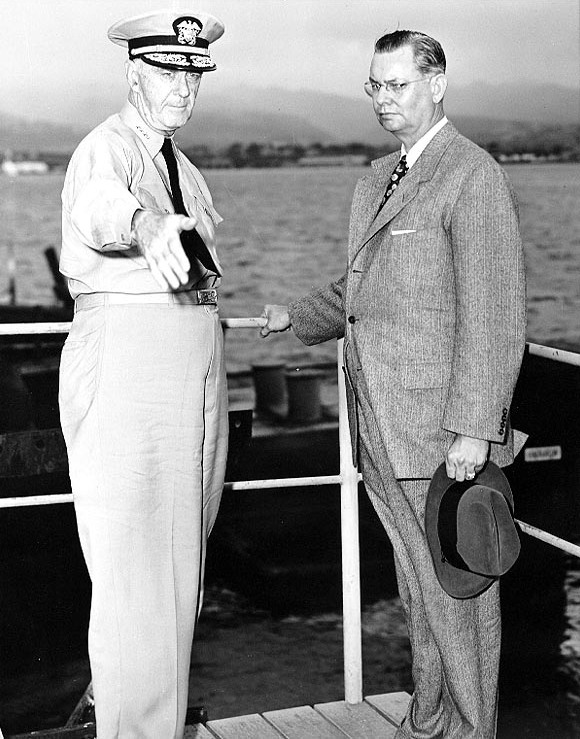
As commander in chief, U.S. Pacific Command, with Secretary of the Navy Robert B. Anderson, November 1953.

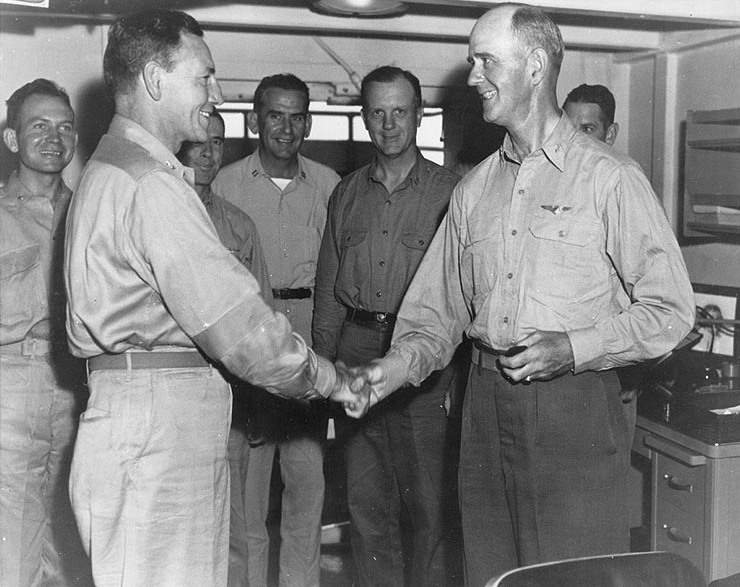
Rear Admiral Felix B. Stump (right) with Rear Admiral Calvin T. Durgin, 1945.

Military offices
Preceded by Arthur W. Radford	Commander in Chief of the United States Pacific Fleet; 1953-1958	Succeeded by Maurice E. Curts
