= United States First Fleet =

Disestablished numbered fleet of the United States Navy

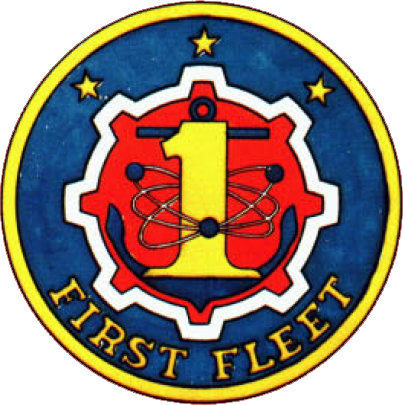
- Founded: 1 July 1947 - February 1973
- Disbanded: 1 February 1973
- Country: United States of America
- Branch: United States Navy
- Part of: United States Pacific Fleet

The First Fleet was a numbered fleet of the United States Navy, in operation from January 1947 to 1 February 1973 in the western Pacific Ocean as part of the Pacific Fleet. In 1973, it was disestablished and its duties assumed by the United States Third Fleet.

== History ==
Established under the Department of Defense after 1947, the First Fleet remained operational until 1 February 1973, primarily in the western Pacific Ocean as part of the Pacific Fleet. In 1973, it was disestablished and its duties assumed by the United States Third Fleet.

Vice Admiral Alfred Montgomery was named as commander, First Task Fleet, in an air station report of July 1947, with an inspection visit by a group of senior officers. The old cruiser Salt Lake City was sunk as an atomic bomb test target during First Task Fleet maneuvers in May 1948. USS Salisbury Sound became the flagship of Vice Admiral Gerald Bogan (Commander First Task Fleet) on 25 March 1949. USS Curtiss served as flagship for Commander First Fleet early in 1949 for three weeks of amphibious operations in Alaskan waters to evaluate cold weather equipment. USS Helena served as flagship for commander, First Fleet, from January 1960 to March 1963. USS Providence served as flagship in San Diego from 1969 until April 1972, except for yard overhaul in 1970 when USS Chicago assumed the role.

On 17 November 2020, Secretary of the Navy Kenneth Braithwaite announced the intention to create a new numbered fleet for the Indian Ocean to be called First Fleet. SECNAV Braithwaite speculated that the new fleet could be headquartered in Singapore or Western Australia.

== Structure, First Fleet, 1 May 1945 ==
- Commander First Fleet, Fleet Admiral Chester Nimitz, Cincpac
- Commander Battleship Squadron One Vice Admiral Jesse B. Oldendorf
- Commander Battleship Squadron Two Vice Admiral Willis A. Lee Jr.
- Commander Cruisers, Pacific Fleet Rear Admiral Walden L. Ainsworth
- Commander, Air Force, Pacific Fleet Vice Admiral George D. Murray
- Commander Destroyers, Pacific Fleet Rear Admiral Walden L. Ainsworth
- Commander Submarine Force, Pacific Fleet Vice Admiral Charles A. Lockwood
- Commander Amphibious Forces, Pacific Fleet Vice Admiral Richmond K. Turner
- Commander Motor Torpedo Boat Squadrons, Pacific Fleet Capt. Richard W. Bates
- Commander Minecraft, Pacific Fleet Rear Admiral Alexander Sharp Jr.
- Commander Service Force, Pacific Fleet Vice Admiral William W. Smith
- Commander Fleet Operational Training Command, Pacific Rear Admiral Francis C. Denebrink
- Commander South Pacific Force and South Pacific Area Vice Admiral William L. Calhoun
  - Chief of Staff Commodore R. P. Class
  - Commander Service Squadron, South Pacific Force Rear Admiral Paul Hendren
    - Chief of Staff Captain F. Close

The first ten squadrons and commanders are those of the U.S. Navy type commands in the Pacific Fleet active at the time.

== Commanders ==
The Navy website says, regarding this list of commanders, that "..This position was originally titled Commander, Central Pacific Force. On 26 April 1944 it was renamed Commander, Fifth Fleet. It then became Commander, First Task Fleet on 1 January 1947. It was subsequently renamed First Fleet on 11 February 1950. The Command was combined with ASW Forces Pacific and became Third Fleet as of 1 February 1973."

- Admiral Raymond A. Spruance (5 August 1943 – 8 November 1945) (Central Pacific Force and Fifth Fleet)
- Admiral John H. Towers (8 November 1945 – 18 January 1946) (Fifth Fleet)
- Admiral Frederick C. Sherman (18 January – 3 September 1946) (Fifth Fleet)
- Admiral Alfred E. Montgomery (5 September 1946 – 14 August 1947) (Fifth Fleet and First Task Fleet)
- Vice Admiral George D. Murray (14 August 1947 – August 1948) (First Task Fleet)
- Vice Admiral Laurance T. DuBose (August 1948 – 8 January 1949) (First Task Fleet)
- Vice Admiral Gerald F. Bogan (8 January 1949 – 1 February 1950) (First Task Fleet)
- Vice Admiral Thomas L. Sprague (1 February – March 1950) (First Task Fleet and First Fleet)
- Vice Admiral Calvin T. Durgin (March 1950 – 15 February 1951) (First Fleet)
- Vice Admiral Harold M. Martin (15 February – 28 March 1951)
- Vice Admiral Arthur D. Struble (28 March 1951 – 24 March 1952)
- Vice Admiral Joseph J. Clark (24 March – 20 May 1952)
- Vice Admiral Ingolf N. Kiland (20 May – 16 July 1952)
- Vice Admiral Ralph A. Ofstie (16 July 1952 – 23 February 1953)
- Vice Admiral Harold M. Martin (23 February – 1 October 1953)
- Vice Admiral William K. Phillips (1 October 1953 – 1 August 1955)
- Vice Admiral Herbert G. Hopwood (1 August 1955 – 18 June 1956)
- Vice Admiral Robert L. Dennison (18 June 1956 – 23 July 1958)
- Vice Admiral Ruthven F. Libby (23 July 1958 – 30 April 1960)
- Vice Admiral U.S. Grant Sharp Jr. (30 April – 14 July 1960)
- Vice Admiral Charles L. Melson (14 July 1960 – 12 April 1962)
- Vice Admiral Frank Virden (12 April – 5 May 1962)
- Vice Admiral Robert T. Keith (5 May 1962 – 11 December 1963)
- Vice Admiral Paul D. Stroop (5 May 1962 – 25 January 1964)
- Vice Admiral Ephraim P. Holmes (25 January – 18 July 1964)
- Vice Admiral Lawson P. Ramage (18 July 1964 – 29 July 1966)
- Vice Admiral Bernard F. Roeder (29 July 1966 – 30 September 1969)
- Vice Admiral Isaac C. Kidd Jr. (30 September 1969 – 1 August 1970)
- Vice Admiral Raymond E. Peet (1 August 1970 – 15 May 1972)
- Vice Admiral Nels B. Johnson (15 May – 17 July 1972)
- Vice Admiral James F. Calvert (17 July 1972 – 30 January 1973)
