= Jackson D. Arnold =

United States admiral (1912–2007)

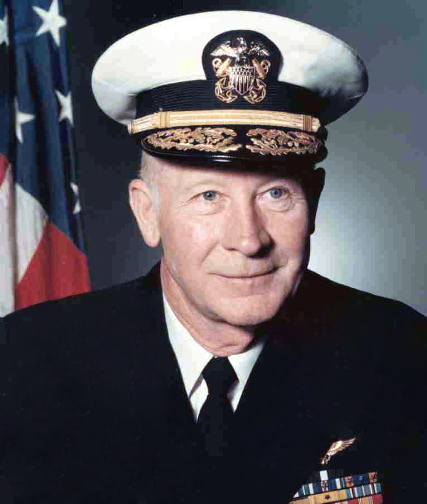
- Arnold in 1971
- Born: November 3, 1912; Gainesville, Florida, U.S.
- Died: December 8, 2007 (aged 95); Encinitas, California, U.S.
- Military career
- Allegiance: United States of America
- Branch: United States Navy
- Service years: 1934–1971
- Rank: Admiral
- Nickname: "Jack"
- Commands: Naval Material Command
- Conflicts: World War II: Attack on Pearl Harbor; Battle of the Philippine Sea; Cold War
- Awards: Navy Cross; Navy Distinguished Service Medal; Silver Star; Distinguished Flying Cross (2); Air Medal (8)

Jackson Dominick Arnold (November 3, 1912 – December 8, 2007) was a four-star admiral in the United States Navy who served as Chief of Naval Material (CNM) from 1970 to 1971.

== Early life and education ==
Arnold was born in Gainesville, Florida, the first of five children of U.S. Army Major Albert C. "AC" Arnold and the former Irene Dominick. A far-ranging adventurer, AC Arnold had fought in the Boer War on the side of the Boers; joined the Seventh Cavalry as a trooper; been a riverboat gambler; fought beside Brigadier General John J. Pershing on the Mexico Punitive Expedition; been awarded a Distinguished Service Cross for actions with the 1/326 Infantry at Château-Thierry during World War I; gone to law school; and been assigned to several positions in the peacetime Army before rejoining the Seventh at Fort Lewis, Washington, where he died in 1932.

Jack grew up in army postings around the United States. He was proud of accidentally "taking the chicken" from then-Colonel Douglas MacArthur while serving MacArthur dinner in Washington, D.C. MacArthur informed Jack that he was the second Arnold to take MacArthur's chicken; during World War I, AC had taken an entire chicken dinner from MacArthur while he was in a bunker during a shelling.

== Career ==
Jack was appointed to the United States Naval Academy in Annapolis, Maryland from Fort Lewis, Washington, where his father was serving as judge advocate general for the Seventh Cavalry and was responsible for federal law west of the Mississippi River. Jack lettered in tennis at the Naval Academy, and graduated with the Class of 1934 at the age of 21.

Like all Naval Academy graduates of the time, he served his first tour in what is now the Surface Warfare Community. After two years aboard the battleship Arizona as her Number 4 Turret Officer, he was selected for training as a naval aviator. Designated Naval Aviator 5551 upon graduating from Pensacola in 1937, his orders were signed by Captain William F. Halsey.

=== Naval aviator ===
His first assignment as a naval aviator was as Material Officer with Torpedo Squadron Six, flying Douglas TBD Devastators aboard the aircraft carrier Enterprise on her maiden voyage, which included a goodwill tour of South America. During a port call in Buenos Aires, Argentina, Lieutenant (junior grade) Arnold was awarded a medal from the government of Argentina for saving the life of President Roberto María Ortiz during an assassination attempt. Arnold attended the state dinner that night in his dress whites, complete with blood spatters at the President's request.

In 1938, he was assigned as the Senior Aviator for Cruiser Scouting Squadron Eight aboard the light cruiser Savannah, flying Curtiss SOC-1 Seagull floatplanes. His most memorable aviation experience occurred during this tour when he performed night test flights to see if a floatplane could be operated in blackout conditions at sea. The conclusion was that it could, but probably not with the same pilot for more than one flight.

His next assignment was to Ford Island, Pearl Harbor in 1940, as the Engineering Test Pilot, where he met his wife-to-be, Muriel McChesney.

=== Attack on Pearl Harbor ===
During the Japanese attack on Pearl Harbor on 7 December 1941, then-Lieutenant Arnold made his way to Pearl Harbor under fire. After quite a bit of trouble convincing the crew of a whaleboat to take him to Ford Island, his normal duty station, he finally got to the island. There, during the middle of the first wave's attack, he fired up the only flyable Grumman F4F Wildcat fighter on the island. A ground crew member crawled up on the wing telling him, "You can't take this airplane!" "The heck I can't, get off my wing!" Arnold replied. "But it doesn't have any ammunition!" came the response.

Arnold jumped out of the airplane near the base of the airfield control tower and picked up a Browning Automatic Rifle (BAR) from a Marine who did not need it anymore. A member of the All Navy Pistol Team and a longtime pistol and bird shooter, Arnold was an excellent marksman, and shot down a torpedo plane coming in to strafe the new control tower next to which he was standing. The plane crashed on the field. Between the two waves, Jack and a couple of sailors went over to look at the wreckage. Discovering it belonged to the first wave's Torpedo Squadron Commander, they drank the downed pilot's sake and returned to the battle. That kill from the ground was later to make Jack the only known pilot who shot down five aircraft (one with a BAR, two with a Grumman TBF Avenger torpedo bomber, and two with a Grumman F6F Hellcat fighter) who was not an ace.

During the lull between attacks he commandeered a motor whaleboat and began picking up survivors from Arizona and other ships in the harbor. The first person his boat pulled from the water was the Petty Officer in Charge of the Number Four turret on Arizona. Jack did not recognize him as he looked like a seal, black with oil head to toe.

Before leaving Pearl Harbor, he married Muriel McChesney on 16 January 1942.

=== Carrier Group Two ===
Then-Lieutenant Commander Arnold was sent to at Naval Air Station Quonset Point as Commander Torpedo Squadron Two, whose patch he designed, flying the new TBF Avenger torpedo bomber with the newly forming Carrier Air Group TWO. The Group was assigned to new aircraft carrier Hornet for her first war cruise. After a short time, then-Commander Arnold was designated Commander Air Group TWO, callsign "Ripper Leader", flying the F6-F Hellcat fighter.

The job of Air Group Commander (CAG) brought a new challenge. The job was offered at 2200, the night before the invasion of Iwo Jima, where Hornet was to play a pivotal role in close air support. The first takeoff was at 0430, to allow the aircraft to be over the beach 30 minutes prior to sunrise. Although an experienced pilot with flight time in an extremely wide variety of aircraft, Arnold had never flown a Hellcat. After planning the attack, he went down to the flight deck and boarded the CAG aircraft with its 99 on the nose. With a flashlight under a blanket, he familiarized himself with the aircraft, then went to his room for a brief rest. The self-checkout must have worked. He made his first Hellcat takeoff at night, into combat. On that very first flight he got the only two kills he was to get in the Hellcat.

At the Battle of the Philippine Sea, he was handed a contact report that indicated the possible presence of the enemy fleet at a point too far west for a round-trip flight. Eager for battle, he declared that regardless of how far west the enemy was found, he would lead an attack, regroup as many planes as possible, and fly eastward until fuel ran out. He felt that a mass ditching would allow the downed aircrews to support each other until the arrival of the task force, which would be summoned to their location with Morse code messages prior to ditching. During the actual attack, he personally scored a damaging near miss on the aircraft carrier Zuikaku, then led his flight back to base and assisted several in his group in landing in darkness under extremely difficult conditions before boarding the carrier himself, a feat for which he was awarded the Navy Cross.

Hornet and her Air Group supported operations in Palau, Guam, Iwo Jima, Saipan and Tinian and the Battle of the Philippine Sea. During the cruise, he flew 165 combat hours, made 4 Japanese aircraft kills, and was awarded the Navy Cross, a Silver Star, a Distinguished Service Medal, two Distinguished Flying Crosses and eight Air Medals. Air Group Two finished the war after two cruises as the Pacific's highest scoring Air Group in terms of tonnage sunk and the second in terms of air-to-air kills.

=== Postwar ===
After his tour as CAG, he was assigned to Washington, D.C. for staff tours, serving in the Aviation Plans Division of the office of the deputy chief of naval operations from 1944 to 1946 and as head of the Integrated Aeronautic Program Unit with additional duty as secretary of the Air Planning Group from 1946 to 1947.

He returned to sea in 1948 as Air Officer aboard the aircraft carrier Boxer. He was in the first group to check out in the McDonnell Phantom (later the Phantom I), the first carrier-borne jet fighter. After that tour, he was offered command of Boxer. With the absolute independence he was known for, he said, "No thank you. I have been at sea since 1934, I'd like a stateside tour, then I'll be happy to take her to sea."

=== Chief of Naval Material ===
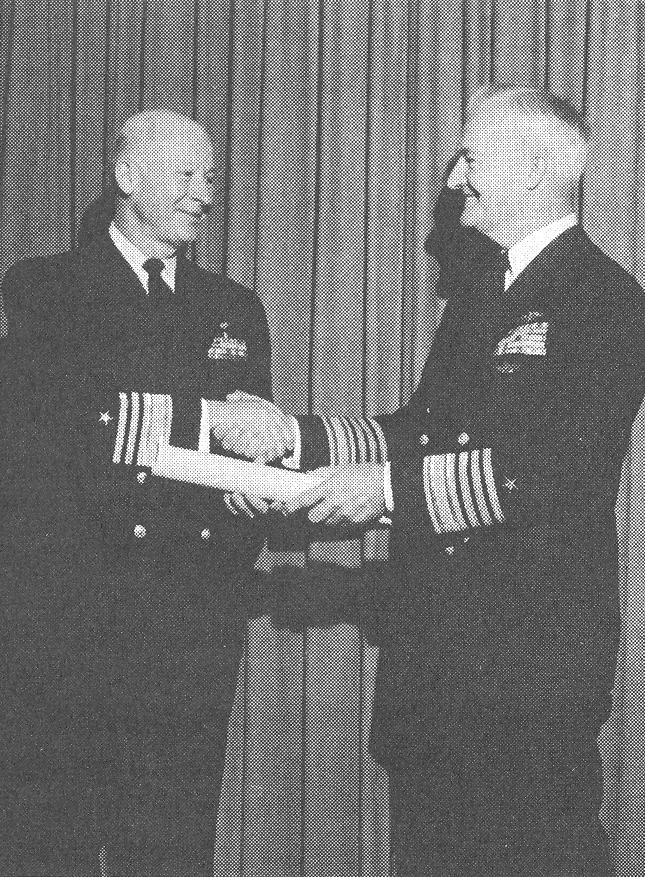
Receiving promotion to vice admiral from Admiral Ignatius J. Galantin (right), 1969.

Jack was designated an Aeronautical Engineering Duty Officer and assigned to Naval Air Station North Island as the Overhaul and Repair Officer. There he met the man who was to be his best friend and neighbor, Commander Johnny Olson, who had joined the Navy as a Ship's Carpenter in 1903 and was now the Commander of the Aircraft Repair and Overhaul Unit.

After another staff tour, Arnold attended Harvard University, where he got his Masters in Business Administration in 1952. Subsequent assignments in the various Bureaus of Aeronautics, Weapons and Materiel, culminating in an assignment as the Force Material Officer on the staff of Commander Naval Air Force, U.S. Pacific Fleet in 1963, gave Arnold a well-rounded background which made him the logical choice to succeed Admiral Ignatius J. Galantin as the final Chief of the Bureau of Naval Materiel and the first Commander of the newly formed Naval Material Command. The fact that he kept current as a Naval Aviator made him a standout choice for promotion.

He became Deputy Chief of Naval Material for Logistic Support in 1966, Vice Chief of Naval Material in 1967, and Chief of Naval Material in June 1970. He was advanced to the rank of full admiral on October 14, 1970, the first restricted line officer to attain that rank.

He retired from the Navy on November 30, 1971, and was replaced at Naval Material Command by a longtime friend and shipmate, Admiral Isaac C. Kidd, Jr.

== Personal life ==
After moving around the country and being at sea for years, Arnold retired to Rancho Santa Fe, California, where he built a home of his own design for himself and his wife Muriel. They were both active in the Rancho Santa Fe Garden Club and other activities in the community.

In retirement, Arnold stayed active in aviation, joining the Cubic Corporation Board of Directors, the Golden Eagles, the San Diego Aerospace Museum and various other naval aviation oriented groups. Ever the artist, he continued drawing and working in his garden. Occasionally, he would put an entry into the Rancho Santa Fe Garden Club show, almost always gaining a ribbon or two. Towards the end of his life, Jack spent most of his time in his living room watching television. He loved to watch cavalry, western, and action movies. A particular favorite was Walker, Texas Ranger.

Arnold died in Encinitas, California, on December 8, 2007, at the age of 95. He was buried with full military honors in Fort Rosecrans National Cemetery, next to his wife.

== Awards and decorations ==

Naval Aviator Badge
Navy Cross
Navy Distinguished Service Medal	Silver Star	Distinguished Flying Cross w/ one 5/16" Gold Star
Air Medal w/ one 5/16" Silver Star and two 5/16" Gold Stars	Combat Action Ribbon	Presidential Unit Citation w/ one 3/16" Bronze Star
American Defense Service Medal w/ Base Clasp (3/16" Bronze Star)	American Campaign Medal	Asiatic-Pacific Campaign Medal w/ one 3/16" Silver Star
World War II Victory Medal	National Defense Service Medal w/ one 3/16" Bronze Star	Philippine Republic Presidential Unit Citation
Philippine Liberation Medal	Navy Rifle Marksmanship Ribbon	Navy Pistol Marksmanship Ribbon

Military offices
Preceded by Ignatius J. Galantin	Chief of Naval Material; June 1970 – November 1971	Succeeded by Isaac C. Kidd, Jr.
