= Office of Naval Material =

In January 1942, the Director of Material and Procurement was appointed to coordinate all material procurement activities of the US Navy. The office would be supervised by the War Production Board until late 1945.

In 1948, the office title was changed to Chief of Division of Material, and in 1984 to Chief of the Office of Naval Material. In 1983, the title was changed to Naval Material Command. On 6 May 1985, the SECNAV secretary John Lehman disestablished the Command. Acquisition functions were passed onto the following Commands: Naval Air Systems Command, Naval Sea Systems Command, Space and Naval Warfare Systems Command, Naval Facilities Engineering Command, Naval Supply Systems Command, and the Strategic Systems Program Office. The Office of Naval Acquisition Support was established to create acquisition support for functions that span across Commands, and that require a degree of independence in their operations.

In 2009, the Information Warfare Community, originally known as the Information Dominance Corps, was created within the U.S. Navy to more effectively and collaboratively lead and manage officers, enlisted, and civilian professionals who possess extensive skills in information-intensive related fields.

Since 2014, the office of Naval Material Naval and Information Warfare Community has been housed within the U.S. Navy Information Forces (NAVIFOR). NAVIFOR was originally established on Oct. 1, 2014, as Information Dominance Forces Command. NAVIFOR is the global readiness-focused type command responsible for organizing, manning, training and equipping, and identifying requirements for all information warfare (IW) capabilities.

	Chief of Naval Material	Tenure
1	RADM (ADM) Samuel M. Robinson	1942–1945
2	VADM (ADM) Ben Moreell	1946
3	VADM Edward L. Cochrane	1947
4	VADM Arthur C. Miles	1948–1949
5	VADM Edwin D. Foster	1950
6	VADM Albert G. Noble	1951
7	VADM Charles W. Fox	1952–1953
8	VADM John Gingrich	1954
9	VADM Murrey L. Royar	1955
10	VADM Edward W. Clexton	February 1956 – 1960
11	VADM George F. Beardsley	July 1960 – 1963
12	VADM William A. Schoech	July 1963 – 1965
13	VADM (ADM) Ignatius J. Galantin	March 1965 – 1970
14	VADM (ADM) Jackson D. Arnold	June 1970 – 1971
15	ADM Isaac C. Kidd Jr.	December 1971 – 1975
16	ADM Frederick H. Michaelis	April 1975 – 1978
17	ADM Alfred J. Whittle Jr.	August 1978 – 1981
18	ADM John G. Williams Jr.	July 1981 – 1983
19	ADM Steve A. White	August 1983 – 1985

== See also ==
- Ship Characteristics Board
- United States Navy bureau system
- United States Army Services of Supply
- Army Service Forces
