= John E. Gingrich =

United States Navy admiral (1897–1960)

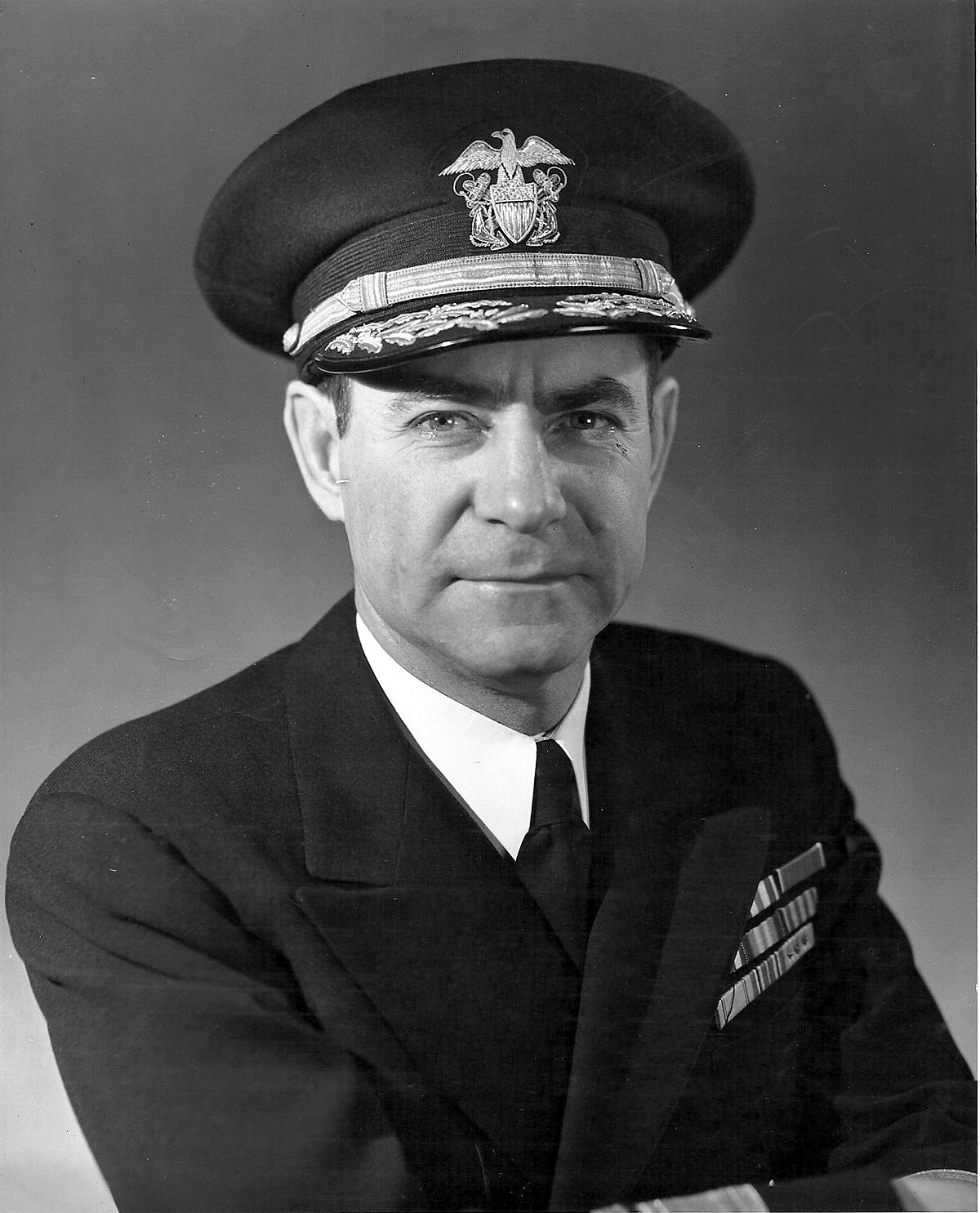
- ADM John E. Gingrich
- Born: February 23, 1897; Dodge City, Kansas, U.S.
- Died: May 26, 1960 (aged 63); New York City, New York, U.S.
- Military career
- Allegiance: United States of America
- Branch: United States Navy
- Service years: 1919–1954
- Rank: Admiral
- Nickname: Johnny
- Conflicts: World War II; Korean War
- Awards: Distinguished Service Medal; Silver Star; Legion of Merit (2); Navy Commendation Medal

Admiral John Edward Gingrich (February 23, 1897 – May 26, 1960) was an officer in the United States Navy who served as the first chief of security for the United States Atomic Energy Commission from 1947 to 1949, and as Chief of Naval Material from 1953 to 1954. He retired from the Navy as a four-star admiral.

== Early career ==
Born in Dodge City, Kansas, to Edward Grant Gingrich and the former Bertha Allen, he attended the University of Kansas before receiving an appointment to the United States Naval Academy at Annapolis, Maryland, in 1915. He graduated from the Naval Academy on June 7, 1919, and was commissioned an ensign in the United States Navy.

His first assignment was aboard the battleship Pennsylvania, flagship of the Atlantic Fleet. From January 1920 to July 1921 he served as assistant communication officer on the staff of Admiral Henry B. Wilson, Jr., Commander in Chief, Atlantic Fleet. In August 1921 he was transferred from Pennsylvania to the newly commissioned battleship Maryland, where he remained until June 1925, when he returned to the Naval Academy for a two-year tour as an instructor in the Department of Navigation.

From May 1927 to July 1930 he served as gunnery officer aboard the armored cruiser Rochester, which operated in the Caribbean Sea during interventions in Nicaragua and Haiti. He spent the next two years with the Naval Reserve Officer Training Corps Unit at Northwestern University in Evanston, Illinois. He commanded the fleet tug Algorma from June 1932 until April 1934, then served aboard the heavy cruiser Indianapolis until June 1935.

He next reported to Washington, D.C., for duty in the Navy Department's Hydrographic Office. During this tour, he helped complete a new set of precomputed tables to assist aviators and navigators in calculating their positions. Published in 1936, the new Aerial and Marine Navigation Tables were a vast improvement over the previous Ageton tables in terms of ease of calculation and accuracy, and were used for years afterward. He served as head of the Hydrographic Office's research division until 1937.

From June 1937 to June 1939, he served afloat as aide and flag secretary on the staff of Commander Battleship Division 3, Battle Force, aboard the division flagship Idaho. He remained with the fleet for a third year as navigator of the battleship New Mexico.

== World War II ==
=== Naval aide to James V. Forrestal ===
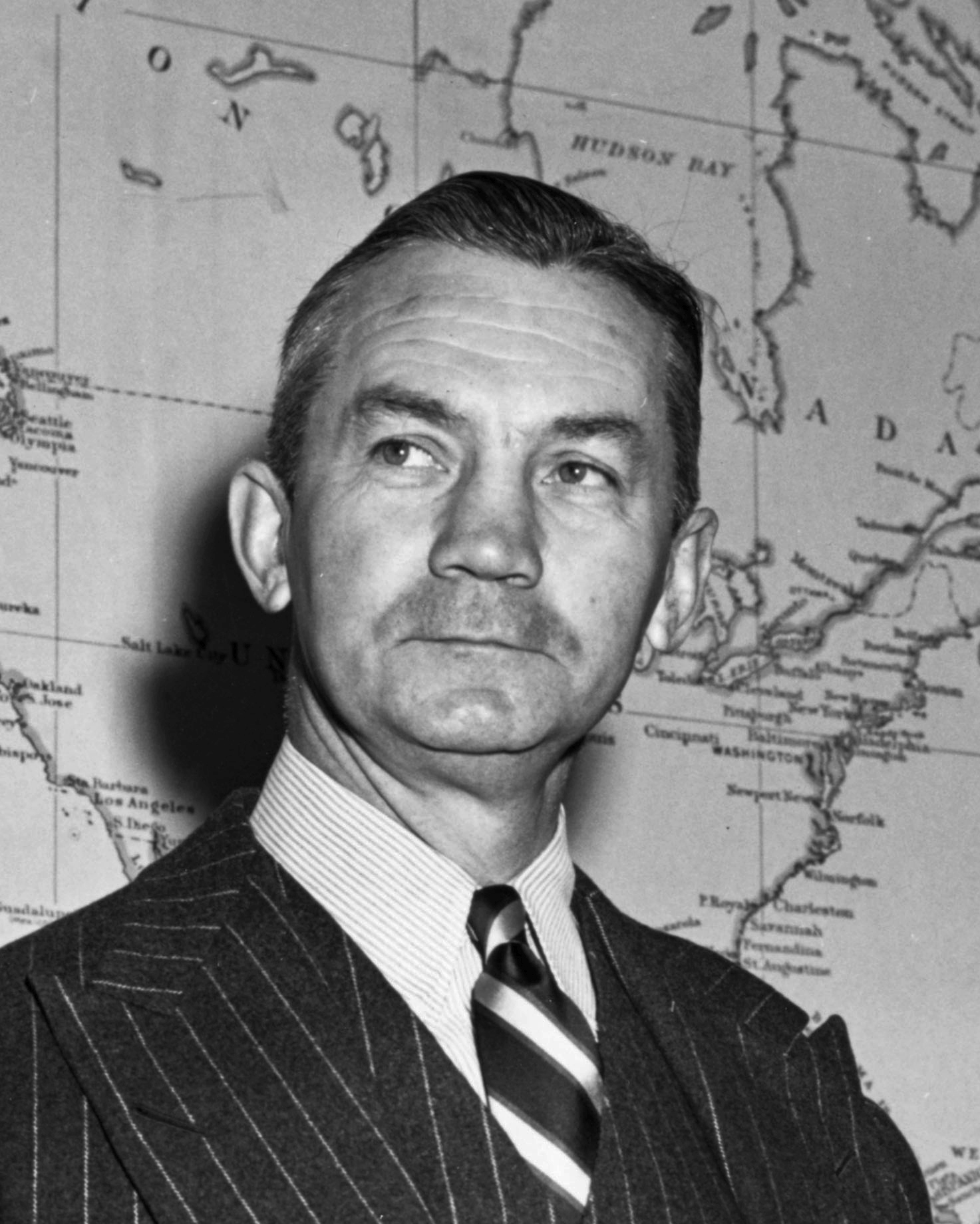
Secretary of the Navy James V. Forrestal.

Returning to Washington, he served as secretary of the General Board of the Navy before being assigned as naval aide to the inaugural Under Secretary of the Navy, James V. Forrestal. Gingrich served as Forrestal's aide from August 1940 to July 1944.

The responsibilities of the Under Secretary and his staff had not yet been defined when Gingrich reported to the newly sworn-in Forrestal. Asked what he would like his naval aide to do, Forrestal replied, "Take off your coat and get to work." "Don't you want to check on my qualifications?" "No." Gingrich's first problem was to find the Under Secretary an office in the Main Navy Building; his solution was to evict the Chief of Naval Operations from the suite adjacent to the Secretary of the Navy's office.

Unlike the typical naval aide to a civilian secretary, whose duties are normally limited to managing the secretary's social schedule and office logistics, Gingrich quickly became a full-fledged policy assistant for military affairs. After Gingrich left his service, Forrestal wrote to President Harry S. Truman that "He was invaluable to me, being far above the ordinary officer in his understanding of the Navy's relations with the public and with civilians."

Gingrich's service as Forrestal's aide made him an enemy of Admiral Ernest J. King, Commander in Chief of the United States Fleet and Chief of Naval Operations, who resented Gingrich's outsized policy role and perceived Gingrich as being more loyal to Forrestal, a civilian political appointee, than to King, his uniformed superior. Gingrich crossed King more blatantly when Forrestal succeeded Frank Knox as Secretary of the Navy. King and his senior admirals had effectively excluded Knox from major war decisions by only showing him routine communications from the fleet and neglecting to present the important messages, which they handled themselves. Alerted to this practice, Gingrich advised Forrestal to go to the Navy Department communication room and examine all incoming telegrams for himself. Armed with this information, Forrestal was able to exert more influence over Navy Department operations than his predecessor, at King's expense.

King eventually came to suspect that Gingrich was the éminence grise behind many of the actions taken in Forrestal's name. Whenever the admiral passed the aide in the hallway, King would greet Gingrich with a sarcastic "Good morning, Commander," and a deep, mocking bow.

=== USS Pittsburgh (CA-72) ===
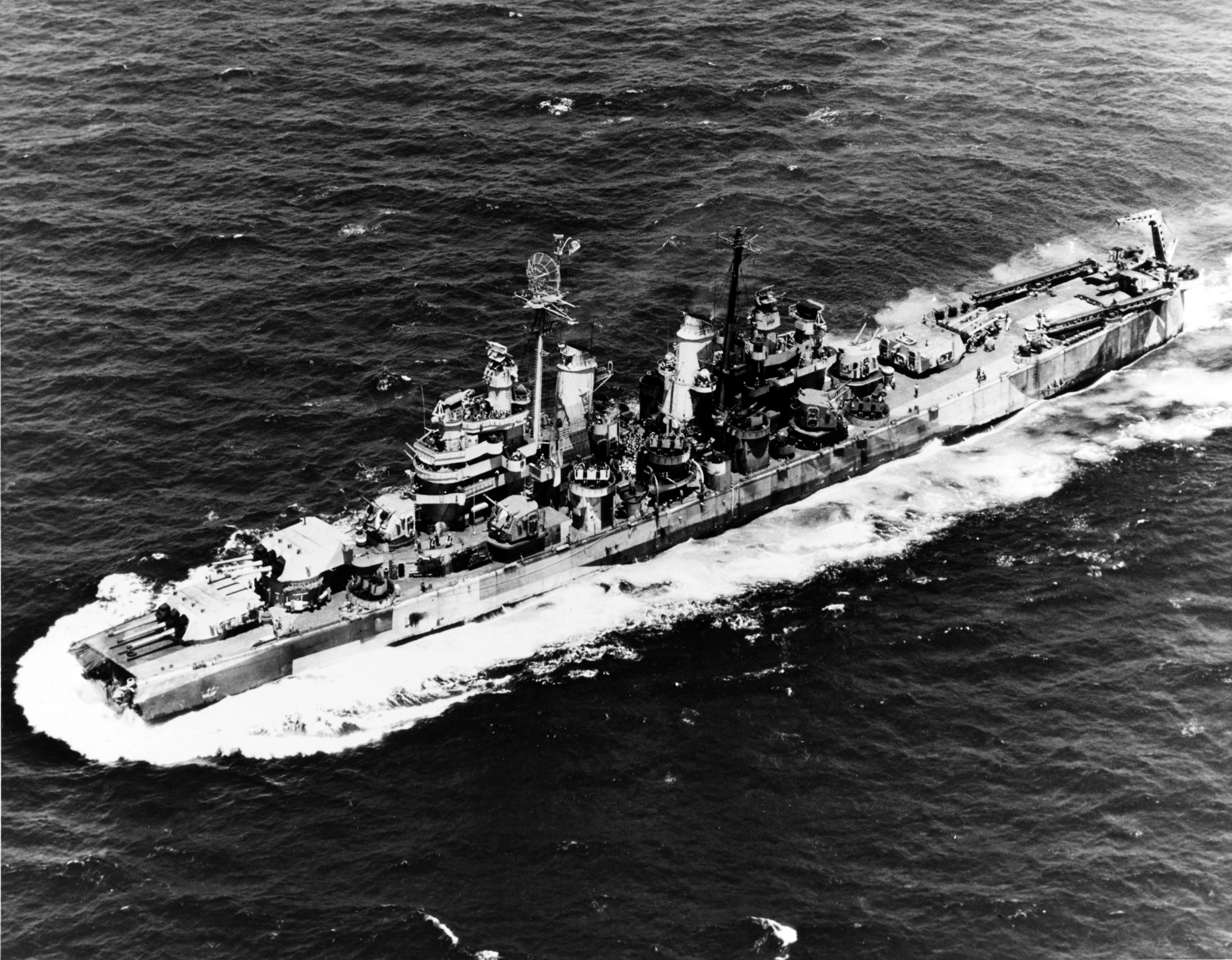
USS Pittsburgh, following typhoon damage.

Forrestal finally released Gingrich to fight in the Pacific theater after Gingrich protested that he was being "kept out of the war." Assigned to fit out the new heavy cruiser Pittsburgh, he served as Pittsburgh's first commanding officer from that cruiser's commissioning on October 10, 1944, until September 3, 1945. For outstanding service in that role, he was awarded the Silver Star, the Legion of Merit, and a Gold Star in lieu of a second Legion of Merit.

On March 19, 1945, the aircraft carrier Franklin was crippled by a kamikaze attack close to the Japanese mainland. Aflame and dead in the water, Franklin was still under attack by kamikaze planes and threatening to explode when Gingrich maneuvered Pittsburgh close enough to take the burning carrier under tow, protecting Franklin with antiaircraft fire until the carrier was able to work enough speed to proceed to Pearl Harbor under its own power. For helping to rescue Franklin at great risk to his own ship, Gingrich was awarded the Silver Star "for conspicuous gallantry and intrepidity".

As captain of Pittsburgh, Gingrich became famous for sailing his ship safely to port after 15 percent of the cruiser's length was torn off by a typhoon, an act of seamanship dubbed a "miracle" by contemporary accounts. On June 5, 1945, Pittsburgh was returning with the Third Fleet from a carrier strike against Kyūshū when the fleet encountered heavy weather between Okinawa and the Philippine Islands. As winds rose to 70 knots (130 km/h) and waves reached heights of 100 feet (30 m), Pittsburgh was buffeted by two enormous waves that ripped off 104 feet (32 m) of the cruiser's bow, which tossed unpredictably in front of the ship. Gingrich immediately ordered the engines into reverse to pull Pittsburgh away from the dangerous obstacle, simultaneously trying to prevent the critically damaged ship from capsizing. Pittsburgh was saved from sinking by superlative damage control efforts by its crew, notably Gingrich's executive officer, future four-star admiral Horacio Rivero, Jr.

Once the storm passed, Pittsburgh found itself in calm waters 900 miles from Guam. "There was nothing to it from then on," Gingrich recalled. Pittsburgh arrived at Guam five days after the storm and was equipped with a temporary bow, leaving two weeks later for permanent repairs at Puget Sound Navy Yard in Washington. A week after Pittsburgh departed, the ship's bow was discovered afloat and towed back to Guam. The 500-mile separation between the cruiser's stern and bow led contemporary news accounts to dub Pittsburgh "the longest ship in the Navy."

Regaling the press after Pittsburgh's safe arrival in port, Gingrich declared, "I'm sorry I can't give you an immortal phrase to hand down to posterity. But all I said was 'reverse engines'." He did not believe the fracture could be blamed on a structural fault. "It just took two heavy seas. It couldn't possibly have held any longer. She's a fine staunch ship. We'll get the bow fixed and go right back out again." Pittsburgh remained under repair at Puget Sound when the war ended in August.

=== Director of Naval Reserve ===
Gingrich departed Pittsburgh in September 1945 and served briefly as chief of staff and aide to Vice Admiral John H. Towers, Commander, Second Carrier Task Force, Pacific Fleet, before being abruptly reassigned to the much less significant role of chief of personnel in Miami, Florida. The sudden transfer was viewed as a punitive exile imposed by outgoing Chief of Naval Operations King and Chief of Naval Personnel Randall Jacobs to deny Secretary Forrestal an ally in the bureaucratic battle King and Jacobs were waging against Forrestal over the direction of the postwar Navy. Forrestal resolved the conflict by replacing Jacobs with Vice Admiral Louis E. Denfeld and recalling Gingrich to Washington as Denfeld's assistant.

Promoted to rear admiral, Gingrich reported to the Bureau of Naval Personnel on October 24, 1945, where he was assigned to create the postwar structure for the Naval Reserve by the incoming chief of naval operations, Fleet Admiral Chester W. Nimitz. Gingrich was designated assistant chief of personnel (reserves) on December 7, 1945, and in August 1946 received the additional title of director of Naval Reserve. His plan for the postwar Naval Reserve was designed to mobilize the active and reserve fleets for an emergency within ten days, using 1,000,000 reservists of whom 200,000 would be drawn from an Organized Reserve and 800,000 from a Volunteer Reserve.

== Atomic Energy Commission ==
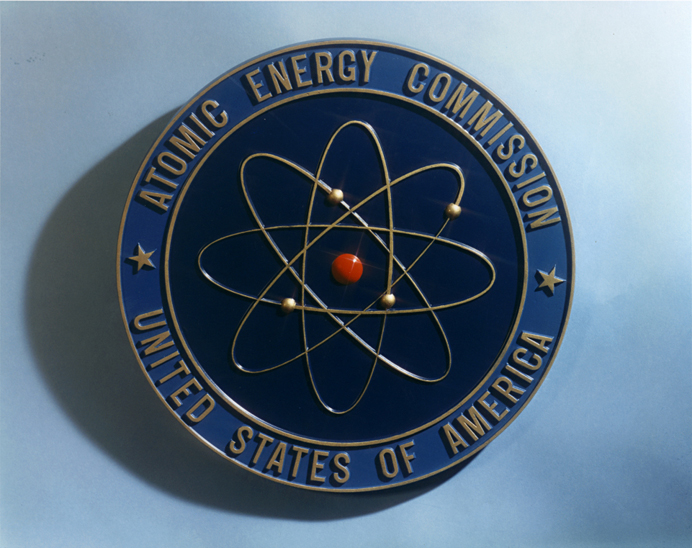
Shield of the Atomic Energy Commission.

On August 18, 1947, Gingrich was appointed the first director of the Division of Security and Intelligence at the Atomic Energy Commission (AEC). As AEC security chief, he was responsible for the physical security of AEC installations, control of classified information, development and operation of security clearance procedures, and coordination with the Central Intelligence Agency (CIA) and the Federal Bureau of Investigation (FBI). Gingrich found the job very frustrating. Shortly after leaving the position, he testified before the Joint Congressional Committee on Atomic Energy that he lacked confidence in the AEC security program, complaining that the security organization was too decentralized and its headquarters too powerless for the director to be effective.

Gingrich was an early ally of AEC commissioner and security hawk Lewis Strauss. Like Strauss, Gingrich felt that his efforts to tighten security were being unjustly blocked by irresponsibly idealistic AEC leaders. He submitted numerous written protests against the employment of individuals with questionable associations, but found his reports overruled or ignored by superiors who refused to consider political ideologies such as being an "advanced 'liberal'" as disqualifying scientists from work in the atomic energy programs, and who demanded proof of membership in the actual Communist Party for evidence of a poor security risk, not just membership in organizations deemed subversive by the Attorney General. Resentful AEC security officers believed they were being caricatured as military men without a scientific background who were jumping at ghosts by considering atomic workers unsafe if they "did not share antiquated political beliefs," a caricature perhaps grounded in incidents such as the interview of a suspended Oak Ridge National Laboratory chemist during which Gingrich "personally advised [the chemist] against the unfortunate practice of scientists acting outside their own field," and went on to disparage scientists' "attitude toward security and the fuss being raised over the Negro question."

It later emerged that Gingrich had only been hired as AEC security chief because of a lack of viable candidates. Testifying before the Joint Congressional Committee on Atomic Energy, AEC chairman David E. Lilienthal conceded that Gingrich had no relevant background in security. Asked why the FBI had not been solicited for better qualified candidates, Lilienthal said that it had been hard to find anyone willing to accept the "thorny" task. "So you selected a man who had no experience of background in this work," stated committee chairman Bourke B. Hickenlooper. "We were very pleased with the selection," Lilienthal replied, adding that Gingrich had been "a real patriot in undertaking so difficult a task when he knew other men were unwilling to undertake it."

As a high-ranking AEC official, Gingrich was occasionally called upon to explain atomic energy to the public. Addressing the Annapolis Chapter of the Military Order of the World Wars on April 19, 1949, Gingrich assured his audience that there had been no significant violation of security regulations in the past year and a half, and decried "sensational and grossly exaggerated tales" about "spies stealing atomic secrets" and about the hazards of atomic energy. "One prominent university president stated that three atomic bombs could destroy the United States. That is not true. It has been said that radioactivity will kill everyone in a city not killed by the blast of a bomb. That is not true. The effect of atomic radiation need not be fatal at all. It needs care and treatment. There is less mystery about radiation than is realized."

=== Forrestal death ===
On March 30, 1949, Chief of Naval Operations Louis E. Denfeld and Vice Chief of Naval Operations Arthur W. Radford received word that former Secretary of Defense James Forrestal was experiencing a nervous breakdown in Hobe Sound, Florida. Gingrich, who had remained close to Forrestal since serving as his wartime aide, was immediately dispatched to Forrestal's side, along with Navy psychiatrist George N. Raines. After their departure, Forrestal's friend Ferdinand Eberstadt asked the Navy not to send anyone, fearing that the arrival of too many people would overexcite Forrestal. Recalled Radford, "I assured Mr. Eberstadt that we could rely on John Gingrich to see that nothing of that kind happened but that it was too late to recall him. In fact, the Secretary seemed to trust Johnny and to be more relaxed with him present, and Dr. Raines stayed in the background. Johnny kept Admiral Denfeld and me informed of the situation." Eberstadt arrived himself on April 1, 1949 with Dr. William C. Menninger, who recommended immediate hospitalization. "Jim Forrestal flew back to Washington with Johnny Gingrich and Dr. Raines; Johnny seemed to be able to exercise more control over him than anyone else." Forrestal was admitted to Bethesda Naval Hospital for psychiatric treatment.

Radford left Washington later that month to become Commander in Chief, United States Pacific Command, and Commander in Chief, United States Pacific Fleet. Offered a position as Radford's chief of staff, Gingrich jumped at the opportunity to resume his naval career, submitting his resignation as AEC security chief on April 10, 1949, effective April 30. His letter of resignation stated that "the security division has been completely reorganized, adequately staffed with highly capable personnel whose duties have been properly set forth." Aware of Gingrich's previous discontent, Senator William E. Jenner speculated on the floor of the Senate that Gingrich had actually "quit in disgust." Asked by the press to comment, Gingrich claimed, "I resigned to accept duty as Chief of Staff in the Pacific. I was not disgruntled and I did not leave precipitately."

On May 22, 1949, Forrestal committed suicide at Bethesda Naval Hospital. As Forrestal's long-time friend, Gingrich accompanied Forrestal's casket from the Naval Hospital to Arlington National Cemetery and stood with the Forrestal family at the graveside during the official funeral on May 25, 1949. He joined the Pacific Fleet staff as Radford's chief of staff and aide in July 1949.

== Korean War ==
=== United Nations Blockade and Escort Force ===
Gingrich was designated Commander Training Command, U.S. Pacific Fleet in October 1951. On May 31, 1952, he became Commander, United Nations Blockade and Escort Force.

The Blockade and Escort Force (Task Force 95) was a subordinate command of United States Naval Forces, Far East, under the operational control of the Seventh Fleet. Ships from nine nations comprised the West Coast Blockade Group (Task Group 95.1), the East Coast Blockade Group (Task Group 95.2), the Escort Group (Task Group 95.5), the Minesweeping Group (Task Group 95.6), and the Republic of Korea Navy (Task Group 95.7). In addition to interdicting Korean waters against hostile and unauthorized shipping, Task Force 95 conducted shore bombardment and naval airstrikes on both coasts and maintained a continuous blockade of the North Korean port of Wonsan, the longest naval blockade of modern times.

Gingrich stressed efficient use of warfighting resources. When he took over Task Force 95, he discovered that his ships were firing 51,700 rounds of 5-inch ammunition per month, mostly in unobserved fire. Worried about the massive expenditure, Gingrich insisted that targets be observed to evaluate the effect of the bombardment. "I wanted to know specifically what damage was done, not that 'great damage' was done." The resulting improvement in targeting efficiency reduced the monthly firing rate to 15,000 rounds, representing a savings of approximately $40,000,000 over the course of a year. "The cost of a 5-inch shell at the end of the Korean pipeline was approximately $200," he noted, so "unless it did that much damage, we were hurting ourselves more than the enemy."

For commanding the Blockade and Escort Force, Gingrich was awarded the Distinguished Service Medal and decorations from the United Kingdom, South Korea, and Thailand. He was relieved by Rear Admiral Clarence E. Olsen on February 13, 1953.

=== Chief of Naval Material ===
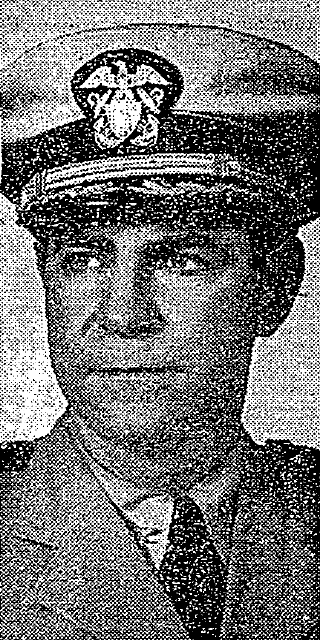
As Chief of Naval Material, 1954.

Promoted to vice admiral, he became deputy chief of naval operations for administration in February 1953. On August 1, 1953, he was appointed Chief of Naval Material (CNM), in which role he was responsible for all Navy procurement activities.

Gingrich believed that the worst procurement problems stemmed from faulty requirement planning. "No matter how well we place a contract, if there was no need for the material in the first place, our procurement effort and our money have been wasted. Yet an inordinate amount of our procurement effort has been wasted in buying unneeded material and equipment."

"Placing a price tag and a material expenditure tag on the bullets we fire may represent a somewhat new concept in our modern thinking," he concluded, "but success in future wars depends greatly upon the economy measures we utilize."

== Personal life ==
He retired from the Navy on October 1, 1954, as a full admiral, having been automatically advanced one grade on the retired list on the basis of combat citations. One month later, he was elected a vice president of the International Telephone and Telegraph Corporation (I.T.&T.). In February 1957, as part of a corporate reorganization, he was appointed president of the Federal Telephone and Radio Company, an I.T.&T. division which produced electronic equipment and components for government, military, and commercial use. He eventually returned to the parent corporation, serving as an I.T.&T. vice president until his death. He died at his home in New York City at the age of 63, after a long illness, and was buried in Arlington National Cemetery.

He married Florence Benson in 1925 and they had one son, John Edward, Jr. He remarried to Vanetta Oliphant on July 3, 1939, and they had one daughter, Susan Alice.

His decorations include the Distinguished Service Medal, awarded for commanding the Blockade and Escort Force; the Silver Star, awarded for assisting the damaged aircraft carrier Franklin; two awards of the Legion of Merit for commanding the cruiser Pittsburgh; and decorations from the United Kingdom, South Korea, and Thailand.
