= Sara A. Joyner =

United States Navy admiral

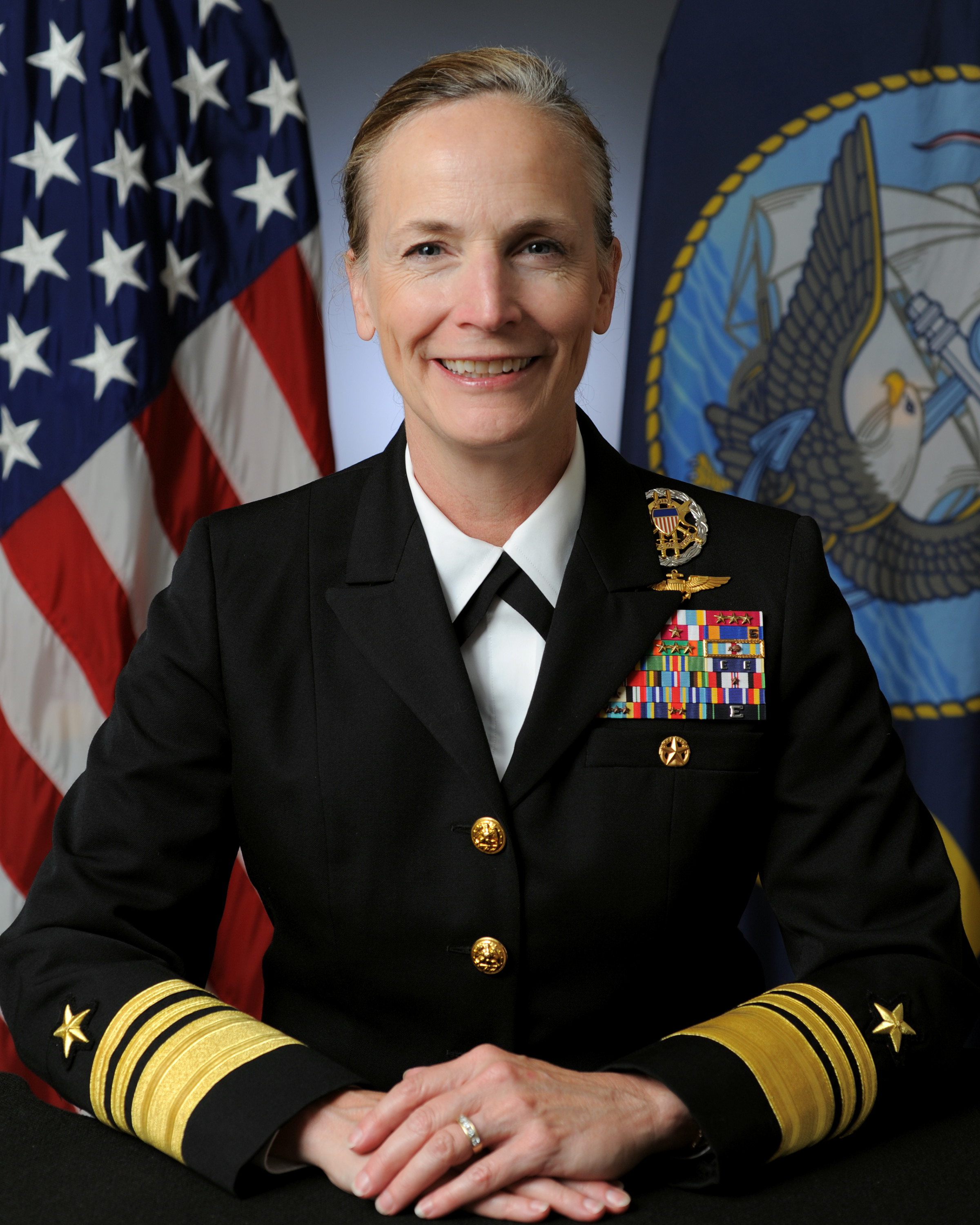
- Born: Sara Annette Applegarth; 1967 (age 58–59); Hoopers Island, Maryland, US
- Military career
- Allegiance: United States
- Branch: United States Navy
- Service years: 1989–2025
- Rank: Vice Admiral
- Nickname: Clutch
- Commands: Carrier Strike Group 2; Carrier Air Wing Three; Strike Fighter Squadron 105
- Conflicts: War in Afghanistan; Iraq War
- Awards: Navy Distinguished Service Medal; Defense Superior Service Medal; Legion of Merit (4)
- Sara A. Joyner's voice Joyner responds to questions at a Senate Appropriations Defense Subcommittee hearing on the 2023 Chinese balloon incident Recorded 9 February 2023

Sara Annette Joyner (born 1967) is a retired United States Navy officer. She is the first female strike fighter pilot to command a United States Navy fighter squadron and a carrier air wing. Her promotion to rear admiral (lower half) was authorized by the United States Senate on 25 May 2017. On 24 February, the Secretary of Defense announced that Joyner would be promoted to the rank of rear admiral; she was pinned on 1 April 2021. She was promoted to vice admiral on 3 June 2022.

== Early life and education ==
Sara Annette Applegarth was born on Hoopers Island in Maryland. She is one of four children of Samuel Hubert Applegarth Jr. and Sara Jane (McClaran) Applegarth. Her father, Commander Hubert Applegarth, retired from active duty in the United States Navy in 1977, having graduated from the United States Naval Academy in 1951. The family property in the village of Honga on Upper Hoopers Island was purchased by Sara's great-grandfather William Francis Applegarth Sr. in 1891. Her great-grandfather later served as a member of the Maryland House of Delegates and the Maryland Senate.

Applegarth also attended the United States Naval Academy. She graduated with a Bachelor of Science in Oceanography in 1989 and was commissioned as an ensign. She then attended flight school and earned her naval aviator wings in July 1991.

== Career ==
Sara Joyner became a fighter pilot in 1996, flying an F/A-18 Hornet with VFA-147. She assumed command of Strike Fighter Squadron 105 from Commander Douglas C. Verissimo on 2 March 2007. She turned over command to Commander Thomas R. Tennant on 9 June 2008.

Joyner later became deputy commander of Carrier Air Wing Three, assuming full command from Captain Michael S. Wallace on 4 January 2013. The air wing embarked on a deployment aboard USS Harry S. Truman on 22 July 2013. She commanded the air wing until relieved by Captain George Wikoff on 22 December 2013.

In June 2018, Joyner became Director for Manpower and Personnel, J1 for the Joint Chiefs of Staff. In August 2019, she assumed command of Carrier Strike Group 2. Joyner was succeeded by Rear Admiral Richard J. Cheeseman at the end of April 2020. Joyner served as chief of legislative affairs for the Department of the Navy until May 2022.

In April 2022, Joyner was nominated for promotion to vice admiral and assignment as director for force structure, resources and assessment of the Joint Staff (J8). She was promoted on 3 June 2022.

Based on Joyner's having run a team that conducted classified war games and assessed new weapon systems, Gen. Dan Caine, chairman of the Joint Chiefs of Staff to whom Joyner reported, wanted her to be promoted to a high-profile Pentagon position. In 2025 Caine urged Defense Secretary Pete Hegseth to nominate her. Hegseth, who has objected to promotions he considers to be "diversity hire[s]," denied the promotion, because he was troubled by Joyner's having spoken at events to encourage female aviators and submariners, and her appearance in a Navy recruiting ad as the first woman to command a carrier air wing. Caine also asked John Phelan, then the Secretary of the Navy to try to persuade Hegseth, but Hegseth was not convinced. Joyner retired in the fall of 2025, as expected of senior officers who are not promoted.

== Personal ==
Joyner is married to James Mitchell Joyner IV, her Naval Academy classmate and fellow naval aviator. They were married on 19 February 1992 in Cameron County, Texas, and have two children. Her husband Commander James Joyner retired from active duty in the navy in 2014.

Military offices
Preceded by Kyle Kremer	Director for Manpower and Personnel of the Joint Staff; 2018–2019	Succeeded by Lenny J. Richoux
Preceded by Stephen C. Evans	Commander of Carrier Strike Group 2; 2019–2020	Succeeded by Richard J. Cheeseman Jr.
Preceded by Charles B. Cooper II	Chief of Legislative Affairs of the United States Navy; 2020–2022	Succeeded by Leonard C. Dollaga
Preceded by Ronald A. Boxall	Director for Force Structure, Resources, and Assessment of the Joint Staff; 2022–2025	Succeeded by Steven P. Whitney
