= Alfred J. Whittle Jr. =

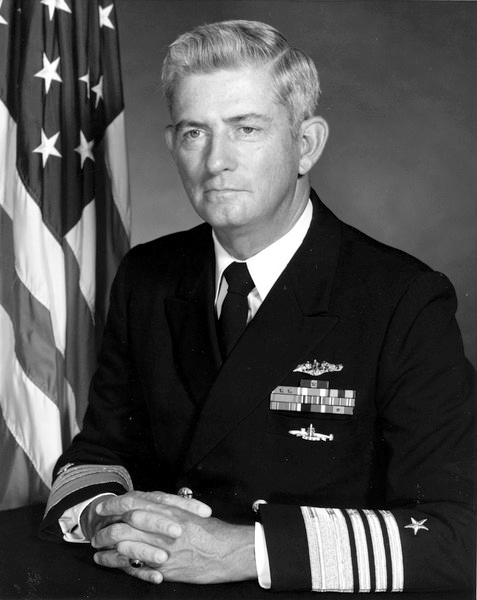
- Born: February 23, 1924; Mount Vernon, New York, U.S.
- Died: May 18, 1993 (aged 69); Arlington, Virginia, U.S.
- Military career
- Allegiance: United States
- Branch: United States Navy
- Service years: 1945–1981
- Rank: Admiral
- Commands: Office of Naval Material

Alfred James Whittle Jr. (February 23, 1924 – May 18, 1993) was an admiral in the United States Navy.

Whittle graduated from the United States Naval Academy in June 1945. His first assignment was on USS Harry E. Hubbard (DD-748). Transitioning to submarines, he commanded USS Sterlet (SS-392), USS Seawolf (SSN-575) and USS Andrew Jackson (SSBN-619). He was Chief of Naval Material from 1978 to 1981. Awards and decorations he received include the Navy Distinguished Service Medal, Legion of Merit and Meritorious Service Medal.

He died of cancer in 1993.
