= Dennis Velez =

US Navy admiral

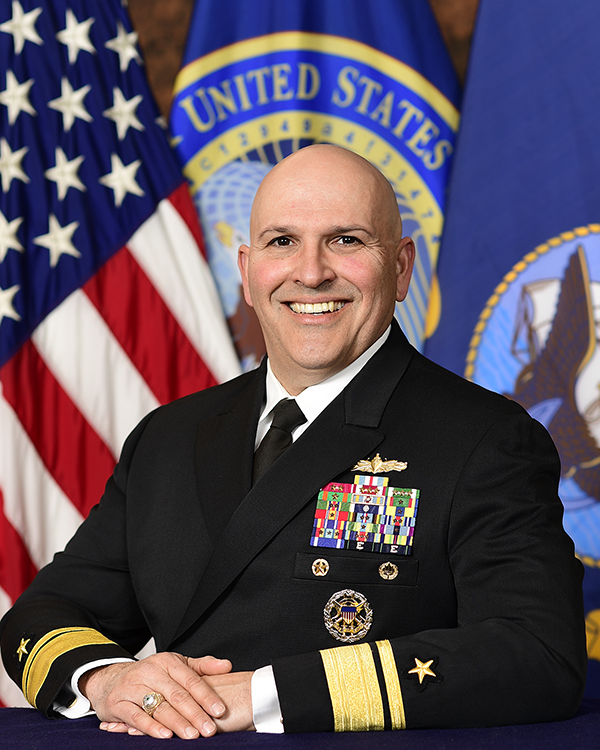
- Official portrait, 2024
- Born: Ponce, Puerto Rico
- Education: United States Naval Academy (BS); Touro College (MS)
- Military career
- Allegiance: United States
- Branch: United States Navy
- Service years: 1992–present
- Rank: Rear Admiral
- Commands: Carrier Strike Group 10; Navy Recruiting Command; USS San Jacinto (CG-56); USS Fitzgerald (DDG-62)
- Awards: Defense Superior Service Medal; Legion of Merit (2)

Dennis Velez is a United States Navy rear admiral and surface warfare officer who serves as the chief of staff of the United States Cyber Command. He previously served as the director of plans and policy of United States Cyber Command from June 2023 to June 2024.

Born in Ponce, Puerto Rico and raised in Adjuntas, Puerto Rico, Velez graduated from the United States Naval Academy in 1992 with a Bachelor of Science in Aerospace Engineering. He earned a master's degree in Information Technology Management. Also has a Master of Science in Management Information Systems from Touro College.

In 2021 Dennis Velez was inducted to the Puerto Rico Veterans Hall of Fame.

== Military career ==
Velez most recently served as the commander of Carrier Strike Group 10 from April 2022 to May 2023. He previously served as the commander of Navy Recruiting Command from April 2020 to March 2022, and as the senior military assistant to the 76th United States Secretary of the Navy Richard V. Spencer, with tours as commanding officer of the USS San Jacinto (CG-56) and USS Fitzgerald (DDG-62).

In February 2023, Velez was nominated for promotion to rear admiral.

== Military decorations and awards ==
Among Rear Admiral Velez's military decorations are the following:

Surface Warfare Officer Insignia
1st Row	Defense Superior Service Medal	Legion of Merit w/ two gold stars	Meritorious Service Medal w/ three gold stars
2nd Row	Navy and Marine Corps Commendation Medal w/ three gold stars	Navy and Marine Corps Achievement Medal w/ one gold star	Joint Meritorious Unit Award w/ one bronze Oak Leaf Cluster
3rd Row	Navy Achievement Medal	Navy Meritorious Unit Commendation	Navy "E" Ribbon w/ Wreathed Battle E device
4th Row	Navy Expeditionary Medal w/ one bronze service star	National Defense Service Medal w/ one bronze service star	Armed Forces Expeditionary Medal
5th Row	Global War on Terrorism Expeditionary Medal w/ two bronze service stars	Global War on Terrorism Service Medal	Armed Forces Service Medal
6th Row	Humanitarian Service Medal w/ one bronze star	Navy and Marine Corps Sea Service Deployment Ribbon w/ three bronze stars	Navy and Marine Corps Overseas Service Ribbon w/ three bronze stars
7th Row	NATO Medal	Navy Rifleman Marksmanship Ribbon with Expert Device	Navy Pistol Marksmanship Ribbon with Expert Device
Command at Sea insignia
Office of the Joint Chiefs of Staff Identification Badge

Military offices
Preceded by Brendan McLane	Commander of Navy Recruiting Command; 2020–2022	Succeeded by Alexis T. Walker
Preceded by Richard Cheeseman	Commander of Carrier Strike Group 10; 2022–2023	Succeeded by Robert Westendorff
Preceded by Heidi Berg	Director of Plans and Policy of the United States Cyber Command; 2023–2024	Succeeded by Kevin P. Lenox
Preceded by Bradley L. Plyburn	Chief of Staff of the United States Cyber Command; 2024–present	Incumbent
