= Frederick H. Michaelis =

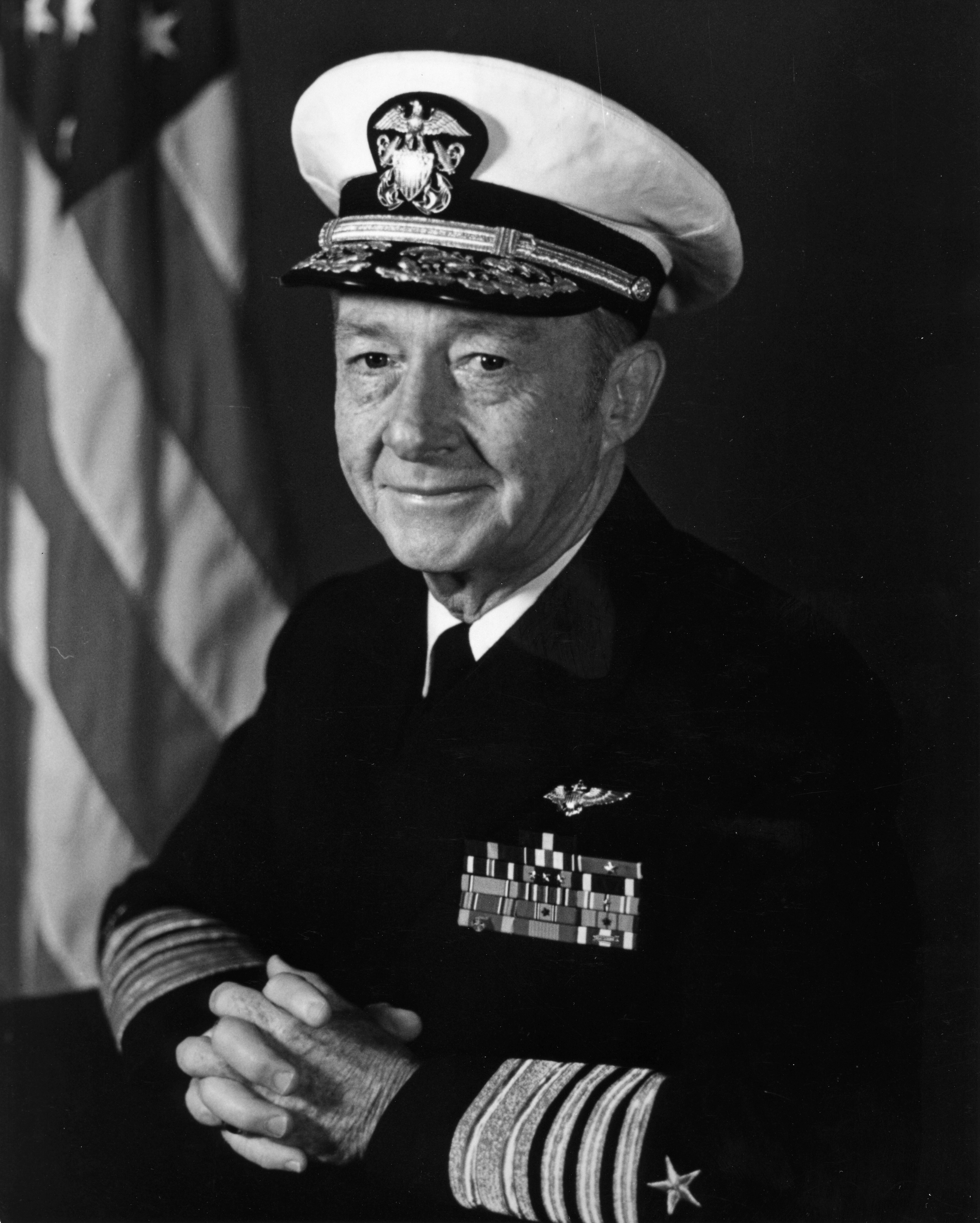
- Official portrait of Admiral Frederick H. Michaelis, June 1975
- Born: March 4, 1917; Kansas City, Missouri, U.S.
- Died: August 13, 1992 (aged 75); Arlington, Virginia, U.S.
- Burial place: Arlington National Cemetery
- Military career
- Allegiance: United States of America
- Branch: United States Navy
- Service years: 1936–1978
- Rank: Admiral
- Commands: Attack Squadron 12; USS Tolovana; USS Enterprise; Naval Air Force Atlantic; Office of Naval Material
- Conflicts: World War II; Cold War; Vietnam War
- Awards: Navy Cross; Navy Distinguished Service Medal (2); Silver Star; Distinguished Flying Cross; Legion of Merit (2); Air Medal (4)

Frederick Hayes Michaelis (March 4, 1917 – August 13, 1992) was an admiral in the United States Navy who served in World War II, the Korean War, and the Vietnam War.

== Personal life ==
Michaelis was born on March 4, 1917, in Kansas City, Missouri. He married Rose Schiche of Lake Geneva, Wisconsin, with whom he had three children. Michaelis died on August 13, 1992, in Washington, D.C., and is buried with his wife at Arlington National Cemetery.

== Career ==
Michaelis graduated from the United States Naval Academy in 1940 as an ensign and was assigned to the USS Pennsylvania. After surviving the attack on Pearl Harbor, he became a Naval Aviator. Later in World War II, he was assigned to what would become Attack Squadron 12, which he eventually commanded in 1945. Following the war, he was involved in the development of nuclear weapons and was assigned to the USS Hornet. Later, he served on the staff of the Commander, Naval Air Forces (1955–1956), and with the Assistant Secretary of the Navy (AIR) (1956–1957). He was Executive Officer of the USS Randolph (1957–1959), before being given the command of the USS Tolovana in 1959. Following this, he worked with the Chief of Naval Operations (1959–1960) and became the second Commanding Officer of the USS Enterprise, the world's first nuclear-powered aircraft carrier (1963–1965), during the Vietnam War. He was promoted to rear admiral in 1965 and vice admiral in 1969. Later he served as Commander, Naval Air Force U.S. Atlantic Fleet (1972–1975), and Chief of the Office of Naval Material (1975–1978), being promoted to four-star admiral in 1975. He retired in 1978.

== Awards and honors ==
Awards he received include the Navy Cross.

Naval Aviator Badge
Navy Cross
Navy Distinguished Service Medal w/ 5/16" gold star	Silver Star	Legion of Merit w/ 5/16" gold star
Distinguished Flying Cross	Air Medal w/ three 5/16" gold stars	Navy and Marine Commendation Medal
American Defense Service Medal	American Campaign Medal	Asiatic-Pacific Campaign Medal w/ 3/16" silver star
World War II Victory Medal	National Defense Service Medal w/ 3/16" bronze star	Vietnam Service Medal w/ 3/16" bronze star
Officer of the National Order of Vietnam	Vietnam Gallantry Cross	Vietnam Campaign Medal

=== Navy Cross citation ===

Lieutenant Commander Frederick Hayes Michaelis
U.S. Navy
Date Of Action: April 17, 1945

The President of the United States of America takes pleasure in presenting the Navy Cross to Lieutenant Commander Frederick Hayes Michaelis (NSN: 0-85187), United States Navy, for extraordinary heroism in operations against the enemy while serving as Pilot of a carrier-based Navy Fighter Plane and Commanding Officer of Fighting Squadron TWELVE (VF-12), attached to the USS Hornet (CV-12), in action on 17 April 1945, in the vicinity of Okinawa Jima. When the Combat Air Patrol, of which he was the leader, encountered a much larger group of enemy fighters, Lieutenant Commander Michaelis pressed home determined and vigorous attacks which destroyed nearly all of the enemy aircraft with no loss to his own group, and thereby prevented attacks on our surface forces. He personally shot down three enemy fighters, the last of which he attacked and destroyed with only one gun functioning. Just prior to this encounter, he effectively strafed enemy airfield installations and destroyed one aircraft on the ground. His courage, inspiring leadership and professional skill were at all times in keeping with the highest traditions of the United States Naval Service.

== See also ==
- List of United States Navy four-star admirals
- List of USS Enterprise (CVN-65) commanding officers
