= Jeffrey Trussler =

U.S. Navy admiral

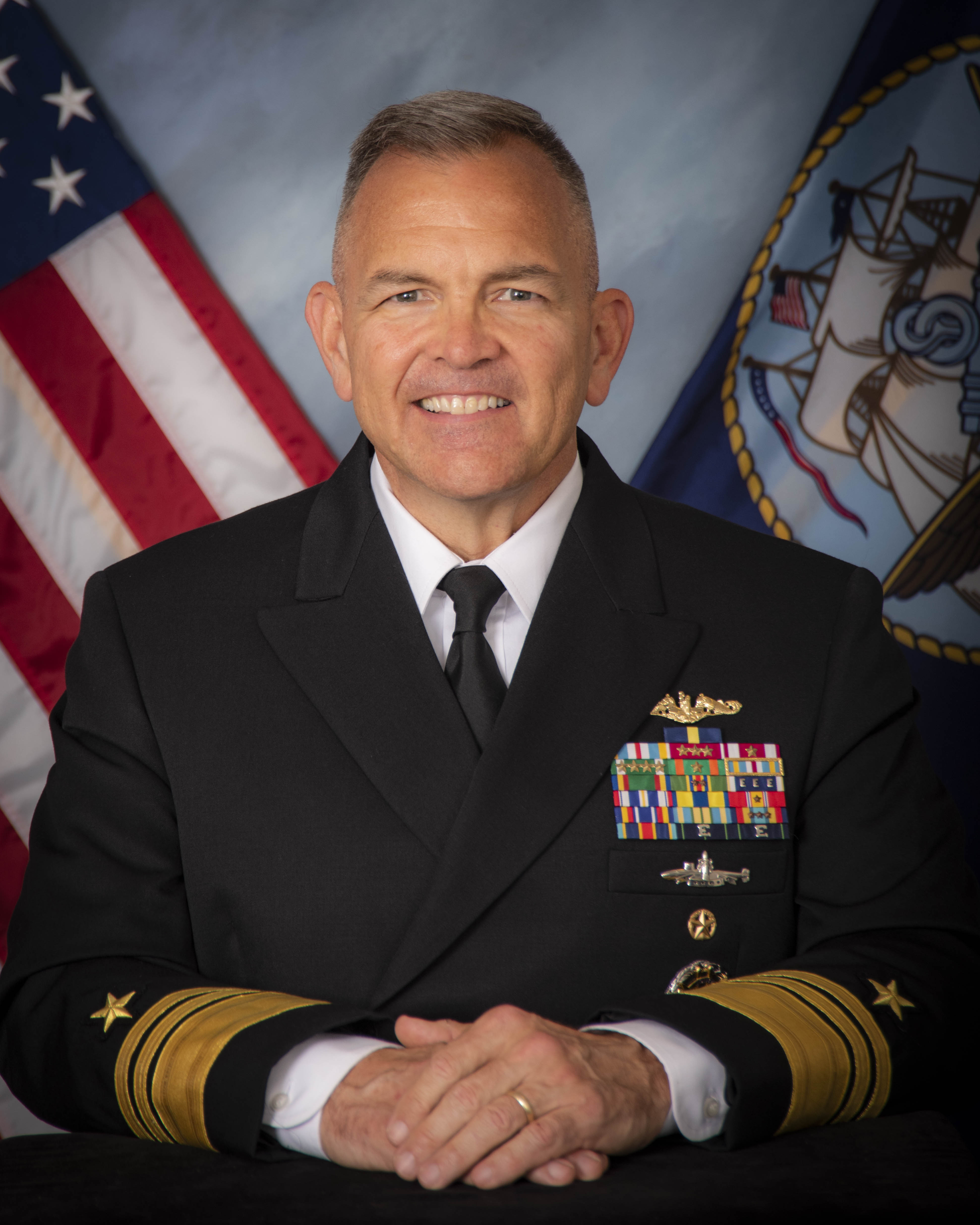
- Born: 1963 (age 62–63); Oklahoma, U.S.
- Military career
- Allegiance: United States
- Branch: United States Navy
- Service years: 1985–2023
- Rank: Vice Admiral
- Commands: Director of Naval Intelligence; Undersea Warfighting Development Center; Task Force 69; USS Maryland (SSBN-738)
- Awards: Navy Distinguished Service Medal; Defense Superior Service Medal; Legion of Merit (4)

Jeffrey Eugene Trussler (born 1963) is a retired United States Navy vice admiral who last served as Deputy Chief of Naval Operations for Information Warfare and Director of Naval Intelligence from June 5, 2020 to August 2023. As the DCNO for Information Warfare, Trussler is the principal advisor to the Chief of Naval Operations regarding information, command and control, networks, cybersecurity, intelligence, electronic warfare, battlespace awareness and precision navigation. He previously served as the Director of Future Plans of the United States Navy. Trussler is a member of the Cherokee Nation who was raised in Oklahoma. He graduated from Miami High School (in 1981) and Northeastern Oklahoma A&M Junior College. Trussler earned a B.S. degree in mechanical engineering from Oklahoma State University in 1985 and later received an M.A. degree in managerial economics from the University of Oklahoma in 1992.

Military offices
New office	Commander of the Undersea Warfighting Development Center; 2015–2016	Succeeded by James E. Pitts
Preceded by Matthew J. Kohler	Deputy Chief of Naval Operations for Information Warfare and Director of Naval Intelligence of the United States Navy; 2020–2023	Succeeded by Scott W. Bray; Acting
