= Steven A. White =

United States Navy admiral (1928–2021)

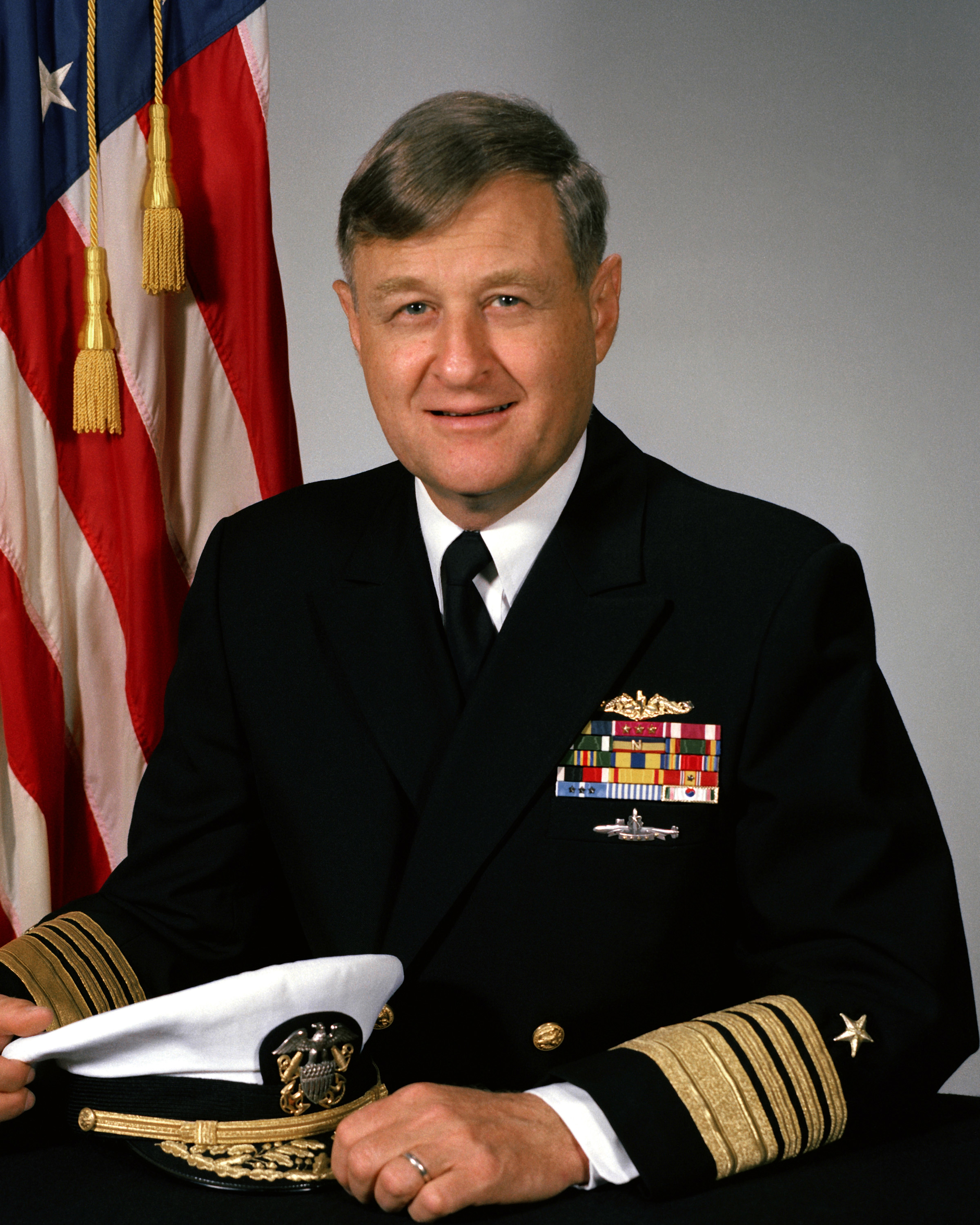
- Born: September 18, 1928; Los Angeles, California, U.S.
- Died: February 1, 2021 (aged 92); Charlottesville, Virginia, U.S.
- Spouse: Mary Anne Landreau
- Military career
- Allegiance: United States
- Branch: United States Navy
- Service years: 1952-1985
- Rank: Admiral
- Commands: Chief of Naval Material
- Conflicts: Korean War
- Awards: Navy Distinguished Service Medal; Legion of Merit (4); Meritorious Service Medal; Navy Commendation Medal; Presidential Unit Citation
- Other work: Manager of nuclear power, TVA

Steven Angelo White (September 18, 1928 – February 1, 2021) was a four-star admiral who served in the United States Navy from 1948 until 1985. He was the 19th and last Chief of Naval Material.

== Background ==
Steven ("Steve") Angelo White was born on September 18, 1928, in Los Angeles, California. The third of four children to Croatian immigrant and retired Los Angeles policeman Steven George White (formerly Stojan Sutalo) (c. 1888 - 1951) and wife Helen (née Blanchard), he grew up primarily in Tujunga, California. After early graduation from Verdugo Hills High School in January 1946, White received a scholarship to Occidental College (with the personal recommendation of the Vice President of Verdugo Hills). He left Occidental in early 1948 and, after a brief working hiatus from academia, transferred with a full Naval ROTC scholarship to the University of Southern California (USC) to complete his education.

== Naval career ==
After several failed attempts to enlist during World War II (owing to his age), White joined the United States Navy Reserve as an enlisted seaman recruit in 1948. Through an ROTC scholarship to USC, he commenced his career as an officer. While at USC, he pursued his Bachelor of Arts in international relations, while simultaneously pursuing his master's degree in political science. He began work as well on a law degree (though, as his military career progressed and his family life developed apace, he did not complete this degree).

During his time at USC, he served on three midshipmen cruises: to Panama on the light cruiser Toledo in the summer of 1949; for amphibious warfare training in Little Creek, Virginia, and Naval aviation training at Pensacola, Florida, in the summer of 1950; and to Cuba on the battleship Missouri from Norfolk, Virginia, in the summer of 1951 (his senior cruise). Following his graduation from USC in the summer of 1952, he was commissioned as an ensign.

White's first assignment as a commissioned officer was USS Manchester (CL-83), a cruiser based out of Long Beach, California. Aboard Manchester, White participated in the Korean War: Manchester served on the bomb-line off the east coast of Korea before he joined the ship in 1952, and returned to the bomb-line, with periodic trips to patrol and shell Wonsan, until the signing of the armistice on July 27, 1953.

Following White's application and acceptance to the submarine program, as well as his promotion to lieutenant (junior grade) in December 1953, the Whites relocated to New London, Connecticut, for a six-month training course. At the conclusion of the course, he received orders to USS Tang (SS-563), then stationed at Pearl Harbor. He served aboard Tang for two years, including lengthy service in and around Japan. In 1956, when he was seriously considering resigning from the Navy and a return to his law school ambitions, he first encountered Admiral Hyman G. Rickover, whose nuclear program was then on the brink of blossoming.

White's first encounter with the "Father of the Nuclear Navy"—which consisted of attendance to a lecture given by Rickover in Pearl Harbor in 1956—inspired him to apply for one of the very few openings in Rickover's program. He survived the grueling interview process and was accepted, once again relocating his family to New London to attend the Naval Nuclear Power School in the Naval Submarine Base from June 1956 through December 1956. Following graduation, the Whites moved to Idaho so he could continue his training until May 1957—this time serving at the nuclear prototype reactor in Arco, Idaho.

His first assignment post-training was the USS Nautilus (SSN-571), Rickover's first nuclear submarine. He served on Nautilus from May 1957 to the mid-1960. From September 1957 through May 1958, Nautilus made her first attempt to break into the "no man's land" of the far Arctic. A first foray—part of a training rendezvous with the diesel sub USS Trigger (SS-564) at the southern end of the icepack, to be followed by participation in Operation Strikeback, a series of NATO exercises in the North Atlantic—demonstrated to both officers and crew the intensity of the challenge posed by the comparatively uncharted and unpredictable waters under the icepack. Their initial attempt to make a "run" for the Pole during their training with Trigger in early September was unsuccessful, owing to the unpredicted intensity of underwater ice.

After the Russians launched the rocket Sputnik I (carrying the first man-made earth satellite) on October 4, and Sputnik II on November 3, as well as the United States' failed attempt to launch the Vanguard TV3 rocket satellite on December 6, the desire for comparable technological achievement intensified, particularly under the administration of President Eisenhower. Nautilus successfully completed a transpolar crossing during Operation Sunshine, conducted from June through August 1958, piercing the pole on August 3, at 23:15 Eastern Daylight Saving Time. This achievement was announced by the TOP SECRET OP-IMMED message: "Nautilus Ninety North", transmitted on August 5.

In the months that followed the PANOPO (Pacific to Atlantic via NOrth POle) crossing and until Nautilus entered the Portsmouth, New Hampshire, shipyard for her first overhaul in April 1959, White and the other officers served as public relations representatives for Nautilus and nuclear power.

In January 1960, before completion of the overhaul, White received orders to Westinghouse's Bettis Atomic Power Laboratory in West Mifflin, Pennsylvania for six weeks of school, thenceforth to serve as Engineer of USS Ethan Allen (SSBN-608), named for a Vermont Revolutionary War hero, then under construction by Electric Boat. Shipyard work concluded, Ethan Allen was selected for the live Christmas Island shot—the only complete missile test with an armed warhead ever ordered—in July 1961.

Soon after, White was promoted to Executive Officer of the same ship on which he had served for two years as Engineer. Training followed at the Fleet Combat Training Center Atlantic (FTC) in Dam Neck, Virginia Beach. Aboard Ethan Allen, he and his fellow officers and crew experienced first-hand the 1962 tensions of the Cuban Missile Crisis.

In the summer of 1964, White received his first shore-duty assignment: to the staff of the Deputy to the Submarine Force Commander Atlantic (SUBLANT). During this time, he unilaterally developed a training program and personal examinations for nuclear submarines.

In the summer of 1966, his next assignment, as commanding officer of USS Pargo (SSN-650) (then under construction by Electric Boat in Groton, Connecticut), necessitated several weeks of training at Rickover's CHARM school in Washington, D.C. (during which time Rickover utilized him more as a direct staff-member than allowed time for actual training). Command of Pargo entailed, among other experiences, training and target practice with the Mark 48 torpedo, as well as more under-ice and Arctic explorations.

By the summer of 1969, the Whites were established members of the Groton, Connecticut submarine community. Consequently, his orders to serve as Commander of Division 102, supervising four submarines, brought comparative stability to the oft-moving family. This work was followed by relocation to Washington, D.C., in October 1970, where he served for nearly two years, working directly for Admiral Rickover at Naval Reactors. It was then that he received the prize billet of Commander of the Navy's second Fleet Ballistic Missile (FBM) Submarine Squadron in Rota, Spain, which concluded with his promotion to rear admiral and assignment as commander of Submarine Group Two, based in Groton.

During his next assignment, under Admiral Michaelis in the Office of Naval Material (NAVMAT) beginning the summer of 1976, White worked to revitalize and reform the branch and establish a group of all material personnel in all of the large organizations through the military structure, coordinating them to function more seamlessly under Michaelis' command. This assignment was followed, in the summer of 1978, with orders to serve under the Deputy Chief of Naval Operations (OP-02), in charge of Submarine Warfare. In May 1980, White was promoted to vice admiral and assigned to serve as COMSUBLANT.

During his COMSUBLANT tenure, he created the Tactical Readiness Evaluation program, reconstructed war plans for interactions with the Soviet Union at a critical moment (taking into consideration their bastions for ballistic submarines), and transformed the program for negotiating the pace of operation and calculating "home port" time for officers and crew (converting OPTEMPO to PERSTEMPO). In May 1983, he received his final assignment in the United States Navy: promotion to full four-star admiral and return to NAVMAT, this time as Chief. He aggressively pursued (and enforced) fiscal responsibility and reform as Chief of NAVMAT.

== Manager of nuclear power, Tennessee Valley Authority ==
Following his retirement from the Navy in July 1985, White worked as a part-time contractor and adviser for various companies (with the codicil that he refused ever to work on anything that might produce a conflict of interest with his military service). Later that year, he took charge of the nuclear power division of the Tennessee Valley Authority (TVA). In the three years he worked for the TVA, he successfully cleaned out pervasive personnel problems, revitalized the deeply conflicted program, and laid the ground work for the resumption of nuclear power supply: TVA's Sequoyah PWR Unit 1 resumed full functionality on November 10, 1988. At the same time, he successfully combatted political questions, allegations that he had broken conflict of interest laws, death threats, and being the target of negative press. All charges were completely dismissed. He retired from the TVA in November 1988. For a short time after leaving the TVA, White worked once again as a contractor for Lockheed Martin Corporation and Ebasco Services.

== Retirement and death ==
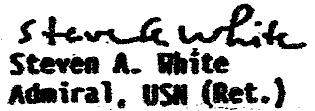
Adm. White's signature from 1991 letter to the president, requesting a review of the findings against US officers at Pearl Harbor

In 2004, he joined 120 other retired US flag officers in signing an open letter that condemned John Kerry's vote against a funding bill for US troops in Afghanistan and Iraq. He appeared at the 2004 Republican National Convention to endorse the reelection of President George Bush. He did not endorse McCain in the 2008 election. White died on February 1, 2021, in Charlottesville, Virginia, at the age of 92.
