= Leonard Dollaga =

U.S. Navy admiral

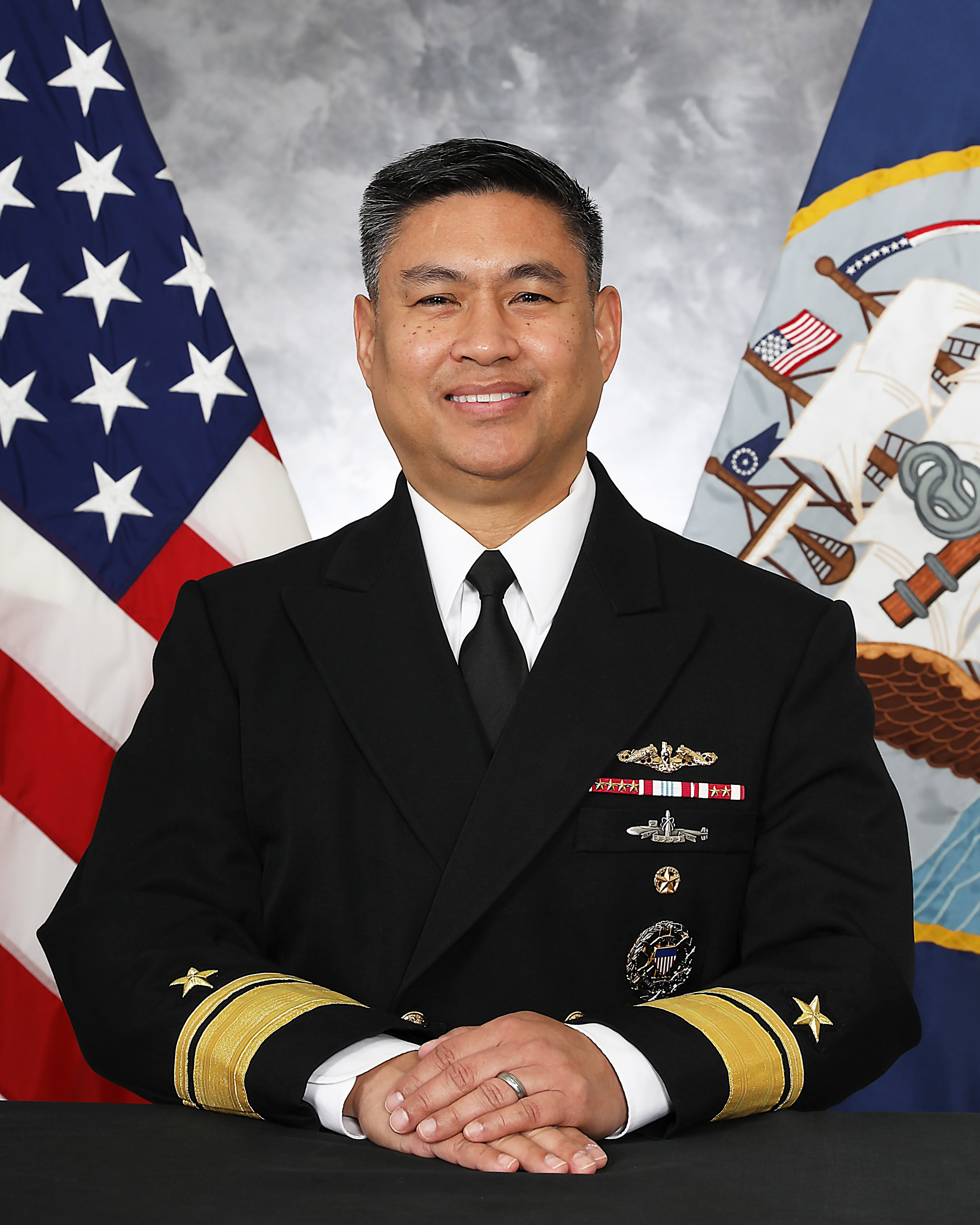
- Official portrait, 2021
- Born: 1968 (age 57–58); Vallejo, California, U.S.
- Military career
- Allegiance: United States
- Branch: United States Navy
- Service years: 1990–2024
- Rank: Rear Admiral
- Nickname: Butch
- Commands: Chief of Legislative Affairs; Submarine Group 7 Undersea Warfighting Development Center; Submarine Development Squadron 12; USS Charlotte (SSN-766)
- Awards: Legion of Merit (5)

Leonard Cy Dollaga (born 1968) is a retired United States Navy rear admiral who last served as the Chief of Legislative Affairs from 2022 to 2024. He most recently served as the Commander of Submarine Group 7, Task Force 74, and Task Force 54 from 2020 to 2022. He was previously the commander of the Undersea Warfighting Development Center from 2018 to 2020.

Raised in Vallejo, California, Dollaga is a 1990 graduate of the United States Naval Academy with a Bachelor of Science degree in mechanical engineering. He later earned a master's degree in engineering management from George Washington University.

Military offices
Preceded by James E. Pitts	Commander of the Undersea Warfighting Development Center; 2018–2020	Succeeded by Richard Seif
Preceded by James E. Pitts	Commander of Submarine Group 7, Task Force 74, and Task Force 54; 2020–2022	Succeeded by Richard Seif
Preceded by Sara A. Joyner	Chief of Legislative Affairs of the United States Navy; 2022–2024	Succeeded by Marc J. Miguez
