= James E. Pitts =

U.S. Navy admiral (born 1964)

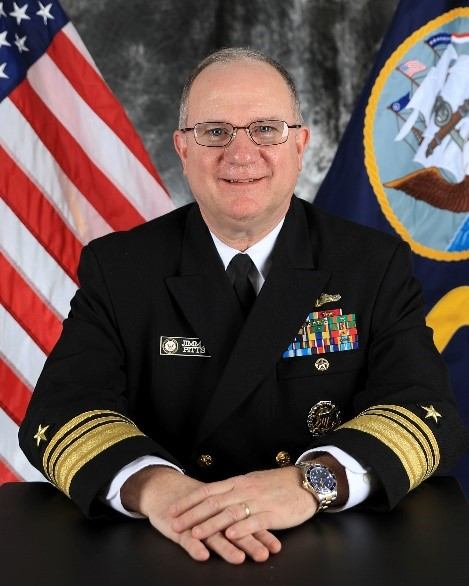
- Official portrait, 2024
- Born: 1964 (age 61–62)
- Military career
- Allegiance: United States
- Branch: United States Navy
- Service years: 1986–2026
- Rank: Vice Admiral
- Commands: Submarine Group 7 Undersea Warfighting Development Center; Submarine Squadron 7 USS Tucson
- Awards: Defense Superior Service Medal; Legion of Merit (3)

James Edward Pitts (born 1964) is a retired United States Navy vice admiral who has served as the deputy chief of naval operations for warfighting requirements and capabilities from December 2023 to 2026. He most recently served as the Director of Warfare Integration from 2020 to 2023. Previously, he served as the commander of Submarine Group 7.

Raised in Milton, Florida, Pitts graduated from the United States Naval Academy in 1986 with a Bachelor of Science degree in mechanical engineering. He later earned a Master of Arts degree in national security affairs from the Naval Postgraduate School in December 1992. His master's thesis was entitled Theater Ballistic Missile Defenses: An Emerging Role for the Navy?.

In April 2023, Pitts was nominated for promotion to vice admiral and assignment as deputy chief of naval operations for warfighting requirements and capabilities.

Military offices
| Preceded by Jeffrey Trussler | Commander of the Undersea Warfighting Development Center; 2016–2018 | Succeeded by Leonard C. Dollaga |
| Preceded by Richard A. Correll | Commander of Submarine Group 7; 2018–2020 | Succeeded by Leonard C. Dollaga |
| Preceded by James W. Kilby | Director of Warfare Integration of the United States Navy; 2020–2023 | Succeeded by Paul J. Schlise |
| Preceded by Christopher A. Miller; Acting | Deputy Chief of Naval Operations for Warfighting Requirements and Capabilities of the United States Navy; 2023–2026 | Succeeded by Michael S. Wosje |
