= USS Pittsburgh (CA-72) =

United States Navy heavy cruiser

Coordinates: 40.4446982°N 79.9561294°W

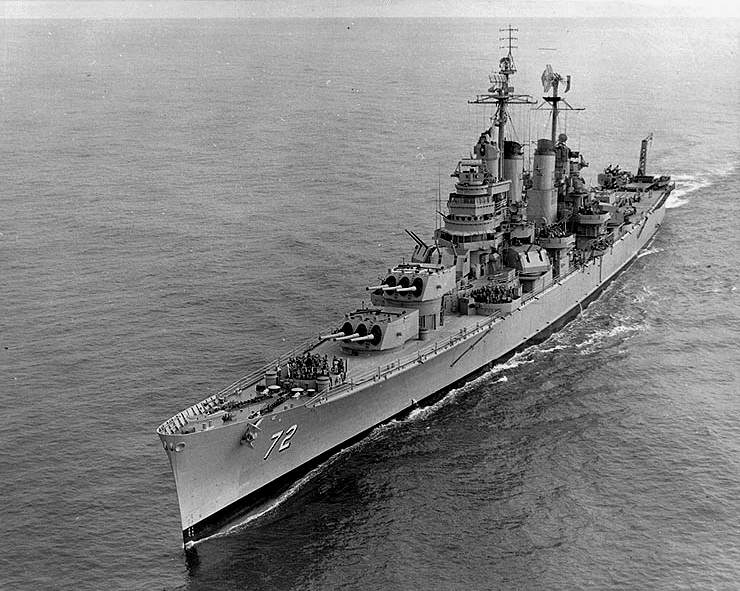
- USS Pittsburgh on 11 October 1955

History

United States
- Name: Pittsburgh
- Namesake: City of Pittsburgh, Pennsylvania
- Builder: Bethlehem Shipbuilding Corporation's Fore River Shipyard, Quincy, Massachusetts
- Laid down: 3 February 1943
- Launched: 22 February 1944
- Commissioned: 10 October 1944
- Decommissioned: 7 March 1947
- Recommissioned: 25 September 1951
- Decommissioned: 28 August 1956
- Stricken: 1 July 1973
- Identification: Callsign: NBXP; Hull number: CA-72
- Honors and awards: See Awards
- Fate: Scrapped, 1 August 1974
- Notes: Bell is in Pittsburgh

General characteristics
- Class & type: Baltimore-class cruiser
- Displacement: 13,600 long tons (13,818 t)
- Length: 673 ft 5 in (205.26 m)
- Beam: 70 ft 10 in (21.59 m)
- Draft: 20 ft 6 in (6.25 m)
- Speed: 33 knots (61 km/h; 38 mph)
- Complement: 1,142 officers and enlisted
- Armament: 9 × 8 in (203 mm)/55 cal guns; 12 × 5 in (127 mm)/38 cal guns; 48 × Bofors 40 mm guns; 22 × Oerlikon 20 mm cannons
- Aircraft carried: 4

USS Pittsburgh (CA-72), originally named USS Albany (CA-72), was a Baltimore-class heavy cruiser of the US Navy and the third ship to bear the name. She was laid down on 3 February 1943 by the Bethlehem Shipbuilding Corporation's Fore River Shipyard at Quincy, Massachusetts, launched on 22 February 1944, sponsored by Mrs. Cornelius D. Scully, wife of the Mayor of Pittsburgh and commissioned in Boston, Massachusetts on 10 October 1944, with Capt. John Edward Gingrich in command.

== Service history ==
=== World War II, 1944–1945 ===
Pittsburgh worked up along the East Coast and in the Caribbean before departing from Boston, Massachusetts on 13 January 1945 for duty in the Pacific theatre of operations. After calling at Panama and final gunnery exercises around the Hawaiian Islands, she was assigned to Fast Carrier Task Force 58 (TF 58), built around the aircraft carrier USS Lexington, at Ulithi on 13 February.

==== Iwo Jima ====
The force sailed on 10 February for the assault on Iwo Jima, conducting carrier airstrikes against airfields near Tokyo on 16 and 17 February which restricted the Japanese air response to the initial landings on 19 February. Further strikes against Tokyo on 25 February and Ryukyu Islands on 1 March complemented these actions.

The task force sailed from Ulithi on 14 March to shell airfields and other military installations on Kyūshū on 18 and 19 March. The next day, a Japanese aircraft hit the aircraft carrier USS Franklin with two 250 kg bombs, setting the fueled and armed aircraft on her flight deck on fire, and she lost all power. Pittsburgh came alongside and rescued 34 men from the water and with the light cruisers Santa Fe, Mobile and Biloxi managed to get a tow line on board the carrier to begin the task of towing the carrier. The cruiser continued her effort until midday on 20 March when Franklin was able to cast off the tow and proceed under her own power. Capt. Gingrich remained on the bridge for 48 hours during this time.

==== Okinawa ====
Between 23 March and 27 April, Pittsburgh guarded the carriers as they first prepared, covered and supported the invasion of Okinawa. Enemy airfields were interdicted, and the troops given close air support by the carriers. Pittsburgh helped repel enemy air attacks and launched her scout planes to rescue downed pilots. After replenishing at Ulithi, the force sailed on 8 May to attack the Ryukyu Islands and Southern Japan.

==== Damaged by a typhoon ====
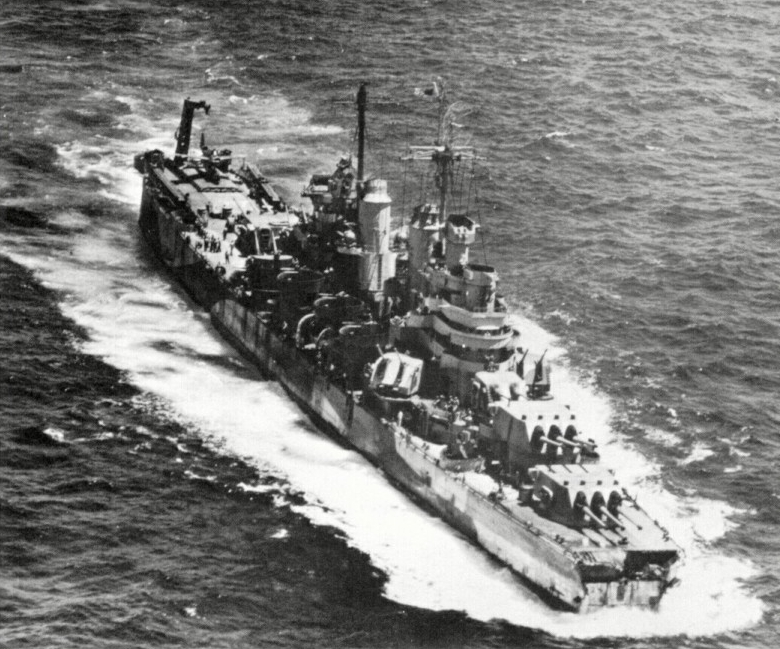
USS Pittsburgh after the typhoon, with her bow section missing.

On 4 June, Pittsburgh was caught in Typhoon Viper which increased to 70-knot (130 km/h) winds and 100-foot (30 m) waves. Her starboard scout plane was lifted off its catapult and dashed onto the deck by the wind, then shortly after her second deck buckled. Her bow was thrust upward, then sheared off, but there were no casualties. Still fighting the storm, and maneuvering to avoid being hit by her drifting bow structure, Pittsburgh was held quarter-on to the seas by her engine power while the forward bulkhead was shored. After a seven-hour battle, the storm subsided, and Pittsburgh proceeded at 6 knots (11 km/h) to Guam, arriving on 10 June. Her bow, nicknamed "McKeesport" (a suburb of Pittsburgh), was later salvaged by the tugboat USS Munsee and brought into Guam. The 104-foot section of bow broke off owing to poor plate welds at the Bethlehem Shipbuilding Co. at the Fore River Shipyard, Quincy, Massachusetts. The typhoon damage also earned her the nickname "Longest Ship in the World" as thousands of miles separated the bow and stern.

He did not believe the fracture could be blamed on a structural fault. "It just took two heavy seas. It couldn't possibly have held any longer. She's a fine staunch ship. We'll get the bow fixed and go right back out again." With a false bow, Pittsburgh left Guam on 24 June for Puget Sound Navy Yard, arriving 16 July. Still under repair at war's end, she was placed in reserve on 12 March 1946 and decommissioned on 7 March 1947.

=== Atlantic and Mediterranean, 1951–1954 ===
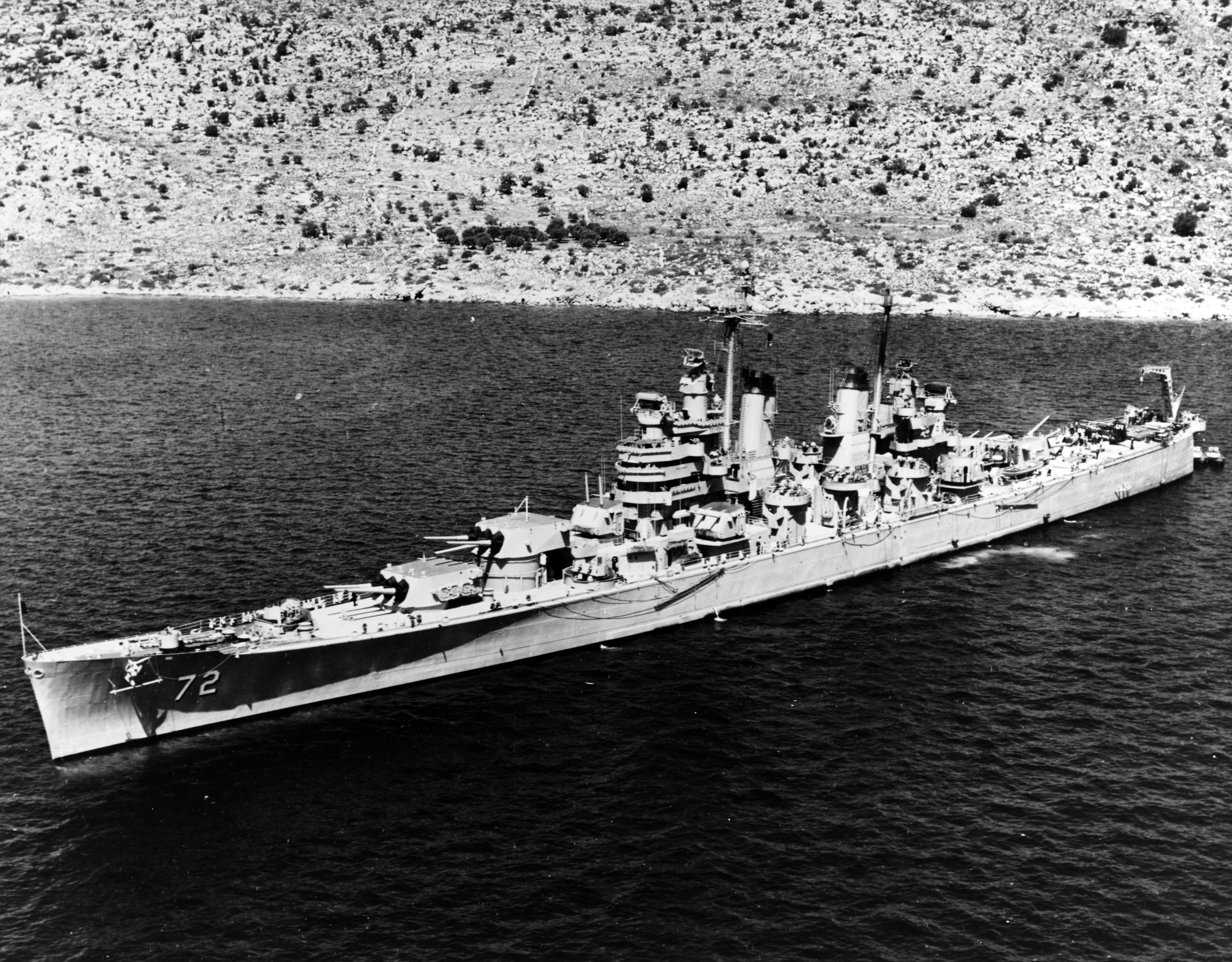
USS Pittsburgh anchored in Souda Bay, Crete, 8 May 1952.

As the Korean War called for a major restoration of US naval strength, Pittsburgh was recommissioned on 25 September 1951, with Capt. Preston V. Mercer in command. She sailed on 20 October for the Panama Canal, worked up out of Guantanamo Bay, Cuba, and prepared at Norfolk, Virginia for a tour of duty with the 6th Fleet sailing on 11 February 1952. Returning on 20 May, she joined in the Atlantic Fleet's schedule of exercises and special operations in the western Atlantic and Caribbean. At this time her captain was P D Gallery.

During her second Mediterranean tour of duty, sailing on 1 December, she flew the flag of Vice Admiral Jerauld Wright, Commander in Chief, Naval Forces Eastern Atlantic and the Mediterranean, for a good-will cruise to the Indian Ocean in January 1953. She returned to Norfolk in May for a major modernization overhaul, before rejoined the 6th Fleet at Gibraltar on 19 January 1954. Once again she carried Admiral Wright to ports of the Indian Ocean, returning to Norfolk on 26 May. During the summer of 1954, she engaged in further operations along the eastern seaboard and in the Caribbean. On 29 July 1954, Pittsburgh collided with another ship while sailing in the Saint Lawrence River. Damage to the hull was above the waterline and the holes were repaired.

=== Pacific, 1954–1956 ===
On 21 October 1954, she passed through the Panama Canal to join the Pacific Fleet, with Long Beach as her home port. She sailed for the Far East, calling at Pearl Harbor on 13 November and reaching Yokosuka on 26 November. She joined the 7th Fleet helping to cover the Chinese Nationalist defense of the Dachen Islands and evacuation of civilians and non-essential military personnel. Leaving Japan on 16 February 1955, she resumed course for the west coast before reporting to Puget Sound Naval Shipyard on 28 October to be deactivated.

=== Decommissioning and sale, 1956–1974 ===
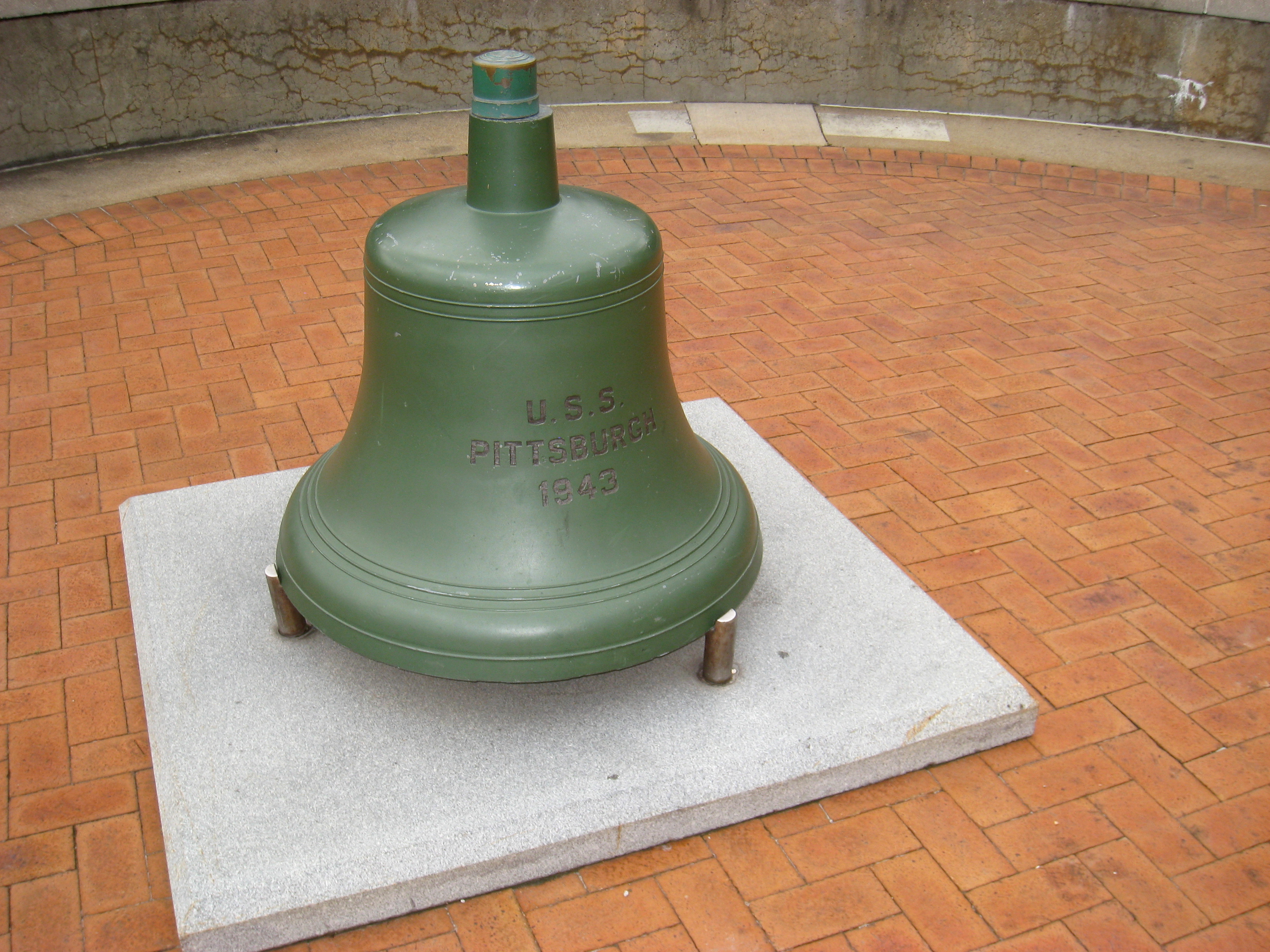
USS Pittsburghs Bell - Soldiers and Sailors Memorial Hall

Pittsburgh went into reserve on 28 April 1956, and was decommissioned at Bremerton on 28 August 1956. The ship remained there until stricken on 1 July 1973 and sold for scrap on 1 August 1974, to the Zidell Explorations Corp., Portland, Oregon. An anchor from USS Pittsburgh is on display in front of the Children's Museum at Allegheny Center in Pittsburgh, and the ship's bell is on display in front of Pittsburgh's Soldiers and Sailors Memorial Hall and Museum.

== Awards ==
Pittsburgh received two battle stars for World War II service.
