= Navy Distinguished Service Medal =

United States Naval Service's distinguished service medal

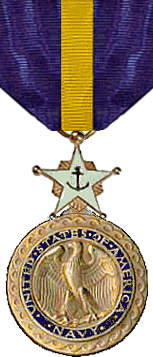
- Type: Military medal Distinguished service medal
- Awarded for: Exceptionally meritorious service in a duty of great responsibility
- Presented by: United States Department of the Navy
- Eligibility: United States Navy sailors and United States Marines
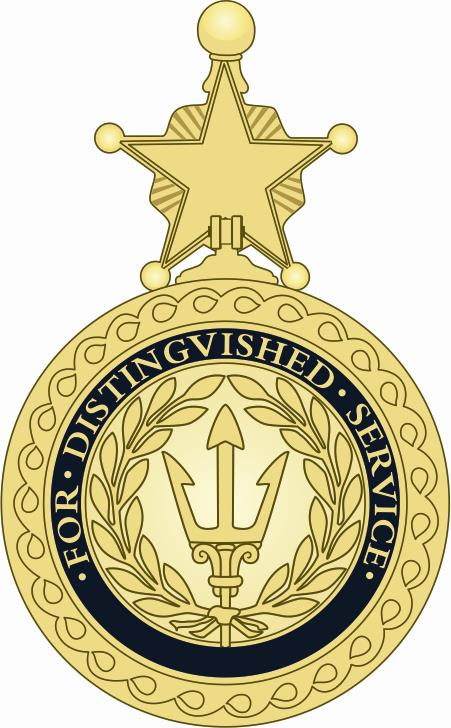
- Reverse
- Status: Currently awarded
- Established: 4 February 1919
- First award: 13 March 1919
- Service ribbon

Precedence
- Next (higher): Department of Defense: Defense Distinguished Service Medal; Department of Homeland Security: Homeland Security Distinguished Service Medal
- Equivalent: Army: Distinguished Service Medal; Air and Space Forces: Air Force Distinguished Service Medal; Coast Guard: Coast Guard Distinguished Service Medal
- Next (lower): Silver Star Medal

The Navy Distinguished Service Medal is a military decoration of the United States Navy and United States Marine Corps which was first created in 1919 and is presented to Sailors and Marines to recognize distinguished and exceptionally meritorious service to the United States while serving in a duty or position of great responsibility.

Navy Distinguished Service Medal is equivalent to the Army's Distinguished Service Medal, Air and Space Forces' Air Force Distinguished Service Medal, and the Coast Guard Distinguished Service Medal. The Navy Distinguished Service Medal was originally senior to the Navy Cross, until August 1942 when the precedence of the two decorations was reversed. Currently, it is worn after the Defense Distinguished Service Medal and before the Silver Star Medal.

== History ==
At the start of World War I, the Department of the Navy had the Medal of Honor as the only decoration with which to recognize heroism. To recognize acts deserving recognition, but at a level below that required for the Medal of Honor, the Navy Distinguished Service Medal and the Navy Cross were created by Public Law 253 on 4 February 1919. The law made the award retroactive to 6 April 1917. The first award of the decoration was a posthumous presentation to Brigadier General Charles A. Doyen, USMC, on 13 March 1919. Originally senior in precedence to the Navy Cross, the Navy Distinguished Service Medal assumed its current place below the Navy Cross by Congressional action on 7 August 1942.

== Criteria ==
The Navy Distinguished Service Medal is bestowed upon members of the Navy or Marine Corps who distinguish themselves by exceptionally meritorious service to the United States government in a duty of great responsibility. To justify this decoration, exceptional performance of duty must be clearly above that normally expected, and contributes to the success of a major command or project. Generally, the Distinguished Service Medal is awarded to officers in principal commands at sea, or in the field, whose service is of a manner to justify the award. However, this does not preclude the award of the Navy Distinguished Service Medal to any individual who meets the service requirements. The term "great responsibility" implies senior military responsibility, and the decoration is normally only bestowed to senior Navy flag officers and Marine Corps general officers, or extremely senior enlisted positions such as the Master Chief Petty Officer of the Navy or the Sergeant Major of the Marine Corps. In rare instances, it has also been awarded to Navy captains and Marine Corps colonels, typically those in positions of significant responsibility in direct support of senior flag and general officers, and then only by exception (usually at retirement).

== Appearance ==
The Navy Distinguished Service Medal is a gilt bronze medallion 1.25 inches (32 mm) in diameter. The obverse of the medal depicts an American bald eagle in the center displaying its wings. The eagle holds an olive branch in its right talon and arrows in its left talons. The eagle is surrounded by a blue enameled ring with the words, • UNITED • STATES • OF • AMERICA • at the top and • NAVY • at the bottom. Surrounding the blue enamel ring is a gold border of scroll waves depicted moving in a clockwise direction. The medal is surmounted by a white five-pointed star, point up, the points of the star being tipped with gold balls. In the center of the star is a blue anchor, while gold rays radiate between the arms of the star.

The reverse of the medal depicts a trident surrounded by a laurel wreath. The wreath is surrounded by a blue enamel ring containing the inscription FOR DISTINGUISHED SERVICE. Like the obverse, the blue enamel ring on the reverse is surrounded by scroll waves.

The medal's suspension and service ribbon is navy blue with a single central stripe of yellow. Additional awards of the Navy Distinguished Service Medal are denoted by gold and silver 5/16 inch stars worn on the medal's suspension and service ribbon.

== Notable recipients ==
- James F. Amos (2 awards)
- Edwin Anderson Jr.
- George W. Anderson (2 awards)
- John C. Aquilino (2 awards)
- David Architzel (2 awards)
- Jackson D. Arnold
- Stanley R. Arthur (3 awards)
- Bernard L. Austin (3 awards)
- Lee Baggett Jr. (2 awards)
- David W. Bagley
- Worth H. Bagley
- Ralph A. Bard
- George Barnett
- Micheal Barrett
- Robert H. Barrow
- Reginald R. Belknap
- William S. Benson
- Delbert Black
- William H. P. Blandy (4 awards)
- Walter F. Boone
- Jeremy M. Boorda (4 awards)
- Frank L. Bowman
- Alpha L. Bowser
- Omar Bradley
- Ted N. Branch
- Robert P. Briscoe
- Mark L. Bristol
- George S. Brown
- Miles Browning
- Arleigh Burke (3 awards)
- James B. Busey IV (3 awards)
- Duane R. Bushey
- John D. Butler
- Smedley Butler
- Richard E. Byrd (2 awards)
- James F. Caldwell Jr. (2 awards)
- Albert M. Calland III
- Joe Campa
- William B. Caperton
- Robert B. Carney (4 awards)
- Worrall Reed Carter
- Clifton B. Cates (2 awards)
- Leonard F. Chapman Jr. (3 awards)
- Jehu V. Chase
- Claire L. Chennault
- Henry G. Chiles Jr.
- Albert T. Church III
- Bernard A. Clarey (5 awards)
- Vern Clark (3 awards)
- Archie R. Clemins (3 awards)
- Robert E. Cleary
- Bruce W. Clingan (3 awards)
- Richard G. Colbert (2 awards)
- Robert H. Conn
- Michael J. Connor
- James T. Conway
- Charles M. Cooke Jr.
- Robert Coontz
- Lyman A. Cotten
- John G. Cotton
- Ralph W. Cousins (3 awards)
- James W. Crawford III
- Leland D. Crawford
- Thomas S. Crow
- William J. Crowe (3 awards)
- Maurice E. Curts (2 awards)
- Robert E. Cushman Jr. (4 awards)
- Peter H. Daly (2 awards)
- Philip S. Davidson (2 awards)
- Arthur C. Davis (2 awards)
- Donald C. Davis
- Bruce DeMars
- Nanette M. DeRenzi
- Martin Dempsey
- Louis E. Denfeld
- Robert L. Dennison
- Nanette M. DeRenzi
- Vincent P. de Poix (3 awards)
- Louis R. de Steiguer
- Kirkland H. Donald (3 awards)
- Walter Doran (2 awards)
- Charles A. Doyen
- Charles K. Duncan
- Kevin M. Donegan (2 awards)
- Joseph Dunford
- Charles W. Dyson
- Edward W. Eberle
- Thomas A. Edison
- Leon A. Edney (2 awards)
- Richard S. Edwards

c*Robert L. Eichelberger (4 awards)

- Dwight D. Eisenhower
- James O. Ellis
- Edward Ellsberg
- John L. Estrada
- Craig S. Faller
- William J. Fallon
- Peter J. Fanta
- Thomas B. Fargo (4 awards)
- William Fechteler (2 awards)
- Harry D. Felt (2 awards)
- Mark E. Ferguson III (3 awards)
- Jason K. Fettig
- James Fife (3 awards)
- James R. Fitzgerald (2 awards)
- Mark P. Fitzgerald (2 awards)
- William J. Flanagan Jr.
- Frank F. Fletcher
- Frank J. Fletcher
- Lisa Franchetti
- James G. Foggo III (2 awards)
- Sylvester R. Foley Jr. (2 awards)
- Ignatius J. Galantin
- Daniel V. Gallery
- Roy Alexander Gano
- Noel A. M. Gayler (2 awards)
- Edmund P. Giambastiani (5 awards)
- Albert Gleaves
- William E. Gortney (2 awards)
- Christopher W. Grady
- Alfred M. Gray Jr. (2 awards)
- Collin P. Green
- Jonathan W. Greenert (6 awards)
- Wallace M. Greene (2 awards)
- Charles D. Griffin (2 awards)
- Theodore W. Hack
- John Hagan
- Alexander Haig
- John L. Hall, Jr.
- William F. Halsey, Jr. (4 awards)
- Cecil D. Haney (2 awards)
- Huntington Hardisty
- Harry B. Harris Jr. (3 awards)
- Thomas C. Hart (2 awards)
- John C. Harvey Jr. (2 awards)
- Ronald J. Hays (4 awards)
- Thomas B. Hayward (3 awards)
- Arthur Japy Hepburn
- James L. Herdt
- Diego E. Hernández
- H. Kent Hewitt (2 awards)
- Frank T. Hines
- Thomas Holcomb
- James L. Holloway Jr.
- James L. Holloway III (4 awards)
- Ephraim P. Holmes
- Wilfred Holmes
- James R. Hogg (2 awards)
- Herbert G. Hopwood
- Frederick J. Horne
- Michelle Howard (2 awards)
- Charles F. Hughes
- John J. Hyland (2 awards)
- Royal E. Ingersoll
- Stuart H. Ingersoll (2 awards)
- Jonas H. Ingram (3 awards)
- Bobby Inman
- David E. Jeremiah (5 awards)
- Jay L. Johnson
- Jerome L. Johnson
- Means Johnston Jr. (2 awards)
- David C. Jones
- Hilary P. Jones
- Sara A. Joyner
- Timothy J. Keating (2 awards)
- Frank B. Kelso II (3 awards)
- Paul X. Kelley
- Carlton W. Kent
- Joseph D. Kernan (2 awards)
- Margaret G. Kibben
- Isaac C. Kidd Jr. (3 awards)
- Ernest J. King (3 awards)
- Tracy W. King (2 awards)
- Thomas C. Kinkaid (3 awards)
- George E. R. Kinnear II (2 awards)
- John Kirby
- Alan G. Kirk
- Austin M. Knight
- Charles C. Krulak (2 awards)
- Henry Louis Larsen (2 awards)
- Charles R. Larson (7 awards)
- Charles Henry Lauchheimer
- Edwin T. Layton
- William D. Leahy (3 awards)
- Julien J. LeBourgeois (2 awards)
- Lewis G. Lee
- Willis A. Lee (2 awards)
- John A. Lejeune
- Lyman Lemnitzer
- Samuel J. Locklear (2 awards)
- Charles A. Lockwood (3 awards)
- Robert L. J. Long (2 awards)
- Thomas J. Lopez (2 awards)
- James Lyons (2 awards)
- Douglas MacArthur
- Harold M. Martin
- James N. Mattis
- Henry H. Mauz Jr. (3 awards)
- Henry T. Mayo
- Mildred H. McAfee
- John S. McCain Sr. (3 awards)
- John S. McCain Jr. (2 awards)
- Keith B. McCutcheon (3 awards)
- David L. McDonald (2 awards)
- Wesley L. McDonald (2 awards)
- Kinnaird R. McKee
- Alford L. McMichael
- Joseph V. Medina
- George E. Mayer
- Wayne E. Meyer
- Frederick H. Michaelis (2 awards)
- Richard W. Mies
- Paul D. Miller (3 awards)
- Marc Mitscher (3 awards)
- Ben Moreell (2 awards)
- Thomas H. Moorer (5 awards)
- William F. Moran (2 awards)
- Michael Mullen (2 awards)
- Carl E. Mundy Jr.
- Charles L. Munns (2 awards)
- Orin G. Murfin
- Daniel J. Murphy
- Dennis J. Murphy
- John Murtha
- Richard Myers
- John B. Nathman (4 awards)
- Robert J. Natter (5 awards)
- Wendell C. Neville (2 awards)
- Chester W. Nimitz (4 awards)
- Eric T. Olson
- William A. Owens (2 awards)
- Peter Pace
- Randolph M. Pate
- Frank E. Petersen
- Donald L. Pilling
- William H. Plackett
- John Cyril Porte
- Carol M. Pottenger
- Colin Powell
- William V. Pratt
- Joseph W. Prueher
- Sean A. Pybus
- Arthur W. Radford (4 awards)
- Marion Frederic Ramírez de Arellano
- DeWitt Clinton Ramsey (2 awards)
- J. Paul Reason
- Joseph M. Reeves
- Eli T. Reich (2 awards)
- John M. Richardson (3 awards)
- Claude V. Ricketts
- Hyman G. Rickover (3 awards)
- Herbert D. Riley
- Maurice H. Rindskopf
- Horacio Rivero Jr. (3 awards)
- Joseph Rochefort (Posthumously awarded in 1985)
- Carson Abel Roberts
- Louis Robertshaw
- Samuel M. Robinson
- Hugh Rodman
- Bernard W. Rogers
- Michael S. Rogers
- Gary Roughead (2 awards)
- Ross E. Rowell
- James S. Russell (2 awards)
- John H. Russell Jr.
- Billy C. Sanders
- Walter M. Schirra
- Harry Schmidt (3 awards)
- Terry D. Scott
- David F. Sellers
- Benedict J. Semmes, Jr.
- James E. Service
- Sumner Shapiro
- U. S. Grant Sharp Jr. (2 awards)
- Harold E. Shear (2 awards)
- Alan Shepard
- Lemuel C. Shepherd Jr.
- Forrest P. Sherman
- Eric Shinseki
- David M. Shoup
- John H. Sides
- William Sims
- William N. Small (2 awards)
- Edward H. Smith
- Leighton W. Smith Jr.
- Harold Page Smith
- Holland M. Smith (4 awards)
- William D. Smith (2 awards)
- David W. Sommers
- Raymond A. Spruance (3 awards)
- William H. Standley
- Harold R. Stark (3 awards)
- James G. Stavridis
- Clark Daniel Stearns
- Michael D. Stevens
- Vincent R. Stewart
- James Stockdale (3 awards)
- Joseph C. Strasser
- Joseph Strauss
- Lewis Strauss
- William O. Studeman
- Felix Stump
- Scott H. Swift (3 awards)
- David W. Taylor
- Montgomery M. Taylor
- John S. Thach (2 awards)
- Kurt W. Tidd
- Jan E. Tighe
- John H. Towers
- Patricia Ann Tracey
- Harry D. Train II (4 awards)
- Carlisle Trost (3 awards)
- Jeffrey E. Trussler
- Richmond K. Turner (4 awards)
- Stansfield Turner
- Nathan F. Twining
- Pedro del Valle
- Alexander Vandegrift
- John W. Vessey Jr.
- Russell R. Waesche
- Robert Walker
- Patrick M. Walsh (3 awards)
- Thomas Washington
- James Watkins (3 awards)
- John P. Weinel (4 awards)
- Maurice F. Weisner (4 awards)
- Edward F. Welch, Jr.
- Waldemar F.A. Wendt (3 awards)
- Robert Wertheim (2 awards)
- Rick West
- Steven A. White
- John Whittet
- Alfred J. Whittle Jr. (2 awards)
- Henry A. Wiley
- Charles E. Wilhelm
- Theodore S. Wilkinson
- Robert F. Willard (3 awards)
- Henry B. Wilson
- James A. Winnefeld, Jr.
- Clark H. Woodward (2 awards)
- Jerauld Wright (2 awards)
- Harry E. Yarnell
- James A. Zimble
- Anthony Zinni
- Ronald J. Zlatoper
- Elmo Zumwalt (3 awards)

== See also ==
- Awards and decorations of the United States military
- Air Force Distinguished Service Medal
- Coast and Geodetic Survey Distinguished Service Medal
- Distinguished Service Medal (U.S. Army)
- Merchant Marine Distinguished Service Medal
