= John Phelan =

John or Jack Phelan may refer to:

- John J. Phelan (1851–1936), Supreme Knight of the Knights of Columbus and secretary of the State of Connecticut
- John J. Phelan (boxing) (1872–1946), American boxing commissioner and military officer
- John J. Phelan Jr. (1931–2012), American financier, also president, chairman and chief executive of the New York Stock Exchange
- John Paul Phelan (born 1978), Irish Fine Gael politician
- John Leddy Phelan (1924–1976), scholar of colonial Spanish America and the Philippines
- John Dennis Phelan (1809–1879), jurist and politician in the southern United States
- Jack Phelan (basketball, born 1925) (1925–2021), American professional basketball player for the Waterloo Hawks and Sheboygan Red Skins
- Jack Phelan (basketball, born 1954) (1954–2020), American college basketball coach of the University of Hartford
- John C. Phelan (born 1964), American businessman and former United States Secretary of the Navy
- John Henry Phelan (1877–1957), American oil producer and philanthropist
