= Ignatius J. Galantin =

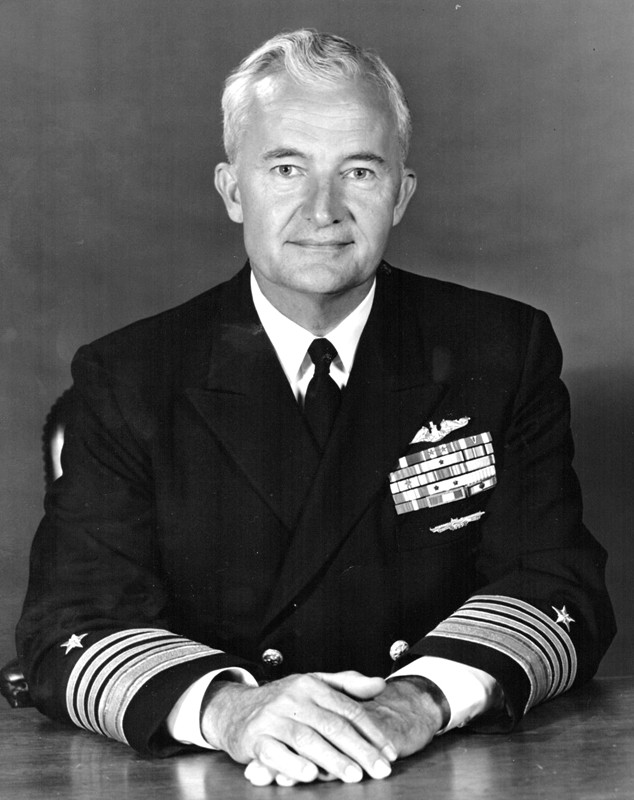
- Ignatius J. Gallantin
- Born: September 24, 1910; New York City, New York, U.S.
- Died: July 6, 2004 (aged 93); Atlantic Beach, Florida, U.S.
- Military career
- Allegiance: United States of America
- Branch: United States Navy
- Service years: 1933–1970
- Rank: Admiral
- Nickname: Pete
- Commands: USS R-11 (SS-88); USS Halibut (SS-232); Submarine Division 51; USS Navasota (AO-106); Submarine Squadron 7 Naval Material Command
- Conflicts: World War II; Korean War; Cold War
- Awards: Navy Cross; Navy Distinguished Service Medal; Silver Star (3)

Ignatius Joseph "Pete" Galantin (September 24, 1910 – July 6, 2004) was a four-star United States Navy admiral, World War II Navy Cross recipient, and the first commander of the Naval Material Command.

== Early career ==
Galatin was born in New York City, on September 24, 1910, son of Ignatius Peter and Mary Elizabeth (Binder) Galantin. He attended Maine Township High School, Des Plaines, Illinois, and had a year of night school at the Armour Institute of Technology in Chicago, before his appointment to the United States Naval Academy in 1929. As a midshipman he was captain of the fencing team, and in 1933 was intercollegiate champion. Graduated with the class of 1933-A and commissioned ensign, to rank from June 1, 1933, he subsequently advanced to the rank of admiral, to date from May 19, 1967.

After graduation from the Naval Academy, he served until December 1935 as a junior watch and division officer on board USS New York (BB-34), operating with Battleship Division ONE, Battle Force. He then had submarine training at the Submarine School, New London, Connecticut, and in July 1936 joined USS Argonaut (SM-1), the largest submarine-minelayer, to serve as first lieutenant and gunner officer in the Hawaiian Islands area. In June 1940 he reported as executive officer and navigator of USS S-24 (SS-129), which was transferred to the British early in the World War II period by lend-lease agreement.

== World War II ==
In August 1942 he assumed command of the USS R-11 (SS-88). Thereafter, in June 1943 he joined USS Sculpin (SS-191) as Prospective Commanding Officer and participated in one war patrol in the Pacific area. From August 1943 until December 1944 he was in command of USS Halibut (SS-232), which was awarded the Navy Unit Commendation for her tenth war patrol. He took part in the Battle of Leyte Gulf as Commanding Officer of Halibut, and sank a large Japanese warship off Cape Engamo, P.I. He was personally awarded the Navy Cross, the Silver Star and two Gold Stars in lieu of the second and third Silver Star Medal.

Halibut was so severely damaged by Japanese depth charges in November 1944 that she was not worth repairing and was decommissioned and later scrapped. Leaving Halibut, in January and February 1945 Galantin served as operations and gunnery officer on the Staff of Commander Submarine Squadron Ten, then flew over "the Hump" to Chongqing, China for three months’ duty as Submarine Liaison Officer to the Chief of the Naval Group. During the period June to November 1945, he served as operations and gunnery officer on the Staff of Commander Submarine Task Group, Saipan.

== Postwar ==
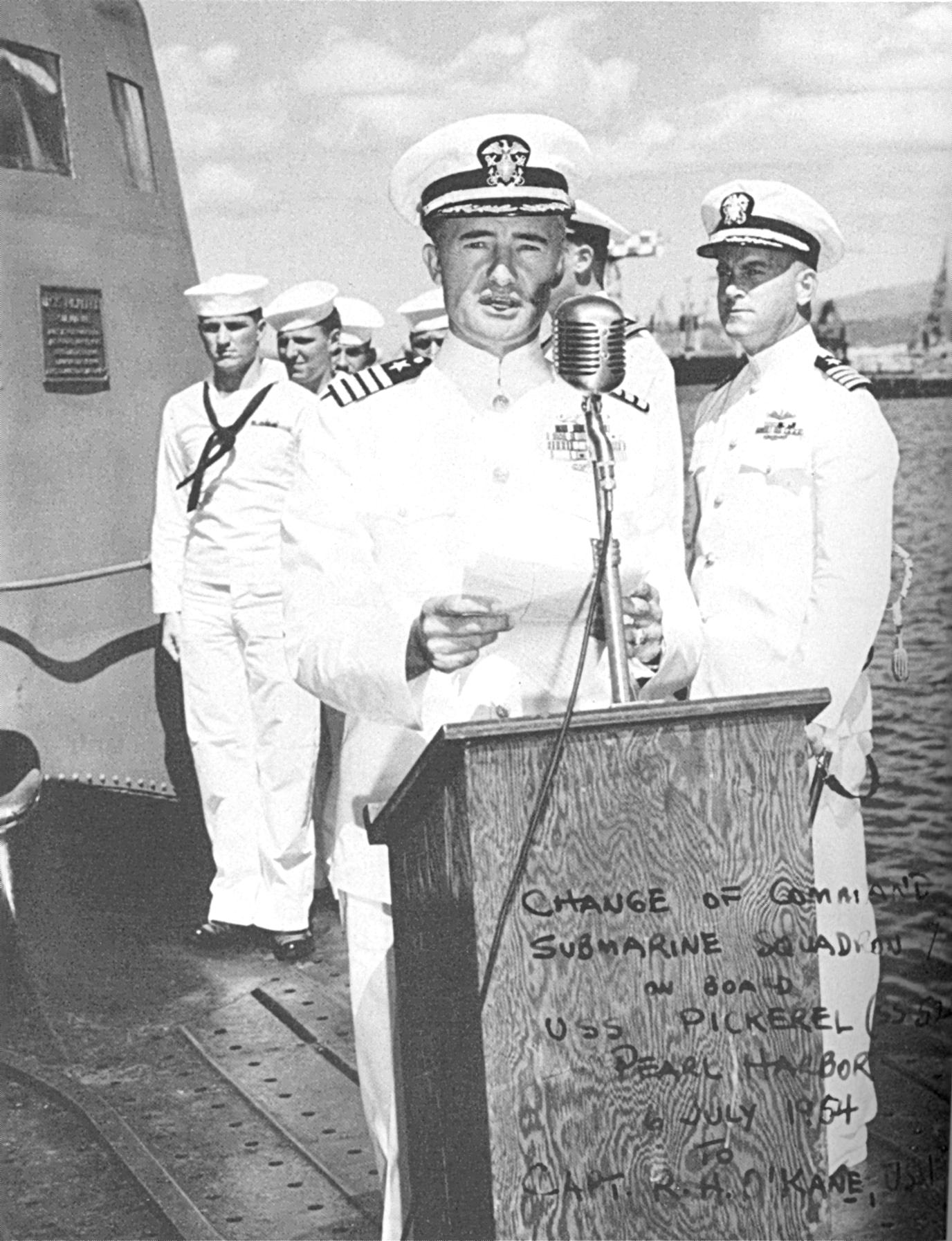
Relinquishing command of Submarine Squadron Seven, July 6, 1954.

Upon his return to the United States in November 1945, he was ordered to the Staff of Commander Submarines, Atlantic Fleet, and served as personnel officer until July 1947. After duty as executive officer of USS Proteus (AS-19), a submarine tender, he served as operations and gunnery officer on the Staff of Commander Submarine Squadron Eight. He had command of Submarine Division Fifty-one in 1949, and in December of that year reported to the Office of the Chief of Naval Operations, Navy Department, Washington, D.C., where he served until July 1952 as head of the Submarine Branch, Fleet Maintenance Division.

He assumed command of oiler USS Navasota (AO-106) in August 1952, and was awarded a Letter of Commendation with Ribbon and Combat "V," for "meritorious service as Commanding Officer of USS Navasota during combat operations against enemy North Korean and Chinese Communist forces in the Korean Theatre from February 15, 1953 to June 1, 1953…" The next year he commanded Submarine Squadron Seven, and from August 1954 to June 1955 was a student at the National War College in Washington, D.C.

== Flag officer ==
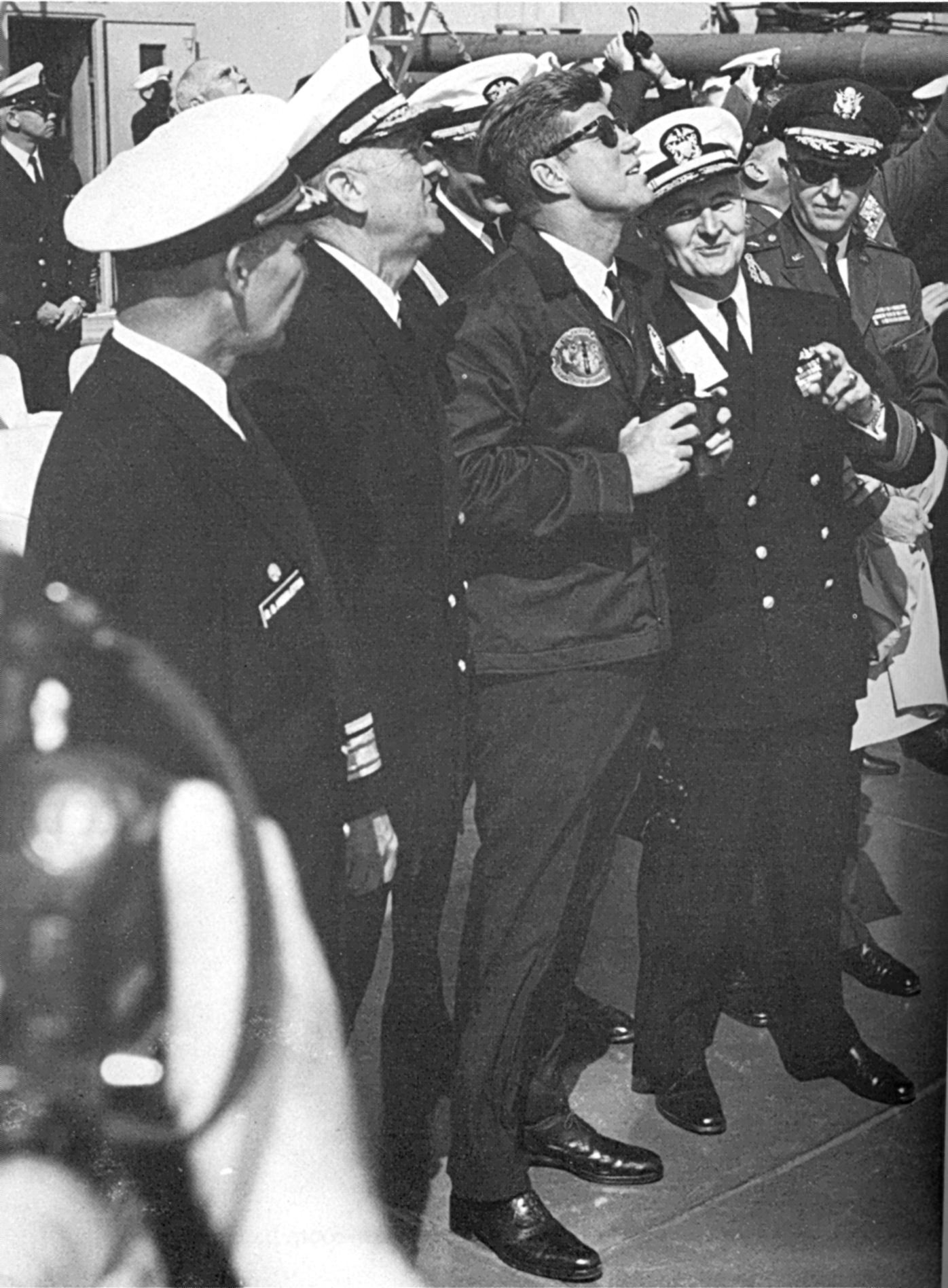
Observing Polaris missile launch with President John F. Kennedy, November 16, 1963.

Upon graduation from the National War College, he was ordered to the Office of the Chief of Naval Operations, Navy Department, where he served for two years as head of the Submarine Warfare Branch, Undersea Warfare Division. He was Deputy Chief of Staff for Logistics and Administration of the Commander in Chief, Allied Forces Southern Europe, stationed in Naples, Italy, from September 1957 until November 4, 1959, then reported as Commander Cruiser Division Two. In January 1961 he became Director of the Antisubmarine/Submarine Warfare Division, Office of the Chief of Naval Operations (later redesignated Submarine Warfare Division). On February 26, 1962 he was assigned to direct the Special Projects Office, which reported directly to the Secretary of the Navy. As he noted in his memoir, "Submarine Admiral," Galantin took great pride heading up the Polaris weapon system. He led the office as it transitioned to become the Fleet Ballistic Missile Projects Office [PM-1] in 1963. On March 1, 1965 he assumed duty as Chief of Naval Material. Upon the reorganization of the Navy Department, effective May 1, 1966, he was designated Chief of Naval Material, Naval Material Command.

== Legacy ==
Admiral Galantin was a member of the New York Society of Military and Naval Officers of the World Wars. He was married in 1935 to Virginia E. Jaeckel of New York. They had three daughters, six grandchildren and ten great-grandchildren.

On July 1, 1970 Admiral Galantin was transferred to the Retired List of the U.S. Navy. In retirement, he published two books concerning submarines: Take Her Deep! A Submarine Against Japan in World War II (1988), a more or less autobiographical account of Galantin’s wartime action when he was skipper of Halibut, and Submarine Admiral: From Battlewagons to Ballistic Missiles (1997), which describes the evolution of the submarine in the U.S. Navy.

Admiral Galantin died on July 6, 2004, at the age of 93. He was buried at the United States Naval Academy Cemetery with full military honors.

== Military awards ==
In addition to the Distinguished Service Medal, the Navy Cross, the Silver Star Medal with two Gold Stars, the Commendation Ribbon and the Navy Unit Commendation Ribbon, Galantin was awarded the American Defense Service Medal, Fleet Clasp; American Campaign Medal; Asiatic-Pacific Campaign Medal with five combat stars; the World War II Victory Medal; China Service Medal; National Defense Service Medal with bronze star; Korean Service Medal with two combat stars; and the United Nations Service Medal. He also has the Korean Presidential Unit Citation Badge and the Philippine Republic Presidential Unit Citation Badge.

1st Row	Navy Cross	Navy Distinguished Service Medal	Silver Star with two gold Stars	
2nd Row	Navy and Marine Corps Commendation Medal with Combat "V"	Navy Unit Commendation with one bronze star	American Defense Service Medal with Fleet Clasp	American Campaign Medal
3rd Row	Asiatic-Pacific Campaign Medal with one silver star	World War II Victory Medal	China Service Medal	National Defense Service Medal with one bronze star
4th Row	Korean Service Medal with two bronze stars	Presidential Unit Citation (Philippines)	Republic of Korea Presidential Unit Citation	United Nations Service Medal for Korea
