= Isaac C. Kidd Jr. =

United States Navy admiral

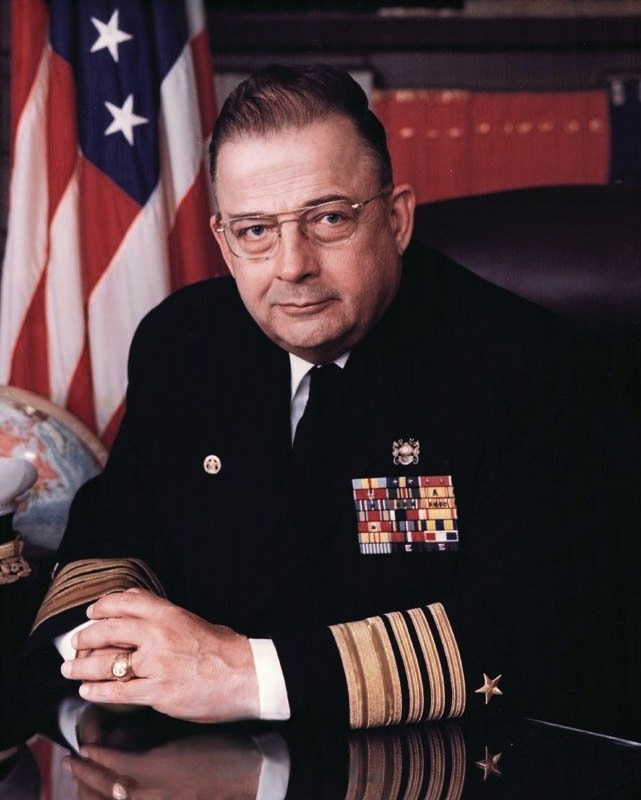
- Admiral Isaac C. Kidd Jr.
- Born: Isaac Campbell Kidd Jr. August 14, 1919; Cleveland, Ohio, US
- Died: June 27, 1999 (aged 79); Alexandria, Virginia, US
- Burial place: United States Naval Academy Cemetery
- Military career
- Allegiance: United States
- Branch: United States Navy
- Service years: 1941–1978
- Rank: Admiral
- Commands: USS Ellyson; USS Barry; Destroyer Squadron 32; Destroyer Squadron 18; Cruiser Destroyer Flotilla 12; US First Fleet; US Atlantic Fleet
- Conflicts: World War II: Battle of Iwo Jima
- Awards: Defense Distinguished Service Medal; Navy Distinguished Service Medal; Legion of Merit; Bronze Star
- Other work: College of William and Mary

Isaac Campbell Kidd Jr. (August 14, 1919 – June 27, 1999) was an American admiral in the United States Navy who served as the Supreme Allied Commander of NATO's Atlantic Fleet, and also as commander in chief of the U.S. Atlantic Fleet from 1975 to 1978. He was the son of Rear Admiral Isaac C. Kidd, who was killed on the bridge of the battleship Arizona during the Japanese attack on Pearl Harbor.

In 1978, Kidd was among a number of retired four-star officers who testified before Congress in favor of the controversial SALT II arms control pact.

== Biography ==
=== Graduation ===
Born in Cleveland, Ohio, Kidd graduated from the U.S. Naval Academy in 1941; he was commissioned an ensign on December 19, 1941, just 12 days after his father was killed aboard his flagship. As Time described the event, when Kidd received his commission as ensign "the U.S. Naval Academy and its guests broke into a thunderous cheer— an unprecedented demonstration in honor of Ensign Kidd and his father." During World War II he served as a gunnery and operations officer on destroyers in both Europe and the Pacific, and participated in various Allied landings in the Mediterranean as well as at Iwo Jima.

=== Naval service ===
His 23 years at sea during his 37-year naval career included 15 years in command of destroyers, destroyer divisions and squadrons and three U.S. fleets in the Atlantic, Pacific and Mediterranean; he also served as executive assistant and senior aide to the Chief of Naval Operations in the early 1960s, earning citations for his efforts in the Cuban Missile Crisis and several other crises. In 1967, he was chosen by his friend and colleague Admiral John S. McCain Jr. to head the Naval Court of Inquiry into the USS Liberty incident during the Six-Day War in June of that year. The Inquiry quickly became controversial amid allegations of a cover-up from both Liberty survivors and high-ranking Navy officers. The allegations concern the deliberateness of the Israeli attack and the suppression of evidence that would prove this. Captain Ward Boston, Admiral Kidd’s chief legal counsel, corroborated many of these claims in a 2004 affidavit. He also claimed that the entire Inquiry was a sham meant to exonerate Israel: “I know from personal conversations I had with Admiral Kidd that President Lyndon Johnson and Secretary of Defense Robert McNamara ordered him to conclude that the attack was a case of “mistaken identity” despite overwhelming evidence to the contrary.” From 1975 to 1978, Kidd served as Commander in Chief of the U.S. Atlantic Fleet.

=== Retirement ===
Shortly after his 1978 retirement, Kidd was among a number of retired four-star officers who testified before Congress in favor of the controversial SALT II arms control pact. Kidd declared that while he was not entirely thrilled with the proposed treaty's verification procedures, "the alternative of having no ceiling at all, considering our position at this point in the so-called race, I find totally unacceptable."

He also taught the law of the sea at the College of William and Mary. His six children included Navy Captain Isaac C. Kidd III.

Kidd died of cancer at age 79 at his home in Alexandria, Virginia, and was buried in the Naval Academy Cemetery.

== Awards and decorations ==

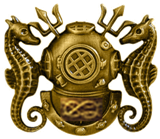

Navy Diving Officer Insignia
Defense Distinguished Service Medal	Navy Distinguished Service Medal with 2 stars	Legion of Merit with 2 stars
Bronze Star with "V" device	Navy Meritorious Unit Commendation	Navy Expeditionary Medal
China Service Medal	American Defense Service Medal with Atlantic Device	American Campaign Medal with star
European-African-Middle Eastern Campaign Medal with 3 stars	Asiatic-Pacific Campaign Medal with 4 stars	World War 2 Victory Medal
Navy Occupation Service Medal	National Defense Service Medal with star	Armed Forces Expeditionary Medal
Vietnam Service Medal	Philippine Republic Presidential Unit Citation	Philippine Liberation Medal
United Nations Korea Medal	Navy Expert Rifle Marksmanship Medal	Navy Expert Pistol Marksmanship Medal
Command at Sea Insignia worn on right breast pocket
