= Reporter (disambiguation) =

A reporter is a journalist.

Reporter(s) may also refer to:

- Reporter (surname)
- Court reporter, a person whose occupation is to transcribe spoken or recorded speech into written form to produce official transcripts of court hearings, depositions and other official proceedings.
- Law report, a reference book of legal decisions
- Reporter (Scotland), the title given to various officials of the Scottish Government
- Reporter (film), a 2009 documentary
- Reporter gene, a type of gene
- Reporter TV, a Malayalam-language news channel
- Northrop F-15 Reporter, a reconnaissance aircraft
- Reporter (TV series), a German television series.
- Reporter (album), a 2007 album by Goldenhorse
- Reporter (magazine), a political magazine published in Slovenia
- Reporter (typeface), a brush typeface created by German designer Carlos Winkow in 1938
- Reporter: A Memoir, autobiography of Seymour Hersh
- Reporters (TV programme), a British television news programme on BBC News
- Reporters (Indian TV series), an Indian newsroom drama television series
- Reporter, a newspaper published by the Lutheran Church–Missouri Synod
- The Reporter, journal succeeding the Anti-Slavery Reporter
- The Reporter (magazine), an American biweekly news magazine published 1949–1968

== See also ==
- Rapporteur, from the same root word
- The Reporter (disambiguation)
