= USS Andrew Jackson =

Submarine of the United States

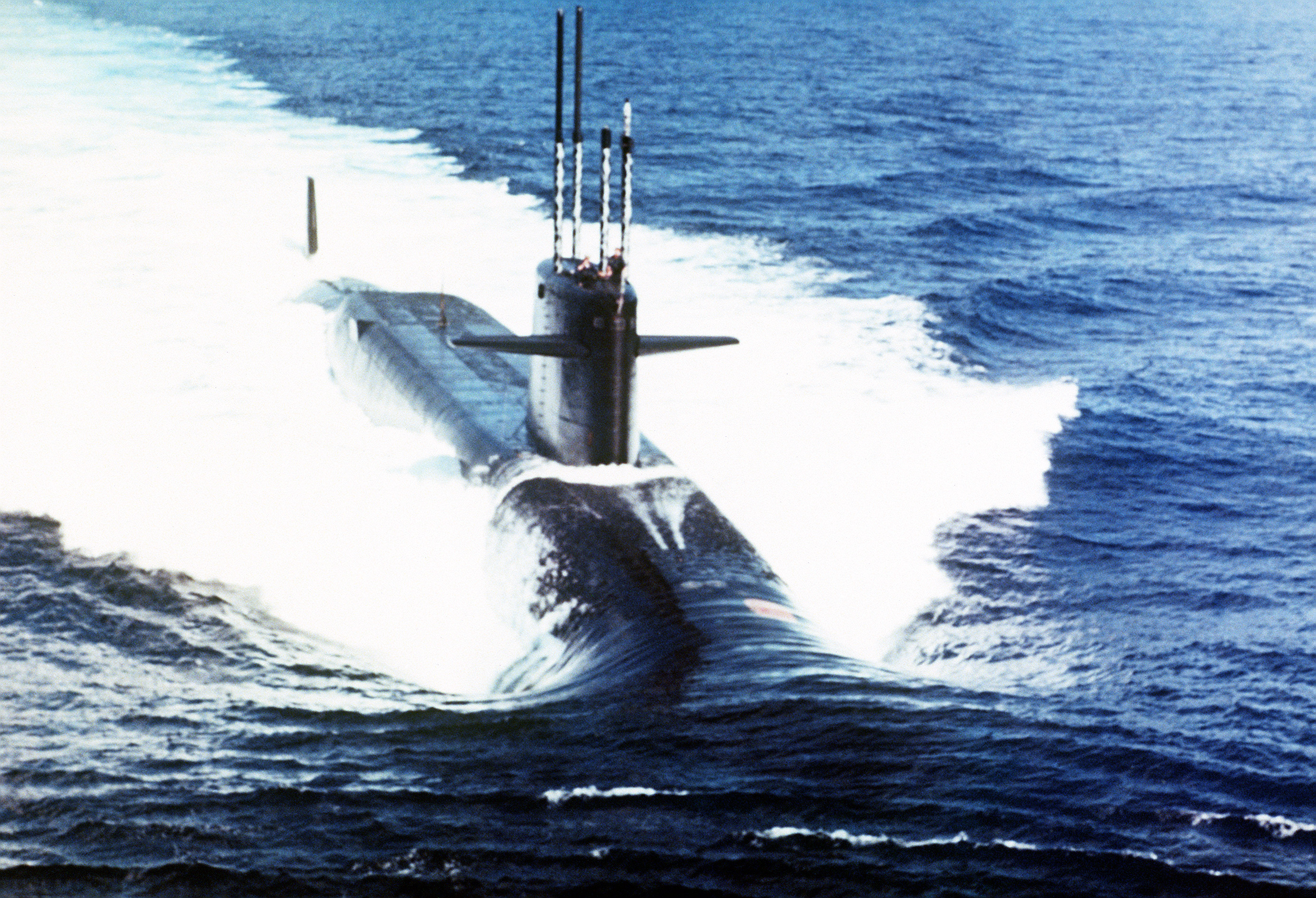
- USS Andrew Jackson (SSBN-619)

History

United States
- Name: USS Andrew Jackson
- Namesake: Andrew Jackson (1767–1845), seventh President of the United States (1829–1837)
- Ordered: 23 July 1960
- Builder: Mare Island Naval Shipyard, Vallejo, California
- Laid down: 26 April 1961
- Launched: 15 September 1962
- Sponsored by: Mrs. Estes Kefauver
- Commissioned: 3 July 1963
- Decommissioned: 31 August 1989
- Stricken: 31 August 1989
- Motto: One man with courage is a majority
- Fate: Scrapping via Ship-Submarine Recycling Program completed 30 August 1999

General characteristics
- Class & type: Lafayette-class submarine
- Type: Ballistic missile submarine (hull design SCB-216)
- Displacement: 7,250 long tons (7,370 t) surfaced; 8,250 long tons (8,380 t) submerged
- Length: 425 ft (130 m)
- Beam: 33 ft (10 m)
- Draft: 31 ft 6 in (9.60 m)
- Propulsion: 1 × S5W reactor; 2 × General Electric geared turbines=15,000 shp (11,000 kW)
- Speed: 20 knots (37 km/h) surfaced; 25 knots (46 km/h) submerged
- Complement: Two crews (Blue and Gold), 13 officers and 130 enlisted men each
- Sensors & processing systems: BQS-4 sonar
- Armament: 4 × 21 in (530 mm) Mark 65 torpedo tubes with Mark 113 firecontrol system, for Mark 48 torpedoes; 16 × vertical tubes for Polaris or Poseidon ballistic missiles

USS Andrew Jackson (SSBN-619) was a Lafayette-class nuclear-powered ballistic missile submarine. She was the second ship of the United States Navy to be named for Andrew Jackson (1767–1845), the seventh President of the United States (1829–1837).

== Construction and commissioning ==
The contract to build Andrew Jackson was awarded to Mare Island Naval Shipyard at Vallejo, California on 23 July 1960 and her keel was laid down on 26 April 1961. She was launched on 15 September 1962 sponsored by Nancy Patterson Pigott, wife of Tennessee Senator Estes Kefauver, and commissioned on 3 July 1963, with Commander Alfred J. Whittle, Jr. in command of the Blue Crew and Commander James B. Wilson in command of the Gold Crew.

She was 425 feet (130 m) long, 33 feet (10 m) wide, and had a draft of 32 feet (9.8 m). She displaced 7,250 tonnes (7,140 long tons; 7,990 short tons) when surfaced, and 8,250 tonnes (8,120 long tons; 9,090 short tons) when submerged. Her top speed was above 20 knots (37 km/h; 23 mph), and she had a maximum depth of 1,300 feet (400 m). She had a complement of around 120 men, and was armed with 16 Polaris missiles and four 21-inch (533 mm) torpedo tubes. She was propelled by a S5W Pressurized Water Nuclear Reactor powering two turbines which generated 15,000 shaft horsepower (11,000 kW), driving one propeller.

== Operational history ==
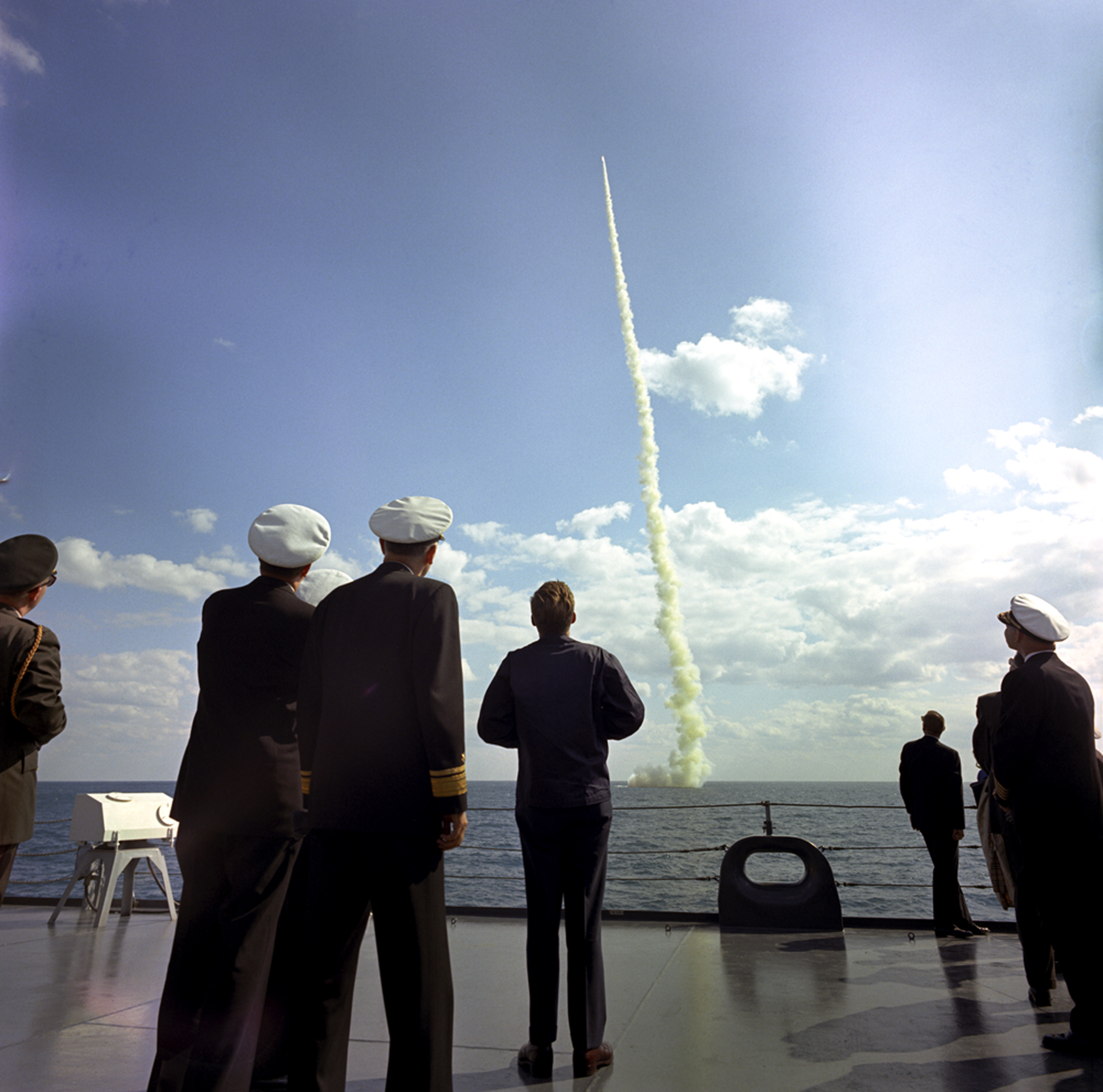
President Kennedy watching USS Andrew Jackson launch a Polaris A-2 missile.

Following commissioning, Andrew Jackson sailed via the Panama Canal to the United States East Coast. On 1 October and 11 October 1963, during shakedown training out of Cape Canaveral, Florida, she successfully launched Polaris A-2 ballistic missiles. On 26 October 1963, she sent Polaris A-3X missiles into space in the first submerged launching of its type; she repeated the feat on 11 November 1963. On 16 November 1963, six days before his assassination, President John F. Kennedy—embarked in the missile range instrumentation ship USS Observation Island—observed Andrew Jackson launch another Polaris A-2 ballistic missile from a point off Cape Canaveral and congratulated Commander Wilson and his crew for "impressive teamwork."

=== USS Liberty incident ===
There is speculation amongst survivors of the 1967 Israeli attack on USS Liberty and their supporters that a U.S. Navy submarine observed and filmed the attack through their periscope. The working theory is that the submarine was either the Andrew Jackson or USS Amberjack. The Andrew Jackson was assigned to Submarine Squadron 16, Submarine Force, Atlantic Fleet from 1964 to 1973, where she conducted patrols out of the American naval base at Rota, Spain. This would mean she could, in theory, have been in the vicinity of the attack when it occurred. There is no confirmation of this theory and it remains speculative.

In 1988, the LBJ Presidential Library declassified and released a document from the Liberty archive with the "Top Secret—Eyes Only" security caveat (Document #12C sanitized and released 21DEC88 under review case 86–199). This "Memorandum for the Record" dated 10 April 1967 reported a briefing of the "303 Committee" by General Ralph D. Steakley. According to the memo, General Steakley "briefed the committee on a sensitive DOD project known as FRONTLET 615," which is identified in a handwritten note on the original memorandum as "submarine within U.A.R. waters." Further Freedom of Information Act requests returned no information on any project called "FRONTLET 615." This has lent credence to the theory that a U.S. Navy submarine was present during the attack.

The 1981 book Weapons by Russell Warren Howe says that Liberty was accompanied by the Andrew Jackson, which filmed the entire episode through its periscope but was unable to provide assistance.

== Decommissioning and disposal ==
Andrew Jackson was decommissioned on 31 August 1989 and stricken from the Naval Vessel Register on the same day. Ex-Andrew Jackson entered the Nuclear Powered Ship and Submarine Recycling Program in Bremerton, Washington. Recycling of Ex-Andrew Jackson was completed 30 August 1999.
