= Reporter (surname) =

Reporter is the surname of the following notable people:

- Ardeshir Reporter (1865–1932), British spy in Iran
- Piloo Reporter (1938–2023), Indian international cricket umpire
- Shapoor Reporter (1921–2013), British spy in Iran, son of Ardeshir
