= USS Liberty incident =

1967 Israeli attack on United States Navy ship

- Part of the Six-Day War
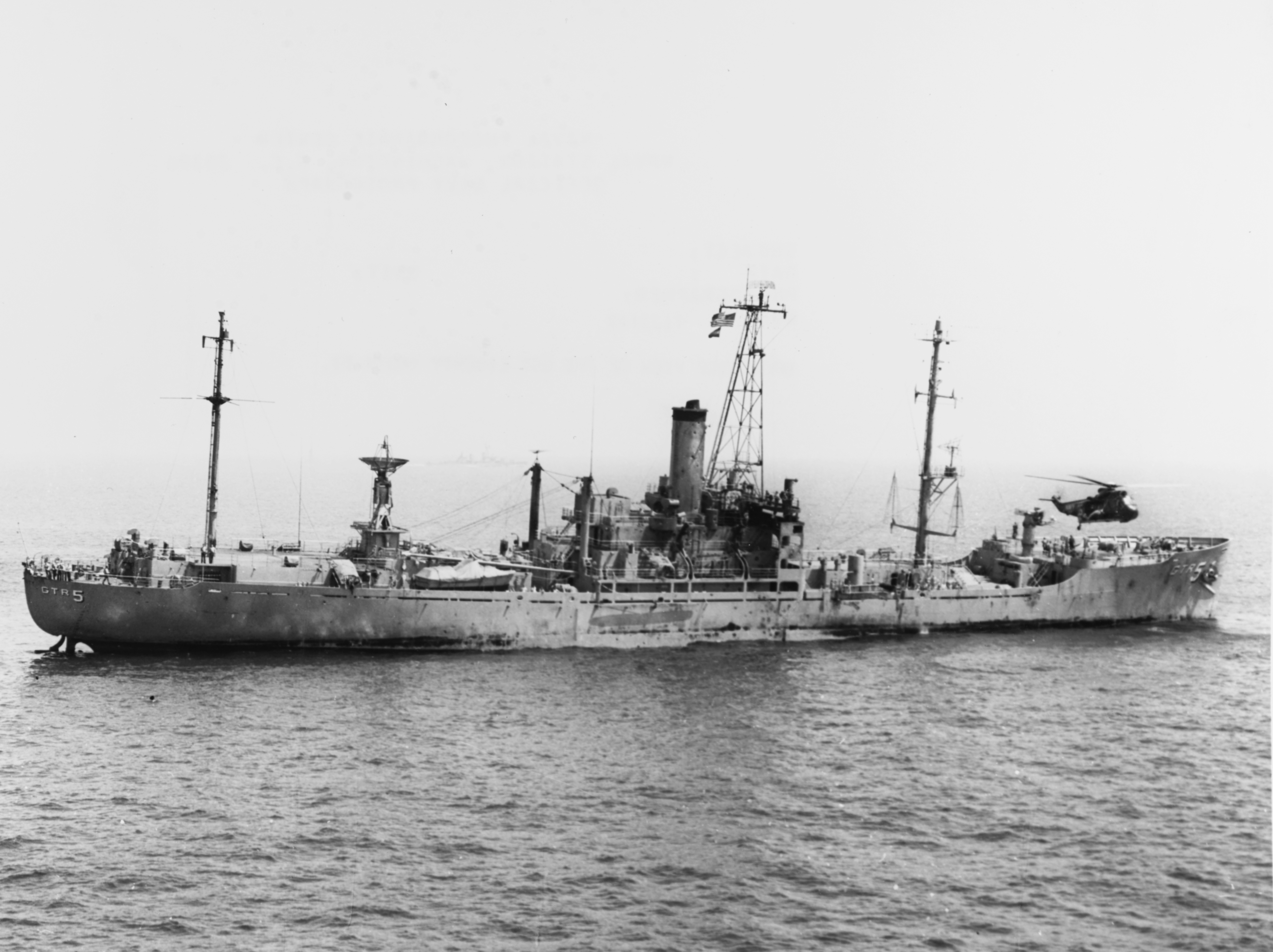
- Damaged USS Liberty on 9 June 1967, one day after attack
Date	8 June 1967
Location	Mediterranean Sea near the Sinai Peninsula 31.39°N 33.38°E
Result	See Aftermath of the attack

Participants
Israel	United States

Commanders and leaders
Captain Iftach Spector; Lieutenant Commander Moshe Oren	Commander William L. McGonagle

Strength
2 Mirage IIIs; 2 Mystère IVs; 3 motor torpedo boats	1 technical research ship

Casualties and losses
None	34 killed 171 wounded 1 ship heavily damaged
- Location within Sinai USS Liberty incident (Egypt)

The USS Liberty incident was an attack on a United States Navy technical research ship (a spy ship), USS Liberty, by Israeli Air Force jet fighter aircraft and Israeli Navy motor torpedo boats, on 8 June 1967, during the Six-Day War. The attack killed 34 crew members (naval officers, seamen, two marines, and one civilian NSA employee), wounded 171 crew members, and severely damaged the ship. Both the Israeli and United States governments conducted inquiries and issued reports that concluded the attack was a mistake due to Israeli confusion about the ship's identity.

The combined air and sea attack lasted 23 minutes and was carried out by air strafing and napalm bombing by four Mirage III and Super Mystères fighters, and gunfire and torpedo launches from the motor boats, one of which impacted the ship. Israeli forces terminated their attack after the torpedo impact, believing the ship to be sinking. At the time, the ship was in international waters north of the Sinai Peninsula, about 25.5 nautical miles (47.2 km; 29.3 mi) northwest from the Egyptian city of Arish.

Israel apologized for the attack, saying that USS Liberty had been attacked in error after being mistaken for an Egyptian ship. Others, including survivors of the attack, dispute this account, and state that the attack was deliberate. Thomas Hinman Moorer, the 7th chairman of the Joint Chiefs of Staff, accused President Lyndon B. Johnson of having covered up that the attack was a deliberate act. In 2004, Ward Boston, who served as chief counsel to the Naval Board of Inquiry that investigated the attack, signed an affidavit stating that President Johnson and secretary of defense Robert McNamara had ordered that the assault be ruled an accident and to reach the conclusion "that the attack was a case of 'mistaken identity' despite 'overwhelming evidence to the contrary.'"

In May 1968, the Israeli government paid US$3.32 million (equivalent to US$30.8 million in 2025) to the U.S. government in compensation for the families of the 34 men killed in the attack. In March 1969, Israel paid a further $3.57 million ($31.3 million in 2025) to the men who had been wounded. In December 1980, it agreed to pay $6 million ($23.4 million in 2025) as the final settlement for material damage to the ship plus 13 years of interest.

== USS Liberty ==
USS Liberty was originally the 7,725-long-ton (7,849 t) light civilian cargo vessel Simmons Victory, a mass-produced, standard-design Victory ship, the follow-on series to the famous Liberty ships that supplied the Allies with cargo during World War II. It was acquired by the United States Navy and converted to an auxiliary technical research ship (AGTR), a cover name for National Security Agency (NSA) "spy ships" carrying out signals intelligence missions. It carried out five operations in waters off the west coast of Africa leading up to 1967.

== Attack on the Liberty ==
=== Events leading to the attack ===
During the Six-Day War between Israel and several Arab nations, the United States declared its neutrality. Several days before the war began, USS Liberty was ordered to the eastern Mediterranean to gather signals intelligence in international waters near the north coast of Sinai, Egypt.

According to Israeli sources, at the start of the war on 5 June, General Yitzhak Rabin, Israeli Air Force (IAF) chief of staff, informed Commander Ernest Carl Castle, the American naval attaché in Tel Aviv, that Israel would defend its coast by every means including sinking unidentified ships. He asked the U.S. to keep its ships away from Israel's coast, or at least inform Israel of their exact positions. (Note: The failure of the Israeli navy's attacks on Egyptian and Syrian ports early in the war did little to assuage Israel's fears. The U.S. had previously rejected Israel's request for a formal naval liaison. On 31 May, Avraham Harman, Israel's ambassador to Washington, had warned Under Secretary of State Eugene V. Rostow that if war breaks out, "we would have no telephone number to call, no code for plane recognition, and no way to get in touch with the U.S. Sixth Fleet".)

However, American sources said that no such inquiry about ships was made until after the attack on Liberty. Replying to U.S. Secretary of State Dean Rusk after the attack, U.S. Ambassador Walworth Barbour in Tel Aviv, Israel responded: "No request for info on U.S. ships operating off Sinai was made until after Liberty incident. [ . . . ] Had Israelis made such an inquiry it would have been forwarded immediately to the chief of naval operations and other high naval commands and repeated to dept [Department of State]."

At the outbreak of war, Captain William L. McGonagle of Liberty immediately asked Vice Admiral William I. Martin at the United States Sixth Fleet headquarters to send a destroyer to accompany Liberty and serve as its armed escort and as an auxiliary communications center. The following day, Admiral Martin replied: "Liberty is a clearly marked United States ship in international waters, not a participant in the conflict and not a reasonable subject for attack by any nation. Request denied." He promised, however, that in the unlikely event of an inadvertent attack, jet fighters from the Sixth Fleet would be overhead in ten minutes.

At the United Nations on 6 June, U.S. Ambassador Arthur Goldberg told the United Nations Security Council that vessels of the Sixth Fleet were several hundred miles from the conflict, in response to Egyptian complaints that the United States was supporting Israel. When this statement was made, it was in fact true; Liberty, now assigned to the Sixth Fleet, was in the central Mediterranean Sea, passing between Libya and Crete, but it would ultimately steam to about 13 nmi (24 km; 15 mi) north of the Sinai Peninsula.

On the night of 7 June Washington time, early morning on 8 June, 01:10 Zulu or 03:10 local time, the Pentagon issued an order to Sixth Fleet headquarters to tell Liberty to come no closer than 100 nmi (190 km; 120 mi) to Israel, Syria, or the Sinai coast (Oren, p. 263). According to the Naval Court of Inquiry and the National Security Agency official history, the order to withdraw was not sent on the radio frequency that Liberty monitored for her orders until 15:25 Zulu, several hours after the attack, due to a long series of administrative and message routing problems. The Navy said a large volume of unrelated high-precedence traffic, including intelligence intercepts related to the conflict, were being handled at the time; and that this combined with a shortage of qualified radiomen contributed to the delayed transmission of the withdrawal message.

=== Visual contact ===
Official testimony combined with Liberty's deck log establish that throughout the morning of the attack, 8 June, the ship was overflown, at various times and locations, by IAF aircraft. The primary aircraft type was the Nord Noratlas; there were also two unidentified delta-wing jets at about 09:00 Sinai time (GMT+2). Liberty officer Ennes says that the Noratlas aircraft flew so close to Liberty that noise from its propellers rattled the ship's deck plating. It was later reported, based on information from IDF sources, that the over-flights were coincidental, and that the aircraft were hunting for Egyptian submarines that had been spotted near the coast.

At about 05:45 Sinai time, a ship-sighting report was received at Israeli Central Coastal Command (CCC) in respect of Liberty, identified by an aerial naval observer as "apparently a destroyer, sailing 110 km (70 mi) west of Gaza". The vessel's location was marked on a CCC control table, using a red marker, indicating an unidentified vessel. At about 06:00, the aerial naval observer, Major Uri Meretz, reported that the ship appeared to be a U.S. Navy supply ship; at about 09:00 the red marker was replaced with a green marker to indicate a neutral vessel. About the same time, an Israeli jet fighter pilot reported that a ship 32.2 km (20 mi) north of Arish had fired at his aircraft after he tried to identify the vessel. Israeli naval command dispatched two destroyers to investigate, but they were returned to their previous positions at 09:40 after doubts emerged during the pilot's debriefing. After the naval observer's Noratlas landed and he was debriefed, the ship he saw was further identified as USS Liberty, based on its "GTR-5" hull markings. USS Liberty's marker was removed from CCC's Control Table at 11:00, due to its positional information being considered out of date.

At 11:24, the Israeli chief of naval operations received a report that Arish was being shelled from the sea. An inquiry into the source of the report was ordered to determine its validity. The report came from an air support officer in Arish. Additionally, at 11:27 the Israeli Supreme Command head of operations received a report stating that a ship had been shelling Arish, but the shells had fallen short. (The investigative journalist James Bamford points out that Liberty had only four .50 caliber machine guns mounted on her decks and thus could not have shelled the coast.) The Head of Operations ordered that the report be verified, and that it be determined whether or not Israeli Navy vessels were off the coast of Arish. At 11:45, another report arrived at Supreme Command saying two ships were approaching the Arish coast.

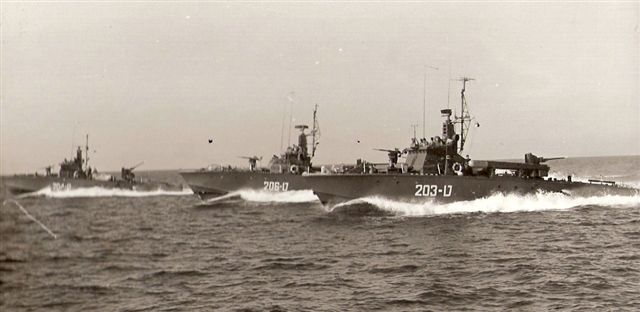
Israeli Motor Torpedo Boats (MTBs) in formation, c. 1967. These were the MTBs that attacked USS Liberty.

The shelling and ship reports were passed from Supreme Command to Fleet Operations control center. The chief of naval operations took them seriously, and at 12:05 torpedo boat Division 914 was ordered to patrol in the direction of Arish. Division 914, codenamed "Pagoda", was under the command of Commander Moshe Oren. It consisted of three torpedo boats numbered: T-203, T-204 and T-206. At 12:15, Division 914 received orders to patrol a position 32 km (20 mi) north of Arish. As Commander Oren headed toward Arish, he was informed by Naval Operations of the reported shelling of Arish and told that IAF aircraft would be dispatched to the area after the target had been detected. Chief of Staff Yitzhak Rabin was concerned that the supposed Egyptian shelling was the prelude to an amphibious landing that could outflank Israeli forces. Rabin reiterated the standing order to sink any unidentified ships in the area, but advised caution, as Soviet vessels were reportedly operating nearby. At 13:41, the torpedo boats detected an unknown vessel 20 miles northwest of Arish and 14 miles (23 km) off the coast of Bardawil. The ship's speed was estimated on their radars. The combat information center officer on T-204, Ensign Aharon Yifrah, reported to Oren that the target had been detected at a range of 22 miles (35 km), that her speed had been tracked for a few minutes, after which he had determined that the target was moving westward at a speed of 30 knots (56 km/h; 35 mph). These data were forwarded to the Fleet Operations control center.

The speed of the target was significant because it indicated that the target was a combat vessel. Moreover, Israeli forces had standing orders to fire on any unknown vessels sailing in the area at over 20 knots (37 km/h; 23 mph), a speed which, at the time, could be attained only by warships. The chief of naval operations asked the torpedo boats to double-check their calculations. Yifrah twice recalculated and confirmed his assessment. A few minutes later, Commander Oren reported that the target, now 17 miles (27 km) from his position, was moving at a speed of 28 knots (52 km/h; 32 mph) on a different heading. Bamford, however, points out that Liberty's top speed was far below 28 knots. His sources say that at the time of the attack Liberty was following her signal-intercept mission course along the northern Sinai coast, at about 5 knots (9.3 km/h; 5.8 mph) speed.

The data on the ship's speed, together with its direction, gave the impression that it was an Egyptian destroyer fleeing toward port after shelling Arish. The torpedo boats gave chase, but did not expect to overtake their target before it reached Egypt. Commander Oren requested that the Israeli Air Force dispatch aircraft to intercept. At 13:48, the chief of naval operations requested dispatch of fighter aircraft to the ship's location.

Hunt-class destroyer HMS Blean. The Egyptian Navy had Hunt-class destroyers in 1967.

The IAF dispatched a flight of two Mirage III fighter jets codenamed Kursa flight which arrived at Liberty at about 14:00. The formation leader, Captain Iftach Spector, attempted to identify the ship. He radioed to one of the torpedo boats his observation that the ship looked like a military ship with one smokestack and one mast. He also communicated, in effect, that the ship appeared to him like a destroyer or another type of small ship. In a post-attack statement, the pilots said they saw no distinguishable markings or flag on the ship.

At this point, a recorded exchange took place between a command headquarters weapons systems officer, one of the air controllers, and the chief air controller questioning a possible American presence. Immediately after the exchange, at 13:57, the chief air controller, Lieutenant-Colonel Shmuel Kislev, cleared the Mirages to attack.

=== Air and sea attacks ===
After being cleared to attack, the Mirages dove on the ship and attacked with 30-mm cannons and rockets. The attack came a few minutes after the crew completed a chemical attack drill, with Captain McGonagle on the command bridge. The crew was in "stand-down mode", with their helmets and life jackets removed. Battle readiness "modified condition three" was set, which meant that the ship's four .50 caliber machine guns were manned and ammunition was ready for loading and firing. Eight crewmen either were killed immediately or received fatal injuries and died later, and 75 were wounded. Among the wounded was McGonagle, who was hit in the right thigh and arm. During the attack, antennas were severed, gas drums caught fire, and the ship's flag was knocked down. McGonagle sent an urgent request for help to the Sixth Fleet, "Under attack by unidentified jet aircraft, require immediate assistance".

The Mirages left after expending their ammunition, and were replaced by a flight of two Dassault Super Mystères codenamed Royal flight. The Mysteres were armed with napalm bombs, and were flown by Captain Yossi Zuk and his wingman, Yaakov Hamermish. The Mysteres released their payloads over the ship and strafed it with their cannons. Much of the ship's superstructure caught fire. The Mysteres were readying to attack again when the Israeli Navy, alerted by the absence of return fire, warned Kislev that the target could be Israeli. Kislev told the pilots not to attack if there was any doubt about identification, and the Israeli Navy quickly contacted all of its vessels in the area. The Israeli Navy found that none of its vessels were under fire, and the aircraft were cleared to attack. However, Kislev was still disturbed by a lack of return fire and requested one last attempt to identify the ship. Captain Zuk made an attempt at identification while strafing the ship. He reported seeing no flag, but saw the ship's GTR-5 marking. Kislev immediately ordered the attack stopped. Kislev guessed that the ship was American.

The fact that the ship had Latin alphabet markings led Chief of Staff Rabin to fear that the ship was Soviet. Rabin ordered the torpedo boats to remain at a safe distance from the ship, and sent in two Aérospatiale SA 321 Super Frelon helicopters to search for survivors. These radio communications were recorded by Israel. The order was also recorded in the torpedo boat's log, although Commander Oren claimed not to have received it. The order to cease fire was given at 14:20, twenty-four minutes before the torpedo boats arrived at the Liberty's position. (Note: While Egyptian naval ships were known to disguise their identities with Western markings, they usually displayed Arabic letters and numbers only. The fact that the ship had Western markings led Rabin to fear that it was Soviet, and he immediately called off the jets. Two IAF Super Frelon helicopters were sent to look for survivors – Spector had reported seeing men overboard – while the torpedo boat squadron was ordered to hold its fire pending further attempts at identification. Though that order was recorded in the torpedo boat's log, [the commander], Oren, claimed he never received it.)

During the interval, crewmen aboard Liberty hoisted a large American flag. During the early part of the air attack and before the torpedo boats were sighted, Liberty sent a distress message that was received by Sixth Fleet aircraft carrier USS Saratoga. Aircraft carrier USS America dispatched eight aircraft. The carrier had been in the middle of strategic exercises. Vice-Admiral William I. Martin recalled the aircraft minutes later.

McGonagle testified at the naval court of inquiry that during

the latter moments of the air attack, it was noted that three high speed boats were approaching the ship from the northeast on a relative bearing of approximately 135 [degrees] at a distance of about 15 [nautical] miles. The ship at the time was still on [westward] course 283 [degrees] true, speed unknown, but believed to be in excess of five knots.

McGonagle testified that he "believed that the time of initial sighting of the torpedo boats ... was about 14:20", and that the "boats appeared to be in a wedge type formation with the center boat the lead point of the wedge. Estimated speed of the boats was about 27 to 30 knots [50 to 56 km/h]", and that it "appeared that they were approaching the ship in a torpedo launch attitude".

When the torpedo boats arrived, Commander Oren could see that the ship could not be the destroyer that had supposedly shelled Arish or any ship capable of 30 knots (56 km/h) speed. According to Michael Limor, an Israeli naval reservist serving on one of the torpedo boats, they attempted to contact the ship by heliograph and radio, but received no response. At 6,000 meters (20,000 ft), T-204 paused and signalled "AA", which means "identify yourself". Due to damaged equipment, McGonagle could only reply using a handheld Aldis lamp. Oren recalled receiving a similar response from the Ibrahim el Awal, an Egyptian destroyer captured by Israel during the Suez Crisis, and was convinced that he was facing an enemy ship. He consulted an Israeli identification guide to Arab fleets and concluded the ship was the Egyptian supply ship El Quseir, based on observing its deckline, midship bridge and smokestack. The captain of boat T-203 reached the same conclusion independently. The boats moved into battle formation, but did not attack.

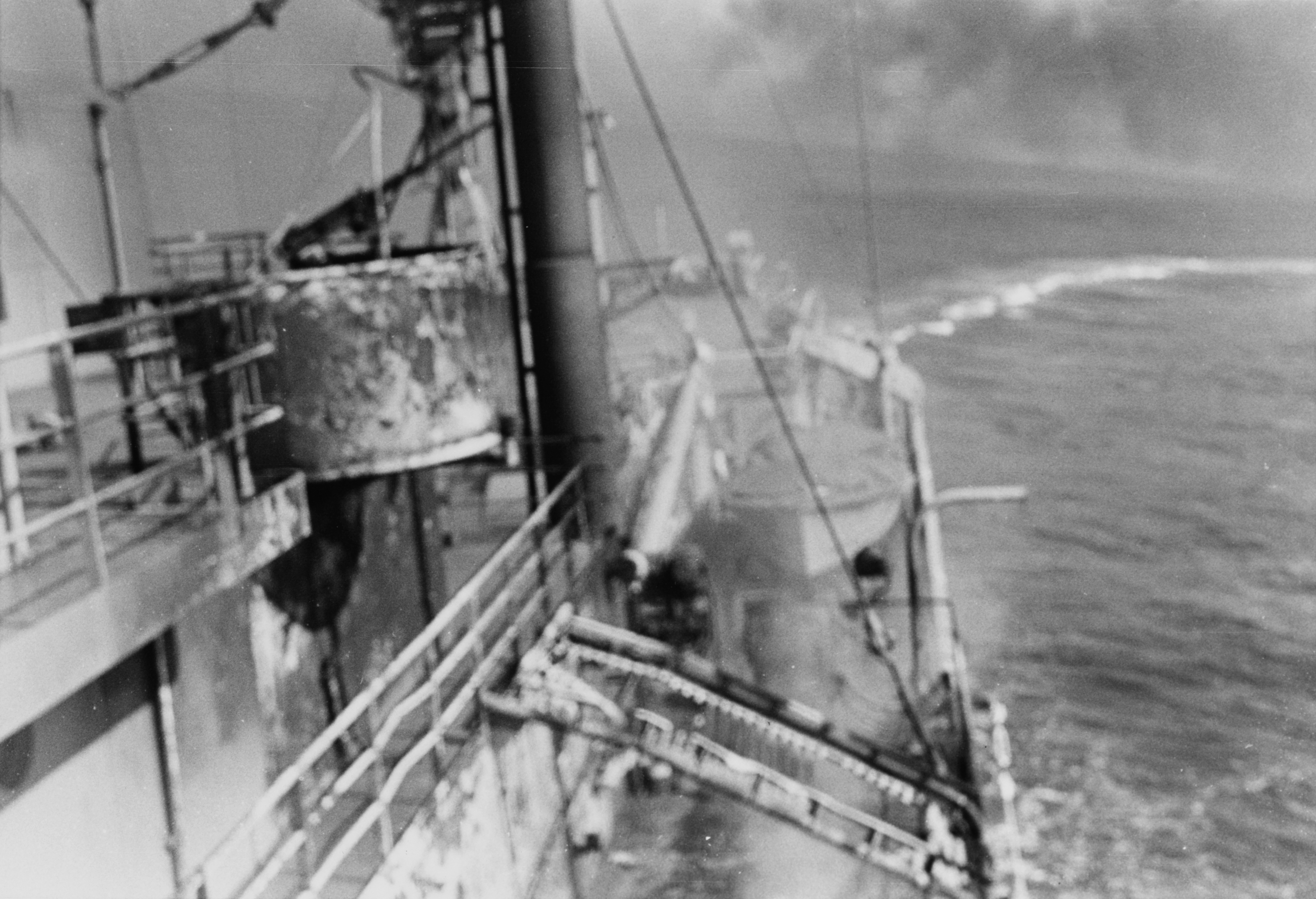
Liberty turns to evade Israeli torpedo boats

As the torpedo boats rapidly approached, McGonagle ordered a sailor to proceed to machine gun Mount 51 and open fire. However, he then noticed that the boats appeared to be flying an Israeli flag, and "realized that there was a possibility of the aircraft having been Israeli and the attack had been conducted in error". McGonagle ordered the man at gun mount 51 to hold fire, but a short burst was fired at the torpedo boats before the man understood the order.

McGonagle observed that machine gun Mount 53 began firing at the center torpedo boat at about the same time gun mount 51 fired, and that its fire was "extremely effective and blanketed the area and the center torpedo boat". Machine gun mount 53 was located on the starboard amidships side, behind the pilot house. McGonagle could not see or "get to mount 53 from the starboard wing of the bridge". So, he "sent Mr. Lucas around the port side of the bridge, around to the skylights, to see if he could tell [Seaman] Quintero, whom [he] believed to be the gunner on Machine gun 53, to hold fire". Lucas "reported back in a few minutes in effect that he saw no one at mount 53". Lucas, who had left the command bridge during the air attack and returned to assist McGonagle, believed that the sound of gunfire was likely from ammunition cooking off, due to a nearby fire. Previously, Lucas had granted a request from Quintero to fire at the torpedo boats, before heat from a nearby fire chased him from gun mount 53. McGonagle later testified, at the Court of Inquiry, that this was likely the "extremely effective" firing event he had observed.

After coming under fire, the torpedo boats returned fire with their cannons, killing Liberty's helmsman. The torpedo boats then launched five torpedoes at the Liberty. At 12:35Z (14:35 local time) one torpedo hit Liberty on the starboard side forward of the superstructure, creating a 39 ft (12 m) wide hole in what had been a cargo hold converted to the ship's research spaces and killing 25 servicemen, almost all of them from the intelligence section, and wounding dozens. It has been said the torpedo hit a major hull frame that absorbed much of the energy; crew members reported that if the torpedo had missed the frame the Liberty would have split in two. The other four torpedoes missed the ship.

The torpedo boats then closed in and strafed the ship's hull with their cannons and machine guns. According to some crewmen, the torpedo boats fired at damage control parties and sailors preparing life rafts for launch. (See disputed details below.) A life raft which floated from the ship was picked up by T-203 and found to bear U.S. Navy markings. T-204 then circled Liberty, and Oren spotted the designation GTR-5, but saw no flag. A CIA report from the following days stated the aircraft attack began at 15:05, and the torpedo boat attack began at 15:25, with the last attack on the Liberty occurred at 15:28, with the Israeli forces terminating their attack after the torpedo hit as they believed the ship was sinking. It took until 15:30 to establish the ship's identity. Shortly before the Liberty's identity was confirmed, the Saratoga launched eight aircraft armed with conventional weapons towards Liberty. After the ship's identity was confirmed, the General Staff was notified and an apology was sent to naval attaché Castle. The aircraft approaching Liberty were recalled to the Saratoga.

=== Aftermath of the attack ===
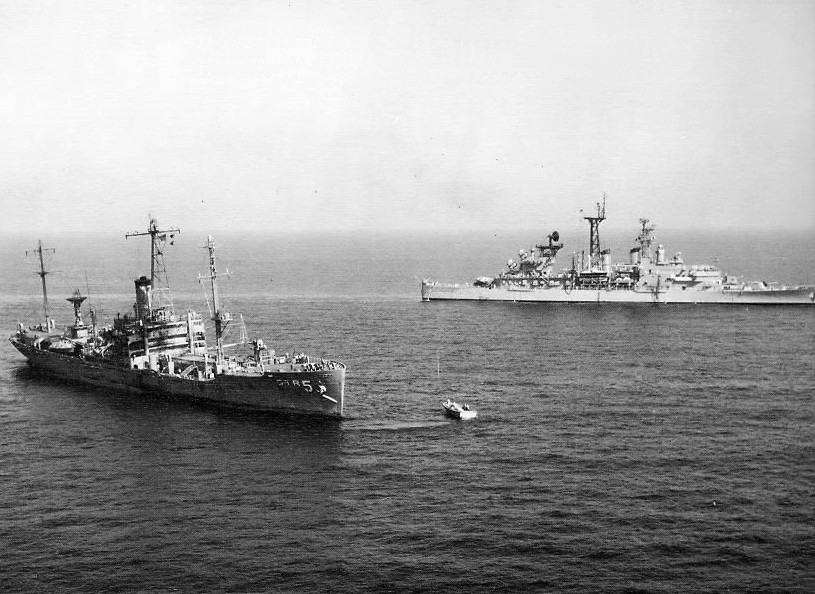
The 6th Fleet flagship, USS Little Rock standing by Liberty

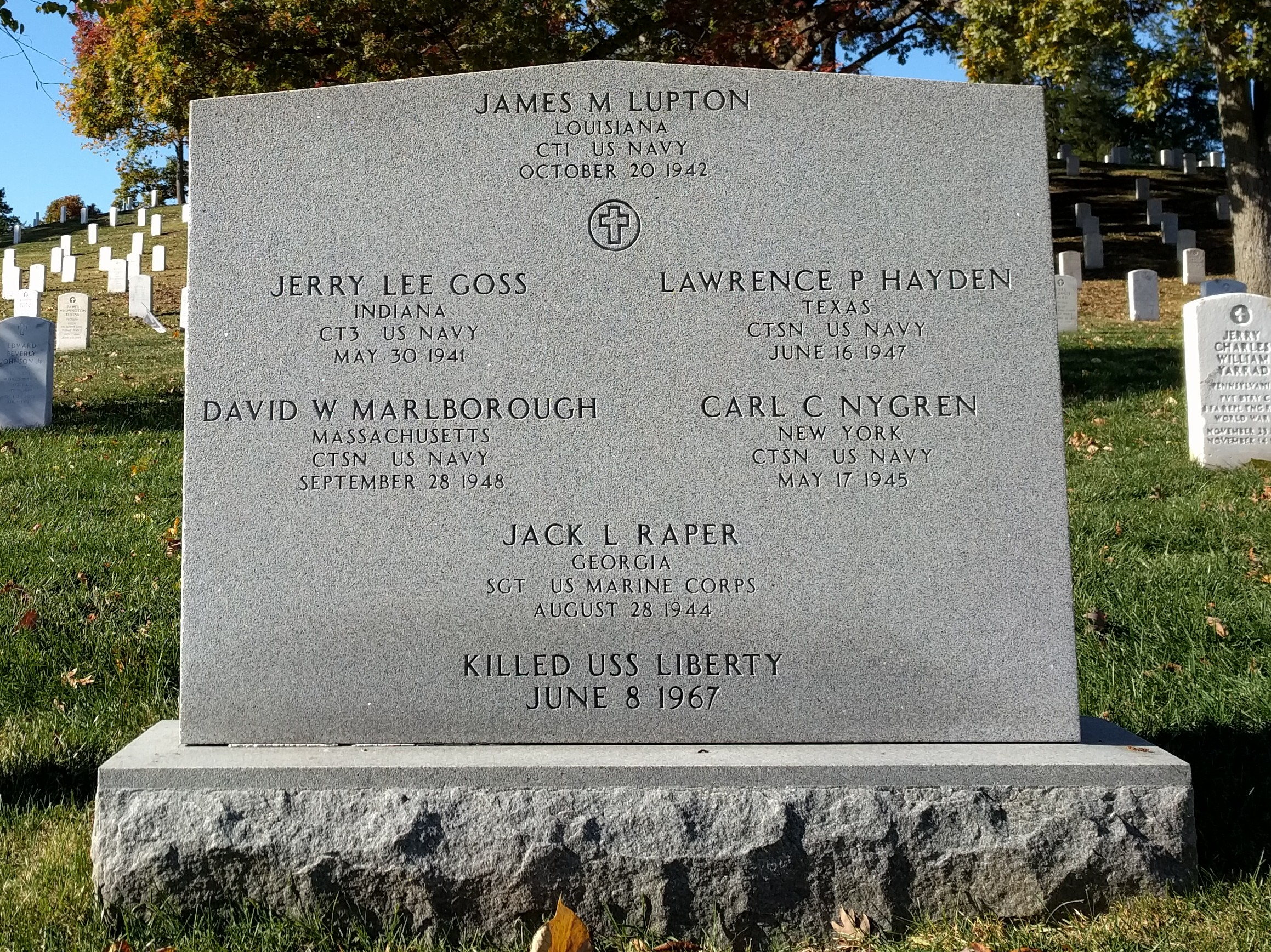
USS LIBERTY Memorial Arlington National Cemetery

According to transcripts of intercepted radio communications, published by the U.S. National Security Agency, at about 14:30, near the beginning of the torpedo boat attack, two IAF helicopters were dispatched to Liberty's location. The helicopters arrived at about 15:10, about 35 minutes after the torpedo hit the ship. After arriving, one of the helicopter pilots was asked by his ground-based controller to verify that the ship was flying an American flag. The helicopters conducted a brief search for crew members of the ship who might have fallen overboard during the air attack. No one was found. The helicopters left the ship at about 15:20.

At about 16:00, two hours after the attack began, Israel informed the U.S. embassy in Tel Aviv that its military forces had mistakenly attacked a U.S. Navy ship. When the ship was "confirmed to be American" the torpedo boats returned at about 16:40 to offer help; it was refused by the Liberty. Later, Israel provided a helicopter to fly U.S. naval attaché Commander Castle to the ship. (pp. 32, 34)

In Washington, President Lyndon B. Johnson had received word from the Joint Chiefs of Staff that Liberty had been torpedoed by an unknown vessel at 09:50 eastern time. Johnson assumed that the Soviets were involved, and hotlined Moscow with news of the attack and the dispatch of jets from Saratoga. He chose not to make any public statements and delegated this task to Phil G. Goulding, who was an assistant Secretary of Defense for Public Affairs at the time. Soon afterward, the Israelis said that they had mistakenly attacked the ship. The Johnson administration conveyed "strong dismay" to Israeli ambassador Avraham Harman. Meanwhile, apologies were soon sent by Israeli prime minister Levi Eshkol, Foreign Minister Abba Eban, and chargé d'affaires Ephraim Evron. Within 48 hours, Israel offered to compensate the victims and their families.

Though Liberty was severely damaged, with a 39 ft wide by 24 ft high (12 m × 7.3 m) hole and a twisted keel, her crew kept her afloat, and she was able to leave the area under her own power. Liberty was first met by Soviet Kildin class guided missile destroyer (DDG 626/4), which offered help. Subsequently, it was met by the destroyers USS Davis and USS Massey, and the cruiser USS Little Rock. Medical personnel were transferred to Liberty, and she was escorted to Malta, where she was given interim repairs. After these were completed in July 1967, Liberty returned to the U.S. She was decommissioned in June 1968 and struck from the Naval Vessel Register. Liberty was transferred to the United States Maritime Administration (MARAD) in December 1970 and sold for scrap in 1973.

From the start, the response to Israeli statements of mistaken identity ranged between frank disbelief to unquestioning acceptance within the administration in Washington. A communication to the Israeli ambassador on 10 June, by Secretary Rusk stated, among other things:

At the time of the attack, the USS Liberty was flying the American flag and its identification was clearly indicated in large white letters and numerals on its hull. ... Experience demonstrates that both the flag and the identification number of the vessel were readily visible from the air ... Accordingly, there is every reason to believe that the USS Liberty was identified, or at least her nationality determined, by Israeli aircraft approximately one hour before the attack. ... The subsequent attack by the torpedo boats, substantially after the vessel was or should have been identified by Israeli military forces, manifests the same reckless disregard for human life.

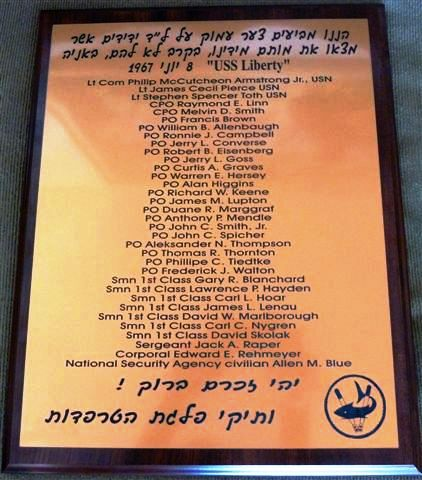
Commemorative plaque in the Israeli Clandestine Immigration and Naval Museum (Note: Translation: "We express deep sorrow for the thirty-four friends who died by our hands in combat they should not have been involved in. May their memory be blessed. Veterans of MTB squadron")

George Lenczowski notes: "It was significant that, in contrast to his secretary of state, President Johnson fully accepted the Israeli version of the tragic incident." He notes that Johnson himself included only one small paragraph about the Liberty in his autobiography, in which he accepted the Israeli explanation, minimized the affair and distorted the number of dead and wounded, by lowering them from 34 to 10 and 171 to 100, respectively. Lenczowski further states: "It seems Johnson was more interested in avoiding a possible confrontation with the Soviet Union, ... than in restraining Israel."

McGonagle received the Medal of Honor, the highest U.S. medal, for his actions. The Medal of Honor is generally presented by the president of the United States in the White House, but this time it was awarded at the Washington Navy Yard by the Secretary of the Navy in an unpublicized ceremony. Other Liberty sailors received decorations for their actions during and after the attack, but most of the award citations omitted mention of Israel as the perpetrator. In 2009, however, a Silver Star was awarded to crewmember Terry Halbardier, who braved machine-gun and cannon fire to repair a damaged antenna that restored the ship's communication; in his award citation Israel was named as the attacker.

=== U.S. government investigations ===
The Court produced evidence that the Israeli armed forces had ample opportunity to identify LIBERTY correctly. The Court had insufficient information before it to make a judgment on the reasons for the decision by Israeli aircraft and motor torpedo boats to attack ... It was not the responsibility of the Court to rule on the culpability of the attackers, and no evidence was heard from the attacking nation.

— U.S. Defense Department's June 28, 1967, News Release concerning the Naval Court of Inquiry into the attack.

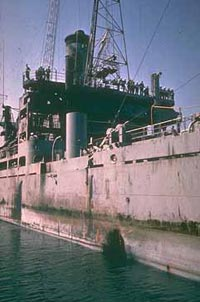
Torpedo damage to Liberty's research compartment (Starboard side)

American inquiries, memoranda, records of testimony, and various reports involving or mentioning the Liberty attack include, but are not limited to, the following:

- U.S. Naval Court of Inquiry of June 1967
- Joint Chief of Staff's Report of June 1967
- CIA Intelligence Memorandums of June 1967
- Clark Clifford Report of July 1967
- Senate Foreign Relations Committee Testimony during hearings of the 1967 Foreign Aid Authorization bill, July 1967
- House Armed Services Committee Investigation of 1971
- The NSA History Report of 1981

The U.S. Naval Court of Inquiry record contains testimony by Liberty crew members, exhibits of attack damage photographs, and various reports. The court concluded that the testimony record revealed "a shallow investigation, plagued by myriad disagreements between the captain and his crew". According to the Navy Court of Inquiry's record of proceedings, four days were spent hearing testimony: two days for fourteen survivors of the attack and several U.S. Navy expert witnesses, and two partial days for two expert U.S. Navy witnesses. No testimony was heard from Israeli personnel involved.

The official U.S. records of the Liberty incident were designated top-secret and closed to the general public. The U.S. government and Israel jointly stated: "That the Israeli attack upon the USS Liberty had been the result of error, and nothing more." Admiral Thomas H. Moorer, Chief of Naval Operations after the Liberty incident, said that he "never believed [the claim by the Israelis] that the attack on the USS Liberty was a case of mistaken identity".

The CIA Memoranda consists of two documents: one dated June 13, 1967, and the other dated June 21, 1967. The June 13 memorandum is an "account of circumstances of the attack ... compiled from all available sources". The June 21 memorandum is a point-by-point analysis of the Israeli inquiry findings of fact. It concludes: "The attack was not made in malice toward the U.S. and was by mistake, but the failure of the IDF Headquarters and the attacking aircraft to identify the Liberty and the subsequent attack by torpedo boats were both incongruous and indicative of gross negligence."

The Clark Clifford report concluded: "The unprovoked attack on the Liberty constitutes a flagrant act of gross negligence for which the Israeli Government should be held completely responsible, and the Israeli military personnel involved should be punished."

The Senate Foreign Relations Committee testimony contains, as an aside during hearings concerning a foreign aid authorization bill, questions and statements from several senators and responses from then Secretary of Defense, Robert McNamara, about the Liberty attack. For the most part, the senators were dismayed about the attack, as expressed by Senator Bourke B. Hickenlooper: "From what I have read I can't tolerate for one minute that this [attack] was an accident." There was concern about obtaining more information on the attack, as expressed by committee chairman J. William Fulbright: "We asked for [the attack investigation report] about two weeks ago and have not received it yet from Secretary Rusk. ... By the time we get to it we will be on some other subject." Secretary McNamara promised fast delivery of the investigation report, "... you will have it in four hours", and concluded his remarks by saying: "I simply want to emphasize that the investigative report does not show any evidence of a conscious intent to attack a U.S. vessel."

The House Armed Services Committee investigation report, "Review of Department of Defense Worldwide Communications" was not an investigation focused on the Liberty attack, although it contains a section describing the flow of communications connected with the Liberty incident.

The National Security Agency (NSA) history report on the event included declassified documents which stated: "Every official interview of numerous Liberty crewmen gave consistent evidence that indeed the Liberty was flying an American flag—and, further, the weather conditions were ideal to ensure its easy observance and identification."

Oliver Kirby, the NSA’s deputy director for operations at the time of the Liberty attack, confirmed that he had read the NSA transcripts of Israeli communication during the attack. He recalled that he had read "They said ‘Yes, it’s U.S, it’s U.S.’ They said it several times, so there wasn’t any doubt in anybody’s mind that they knew it."

The USS Liberty Veterans Association, composed of veterans from the ship, states that U.S. congressional investigations and other U.S. investigations were not actually investigations into the attack, but rather reports using evidence only from the U.S. Navy Court of Inquiry, or investigations unrelated to culpability that involved issues such as communications. In their view, the U.S. Navy Court of Inquiry is the only actual investigation on the incident to date. They say it was hastily conducted, in only ten days, even though the court's president, Rear Admiral Isaac Kidd, said that it would take six months to conduct properly. The inquiry's terms of reference were limited to whether any shortcomings on the part of the Liberty's crew had contributed to the injuries and deaths that resulted from the attack.

=== Israeli government investigations ===
According to an Israel Foreign Ministry letter to the Israeli Embassy in Washington:

In the grave situation that has been created, the only way to soften the result is for us to be able to announce to the U.S. government already today that we intend to prosecute people for this disaster. We have to publicize that in Israel already tonight. ... it is crucial that our announcement about prosecuting those who are to blame be publicized before – I repeat, before – the publication of the American report here.

Two subsequent Israeli inquiry reports and a historical report concluded the attack was conducted because Liberty was confused with an Egyptian vessel and because of failures in communications between Israel and the U.S. The three Israeli reports were:

- Fact Finding Inquiry by Colonel Ram Ron ("Ram Ron Report"—June 1967)
- Preliminary Inquiry (Hearing) by Examining Judge Yeshayahu Yerushalmi ("Yerushalmi Report"—July 1967) (Adjudication of IDF negligence complaints.)
- Historical Report "The Liberty Incident"—IDF History Department report (1982)

In the historical report, it was acknowledged that IDF naval headquarters knew at least three hours before the attack that the ship was "an electromagnetic audio-surveillance ship of the U.S. Navy" but concluded that this information had simply "gotten lost, never passed along to the ground controllers who directed the air attack nor to the crews of the three Israeli torpedo boats".

The Israeli government said that three crucial errors were made: the refreshing of the status board (removing the ship's classification as American, so that the later shift did not see it identified), the erroneous identification of the ship as an Egyptian vessel, and the lack of notification from the returning aircraft informing Israeli headquarters of markings on the front of the hull (markings that would not be found on an Egyptian ship). As a common root of these problems, Israel blamed the combination of alarm and fatigue experienced by the Israeli forces at that point of the war when pilots were severely overworked.

After conducting his own fact-finding inquiry and reviewing evidence, Judge Yerushalmi's decision was: "I have not discovered any deviation from the standard of reasonable conduct which would justify committal of anyone for trial." In other words, he found no negligence by any IDF member associated with the attack.

== Ongoing controversy and unresolved questions ==
Some intelligence and military officials dispute Israel's explanation. In 1991, Dean Rusk, U.S. Secretary of State at the time of the incident, wrote:

I was never satisfied with the Israeli explanation. Their sustained attack to disable and sink Liberty precluded an assault by accident or some trigger-happy local commander. Through diplomatic channels we refused to accept their explanations. I didn't believe them then, and I don't believe them to this day. The attack was outrageous.

Retired naval Lieutenant Commander James Ennes, a junior officer (and off-going Officer of the Deck) on Liberty's bridge at the time of the attack, authored a book titled Assault on the Liberty describing the incident and saying, among other things, that the attack was deliberate. Ennes and Joe Meadors, also a survivor of the attack, run a website about the incident. Meadors states that the classification of the attack as deliberate is the official policy of the USS Liberty Veterans Association, to which survivors and other former crew members belong. Other survivors run several additional websites. Citing Ennes's book, Lenczowski notes: Liberty's personnel received firm orders not to say anything to anybody about the attack, and the naval inquiry was conducted in such a way as to earn it the name of "coverup".

In 2002, Captain Ward Boston, JAGC, U.S. Navy, senior counsel for the Court of Inquiry, told the Navy Times that the naval court was a politicized sham with conclusions preordained to exonerate Israel. In 2004, in response to the publication of A. Jay Cristol's book The Liberty Incident, which Boston said was an "insidious attempt to whitewash the facts", Boston prepared and signed an affidavit in which he stated that President Johnson and secretary of defense Robert McNamara had ordered Admiral Kidd, that the assault be ruled an accident, and to reach the conclusion "that the attack was a case of 'mistaken identity' despite 'overwhelming evidence to the contrary.'" In 2004, Boston repeated his assertion before a State Department conference about the Six-Day War. Cristol wrote about Boston's professional qualifications and integrity, on page 149 of his book:

Boston brought two special assets in addition to his skill as a Navy lawyer. He had been a naval aviator in World War II and therefore had insight beyond that of one qualified only in the law. Also, Kidd knew him as a man of integrity. On an earlier matter Boston had been willing to bump heads with Kidd when Boston felt it was more important to do the right thing than to curry favor with the senior who would write his fitness report.

— A. Jay Cristol, The Liberty Incident

In his 2004 affidavit Boston stated:

The evidence was clear. Both Admiral Kidd and I believed with certainty that this attack, which killed 34 American sailors and injured 172 others, was a deliberate effort to sink an American ship and murder its entire crew. Each evening, after hearing testimony all day, we often spoke our private thoughts concerning what we had seen and heard. I recall Admiral Kidd repeatedly referring to the Israeli forces responsible for the attack as "murderous bastards." It was our shared belief, based on the documentary evidence and testimony we received first hand, that the Israeli attack was planned and deliberate, and could not possibly have been an accident. I am certain that the Israeli pilots that undertook the attack, as well as their superiors who had ordered the attack, were well aware that the ship was American. I saw the flag, which had visibly identified the ship as American, riddled with bullet holes, and heard testimony that made it clear that the Israelis intended there be no survivors...I know from personal conversations I had with Admiral Kidd that President Lyndon Johnson and Secretary of Defense Robert McNamara ordered him to conclude that the attack was a case of "mistaken identity" despite overwhelming evidence to the contrary." He also confirmed that the court of inquiry transcript had been altered before becoming part of the official record, "I know that the Court of Inquiry transcript that has been released to the public is not the same one that I certified and sent off to Washington. I know this because it was necessary, due to the exigencies of time, to hand correct and initial a substantial number of pages. I have examined the released version of the transcript and I did not see any pages that bore my hand corrections and initials. Also, the original did not have any deliberately blank pages, as the released version does. Finally, the testimony of Lt. Painter concerning the deliberate machine gunning of the life rafts by the Israeli torpedo boat crews, which I distinctly recall being given at the Court of Inquiry and included in the original transcript, is now missing and has been excised.

Cristol said he believes that Boston is not telling the truth about Kidd's views and any pressure from the U.S. government. Cristol, who also served as an officer of the U.S. Navy's Judge Advocate General, suggests that Boston was responsible in part for the original conclusions of the Court of Inquiry and, that by later declaring that they were false, Boston has admitted to "lying under oath". Cristol also notes that Boston's statements about pressure on Kidd were hearsay, and that Kidd was not alive to confirm or deny them and that Boston did not maintain, prior to his affidavit and comments related to it, that Kidd spoke of such instructions to Boston or to others. Cristol also provides a handwritten 1991 letter from Admiral Kidd that, according to Cristol, "suggest that Ward Boston has either a faulty memory or a vivid imagination". According to James Ennes, however, Admiral Kidd urged Ennes and his group to keep pressing for an open congressional probe.

The following arguments, found in official reports or other sources, were published to support the hypothesis that the attack was due to mistaken identity:

- Accidents and mistakes do occur in wartime. Journalist Ze'ev Schiff gave an example of a friendly fire incident where Israeli aircraft had bombed an Israeli armored column south of the West Bank town of Jenin the day before the attack on the Liberty. Also given as an example was a similar incident that took place during the Suez Crisis in 1956, when Israeli aircraft attacked and damaged the British frigate HMS Crane after mistaking it for an Egyptian warship, at a time when Britain and Israel were fighting together.
- The incident took place during the Six-Day War when Israel was engaged in battles with two Arab countries and preparing to attack a third, creating an environment where mistakes and confusion were prevalent. For example, at 11:45, a few hours before the attack, there was a large explosion on the shores of El-Arish followed by black smoke, probably caused by the destruction of an ammunition dump by retreating Egyptian forces. The Israeli army thought the area was being bombarded, and that an unidentified ship offshore was responsible.
- As the torpedo boats approached, Liberty opened fire on them. McGonagle said that he felt sure the torpedo boat captains believed they were under fire from the Liberty. Ensign Lucas, testified that he gave permission for the firing of the 03 level machine gun after the torpedo boats began firing at Liberty. Later, when the gun was unmanned, heat from a nearby fire apparently caused machine gun rounds at the gun to explode.
- Admiral Shlomo Erell, head of the Israeli Navy in 1967, stated that no successful argument of benefit has been presented for Israel purposely attacking an American warship, especially considering the high cost of predictable complications that would follow an attack on a powerful ally. He also pointed out that Israel notified the American embassy immediately after the attack.

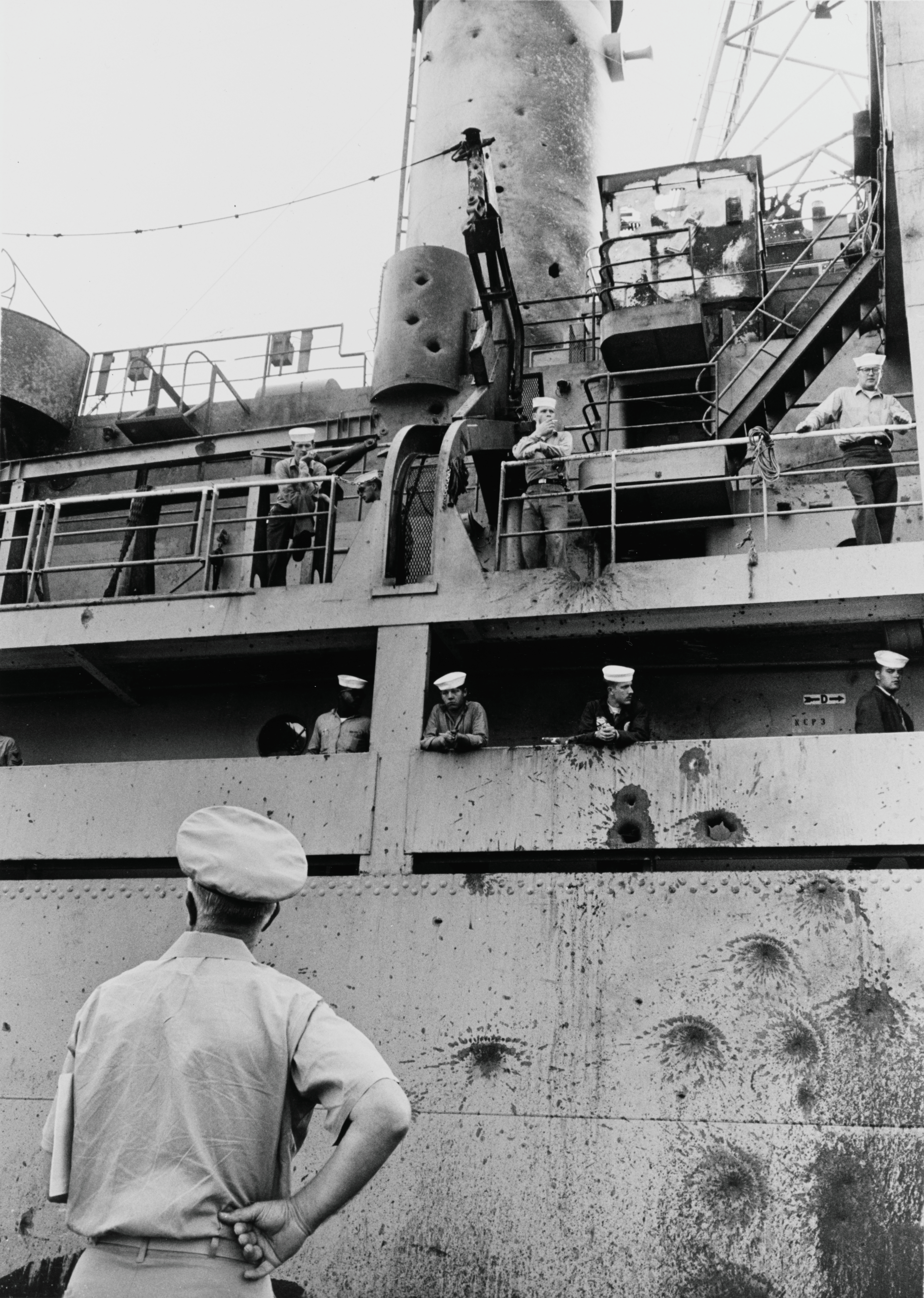
Amidships starboard hull and superstructure attack damage

Several books and the BBC documentary USS Liberty: Dead in the Water argued that Liberty was attacked in order to prevent the U.S. from knowing about the forthcoming attack in the Golan Heights, which would violate a cease-fire to which Israel's government had agreed. However, Syria did not accept the cease fire until 9 June, after the attack on Liberty. Russian author Joseph Daichman, in his book History of the Mossad, states Israel was justified in attacking the Liberty. Israel knew that American radio signals were intercepted by the Soviet Union and that the Soviets would certainly inform Egypt of the fact that, by moving troops to the Golan Heights, Israel had left the Egyptian border undefended.

Lenczowski notes that while the Israeli decision to "attack and destroy" the ship "may appear puzzling", the explanation seems to be found in Liberty's nature and its task to monitor communications from both sides in the war zone. He writes that timely knowledge of their decision to invade Syria and preparatory moves toward it "might have frustrated Israeli designs for the conquest of Syria's Golan Heights" and, in the sense of Ennes's accusations, provides "a plausible thesis that Israel deliberately decided to incapacitate the signals-collecting American ship and leave no one alive to tell the story of the attack".

The U.S. ambassador to Israel, Barbour, had reported on the day of the Liberty attack that he "would not be surprised" by an Israeli attack on Syria, and the IDF Intelligence chief told a White House aide then in Israel that "there still remained the Syria problem and perhaps it would be necessary to give Syria a blow".

The 1981 book Weapons by Russell Warren Howe says that Liberty was accompanied by the Polaris ballistic missile-armed Lafayette-class submarine USS Andrew Jackson, which filmed the entire episode through its periscope but was unable to provide assistance. (Note: Several Liberty crew members testified that they had briefly seen a periscope during the attack. In 1988, the Lyndon Johnson Library declassified and released a document from the Liberty archive with the "Top Secret—Eyes Only" security caveat (Document #12C sanitized and released 21DEC88 under review case 86–199). This "Memorandum for the Record" dated 10 April 1967 reported a briefing of the "303 Committee" by General Ralph D. Steakley. According to the memo, General Steakley "briefed the committee on a sensitive DOD project known as FRONTLET 615", which is identified in a handwritten note on the original memorandum as "submarine within U.A.R. waters". Further Freedom of Information Act requests returned no information on any project called "FRONTLET 615". In February 1997, a senior member of the crew of the submarine USS Amberjack told James Ennes that he had watched the attack through the periscope and took pictures. According to the official ship's history from the Department of Defense, Amberjack's mission between 23 April and 24 July was reconnaissance within U.A.R. waters. When contacted, four crewmen stated that they were so close to Liberty when it came under attack that some of the crew believed Amberjack itself was under depth charge attack. August Hubal, Captain of the Amberjack, insists that the vessel was 100 mi (160 km) from the Liberty and when told the crew believed they were closer replied "They must be mistaken". On 2 July 2003, as a result of a lawsuit using the Freedom of Information Act by Joel Leyden on behalf of the Israel News Agency requesting any evidence that the U.S. submarine Amberjack had gathered by means of its periscope, the National Security Agency stated that there had been "no radio intercepts made by the U.S. submarine Amberjack". James Ennes believes that if the submarine photography exists, it should show that the ship's flag was clearly visible to the attacking fighters and torpedo boats.)

James Bamford, a former ABC News producer, says in his 2001 book Body of Secrets, that Israel deliberately attacked Liberty to prevent the discovery of what he described as war crimes, including the killing of Egyptian prisoners of war by the IDF that he alleges was taking place around the same time in the nearby town of El-Arish. According to CAMERA, his claim that 400 Egyptians were executed has been cast into doubt since reporters present in the town claimed that there had been a large battle and this was the main cause of casualties. Bamford also stated that eyewitness Gabi Bron had said he saw 150 people executed by Israeli troops at El-Arish. However, Gabi Bron claimed to have only seen 5 people executed by Israeli troops.

The press release for the BBC documentary film Dead in the Water states that new recorded and other evidence suggests the attack was a "daring ploy by Israel to fake an Egyptian attack" to give America a reason to enter the war against Egypt. It stated that President Lyndon B. Johnson launched allegedly nuclear-armed aircraft targeted against Cairo from a U.S. aircraft carrier in the Mediterranean. The aircraft were recalled only just in time, when it was clear the Liberty had not been sunk and that Israel had carried out the attack. An information source for the aircraft being nuclear-armed, James Ennes later stated:

It is clear that I was mistaken about the aircraft involved, as F4s do not carry nuclear weapons. Others tell me that the aircraft that were launched carried Bullpup missiles, which might easily be mistaken for nuclear bombs. And we learned much later that the USS America was involved in a nuclear weapons loading drill at the very time the ship learned of the attack on the Liberty and that this drill is one factor that delayed America's response to our call for help. It is also possible that those were the weapons seen by our sources.

Also confusing this issue is an oral history report from the American Embassy in Cairo, now in the LBJ Library, which notes that the Embassy received an urgent message from Washington warning that Cairo was about to be bombed by U.S. forces, presumably in mistaken retaliation for the USS Liberty attack. That strange message was never explained or cancelled.

The video also reports hearsay of a covert alliance of U.S. and Israeli intelligence agencies.

Admiral Thomas H. Moorer, former Chairman of the Joint Chiefs of Staff and a critic of the official U.S. government version of events, chaired a non-governmental investigation into the attack on the Liberty in 2003. The committee, which included former U.S. ambassador to Saudi Arabia James E. Akins, found Israel to be culpable and suggested several reasons for Israel's actions, including that Israel meant to sink the ship and blame Egypt in order to bring the U.S. into the Six-Day War.

According to John Loftus and Mark Aarons in their book, The Secret War Against the Jews, Liberty was attacked because the Israelis knew that the ship's mission was to monitor radio signals from Israeli troops and pass troop movement information to the Egyptians.

The USS Liberty incident is frequently referenced in antisemitic conspiracy theories, which Cristol said are spread to damage Israel–United States relations. He said that conspiracy theorists "don't care what the facts are; they just want to present the idea that Israel did a dirty deed against the US". A Southern Poverty Law Center extremism monitor, Heidi Beirich, described the incident as a "rallying cry" for antisemites, and the scholar Spencer Sunshine called it a "perennial favorite" target of neo-Nazis. Iranian government-affiliated social media accounts have reportedly promoted Liberty conspiracy theories to incite hatred of Israel and Jews. In 2018, the celebrities Brett Favre and Andy Dick issued apologies after a neo-Nazi group, the Goyim Defense League, tricked them into recording Cameo videos containing coded antisemitic messages referencing the Liberty. Representative Paul Gosar (R-AZ) referred to the incident as a false flag operation by Israel and the United States Intelligence Community in a 2024 newsletter, which drew criticism from the Anti-Defamation League.

In 2026, Republican congressman Thomas Massie brought survivors to the House of Congress to demand a new probe into the incident.

== NSA tapes and subsequent developments ==
The NSA reported that there had been no radio intercepts of the attack made by the Liberty herself, nor had there been any radio intercepts made by the U.S. submarine USS Amberjack. Within an hour of learning that the Liberty had been torpedoed, the director of the NSA, LTG Marshall S. Carter, sent a message to all intercept sites requesting a search of communications that might be connected to the attack or any reaction to it. The only such communication reported was intercepted by a U.S. Navy EC-121 aircraft that flew near the attacks from 14:30 to 15:27, Sinai time (12:30 to 13:27 Z); it had collected voice conversations between two Israeli helicopter pilots and the control tower at Hatzor Airfield following the attack on the Liberty.

On 2 July 2003, the NSA released copies of these recordings and their translations and summaries. These revelations were elicited as part of a Freedom of Information Act lawsuit by Florida bankruptcy judge and retired naval aviator Jay Cristol. Two linguists who were aboard the EC-121 when the recordings were made said separately that at least two additional tapes were made that had been withheld. English language translations of the released tapes indicate that the Israelis spoke of hitting an Egyptian supply ship even after the end of attack. The rescue helicopters relayed urgent requests that the rescuers ask the first survivor pulled out of the water what his nationality is; there was discussion as to whether the survivors would speak Arabic.

A summary of the NSA-translated tapes indicates that at 12:34Z Hatzor air control began directing two Israeli Air Force helicopters to an Egyptian warship, to rescue its crew: "This ship has now been identified as Egyptian." The helicopters arrived near the ship at about 13:03Z: "I see a big vessel, near it are three small vessels ..." At 13:08Z, Hatzor air control indicated concern about the nationality of the ship's crew: "The first matter to clarify is to find out what their nationality is." At 13:10Z, one of the helicopter pilots asked the nearby torpedo boats' Division Commander about the meaning of the ship's hull number: "GTR5 is written on it. Does this mean something?" The response was: "Negative, it doesn't mean anything." At 13:12Z, one of the helicopter pilots was asked by air control: "Did you clearly identify an American flag?" No answer appears in the transcript, but the air controller then says: "We request that you make another pass and check once more if this is really an American flag." Again, no response appears in the transcript. At about 13:14Z, the helicopters were directed to return home.

On 10 October 2003, The Jerusalem Post ran an interview with Yiftah Spector, one of the pilots who participated in the attack. Spector said the ship was assumed to be Egyptian, stating that: "there was positively no flag". The interview also contains the transcripts of the Israeli communications about the Liberty. However, the journalist who transcribed the tapes for that article, Arieh O'Sullivan, later confirmed that "the Israeli Air Force tapes he listened to contained blank spaces". The Liberty's survivors contradict Spector. According to subsequently declassified NSA documents: "Every official interview of numerous Liberty crewmen gave consistent evidence that the Liberty was flying an American flag—and, further, the weather conditions were ideal to ensure its easy observance and identification."

On 8 June 2005, the USS Liberty Veterans Association filed a "Report of War Crimes Committed Against the U.S. Military, June 8, 1967" with the Department of Defense (DoD). They say Department of Defense Directive 2311.01E requires the Department of Defense to conduct a thorough investigation of the allegations contained in their report. DoD has responded that a new investigation would not be conducted since a Navy Court of Inquiry had already investigated the facts and circumstances surrounding the attack.

As of 2006, the NSA had yet to declassify "boxes and boxes" of Liberty documents. Numerous requests under both declassification directives and the Freedom of Information Act are pending with various agencies including the NSA, Central Intelligence Agency, and Defense Intelligence Agency. "On 8 June 2007, the National Security Agency released hundreds of additional declassified documents on the Israeli attack on the USS Liberty, a communications interception vessel, on 8 June 1967."

On 2 October 2007, The Chicago Tribune published a special report into the attack, containing numerous previously unreported quotes from former military personnel with first-hand knowledge of the incident. Many of these quotes directly contradict the NSA's position that it never intercepted the communications of the attacking Israeli pilots, saying that not only did transcripts of those communications exist, but also that it showed the Israelis knew they were attacking an American naval vessel.

Two diplomatic cables written by Avraham Harman, Israel's ambassador in Washington, to Abba Eban, Israel's minister of foreign affairs, have been declassified by Israel and obtained from the Israel State Archive. The first cable, sent five days after the attack, informs Eban that a U.S. informant told Harman there was "clear proof that from a certain stage the pilot discovered the identity of the ship and continued the attack anyway". The second cable, sent three days later, added that the White House is "very angry" because "the Americans probably have findings showing that our pilots indeed knew that the ship was American". Documents of the Israeli General Staff meetings, declassified in October 2008, show no discussion of a planned attack on an American ship.

On 30 October 2014, Al Jazeera broadcast a documentary film containing recent first-hand accounts by several survivors of the incident. The documentary argues that Israel knew the ship was American, and planned to blame its sinking on Egypt in order to draw the United States into the war on the Israeli side.

== Details in dispute ==
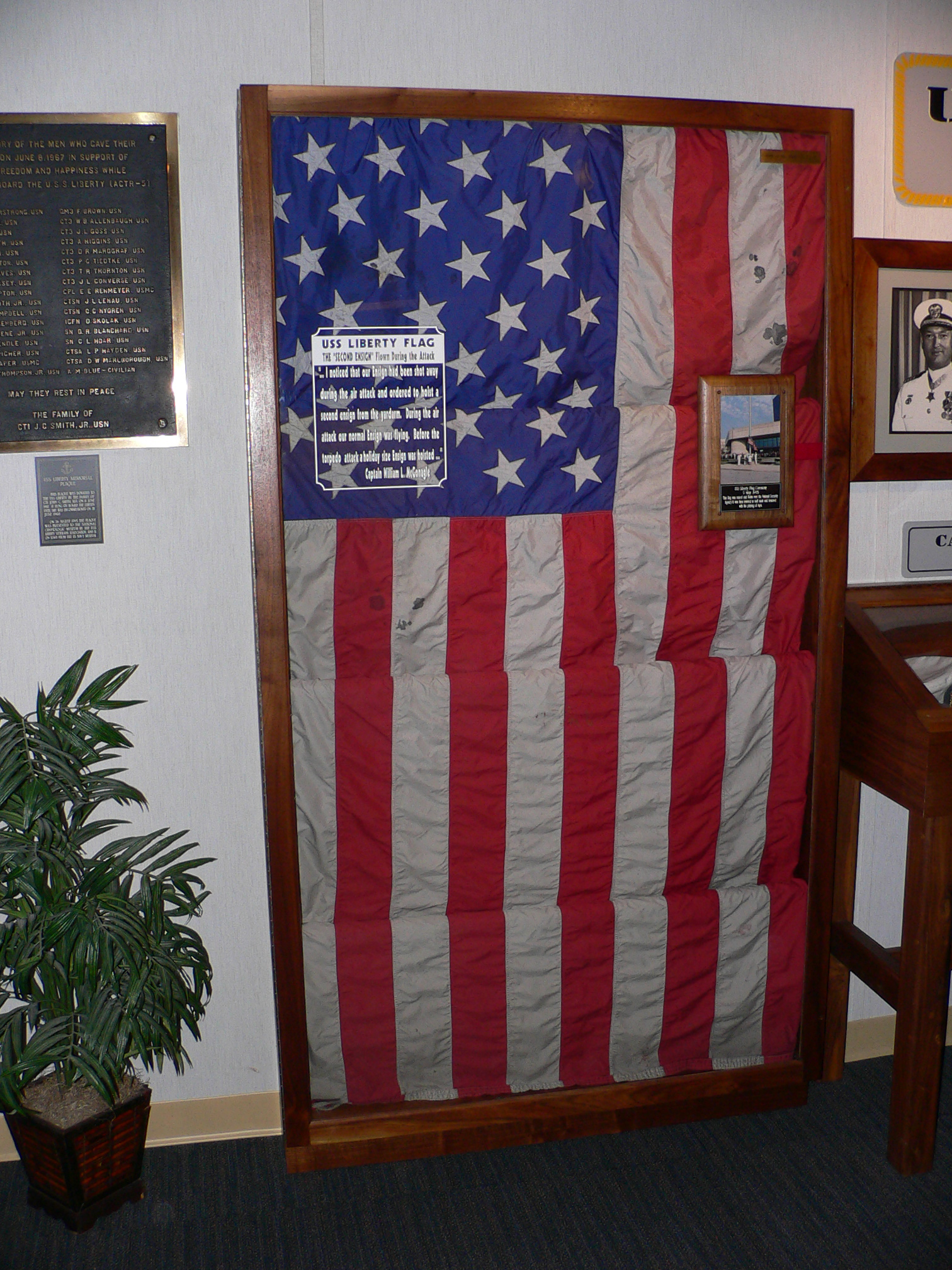
The "Second Ensign" flown during the attack. Israel Defense Forces' investigative reports say their pilots and torpedo boat commander saw no flags during the attack.

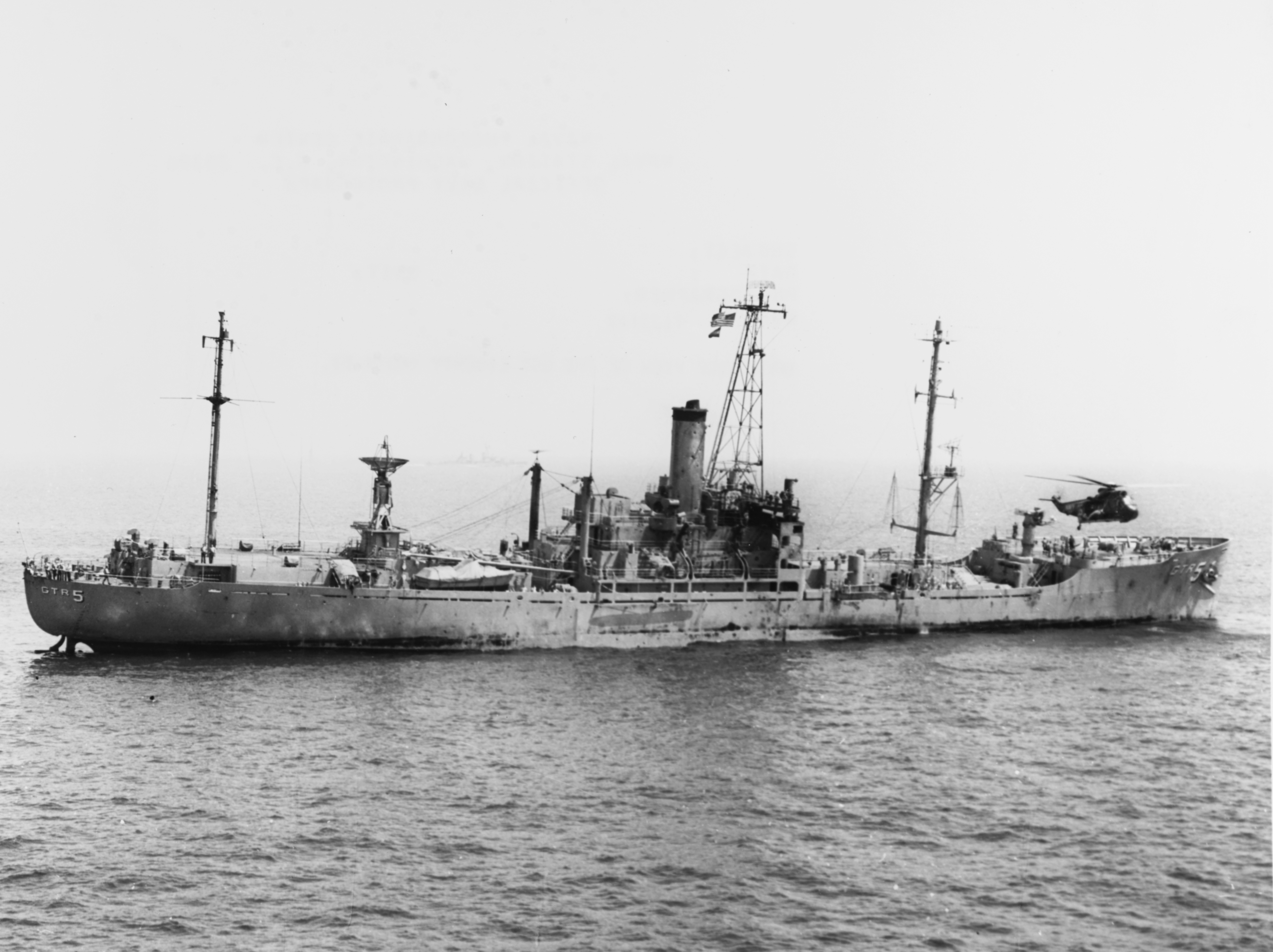
Damaged USS Liberty one day after attack (9 June 1967)

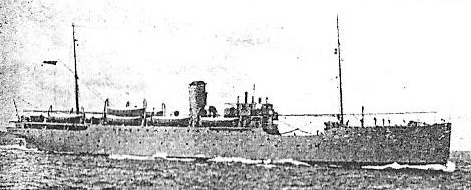
An auxiliary ship of the Egyptian Navy

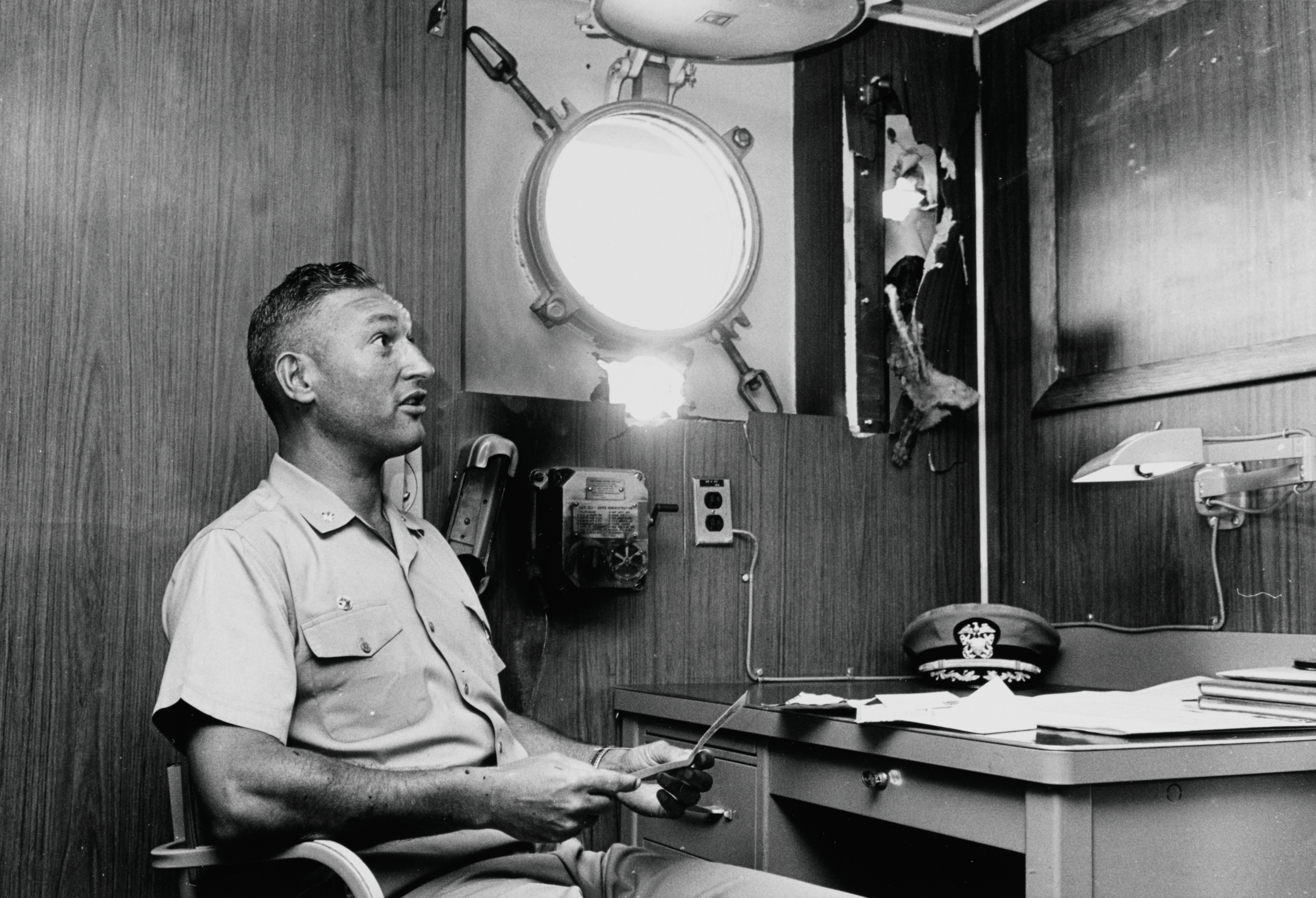
Commander W.L. McGonagle in his damaged cabin after the attack

Various details regarding the attack are the subject of controversy:

- Visibility of American flag: The official Israeli reports say that the reconnaissance and fighter aircraft pilots, and the torpedo boat captains did not see any flag on the Liberty. Official American reports say that the Liberty was flying her American flag before, during and after the attack; the only exception being a brief period in which one flag had been shot down and was replaced with a larger flag. The helicopters sent to the attack site to provide assistance after the air attack noticed an American flag flying from the ship almost immediately upon their arrival at the attack site.
- Identification markings: Liberty bore an eight-foot-high "5" and a four-foot-high "GTR" along either bow, clearly displaying her hull (or "pennant") number (AGTR-5) to indicate she was a technical research ship. She also had 18-inch (460 mm)-high letters spelling the vessel's name across her stern. These markings were not cursive Arabic script but in the Latin alphabet. Israeli pilots initially said they were primarily concerned with ensuring the ship was not an Israeli warship and that they ended the air attack when they noticed the Latin alphabet markings.
- Ship's identification known during attack: A James Bamford book published in 2001 said that secret NSA intercepts indicate that Israeli pilots had full knowledge they were attacking a U.S. vessel.
- Effort for identification: The American crew says the attacking aircraft did not make identification runs over Liberty, but began to strafe immediately. Israel says several identification passes were made. The Naval Court of Enquiry, based on the Israeli timeline of events, found: "One may infer from the fact that within a period of approximately 15 minutes, the request was transmitted, received, a command decision made, aircraft dispatched, and the attack launched, that no significant time was expended in an effort to identify the ship from the air before the attack was launched."
- Motive: James Bamford, among others, says one possible motive was to prevent the United States from eavesdropping on Israeli military activities and monitoring the events taking place in nearby Gaza. In a study of the incident concluding that there was insufficient evidence to support either accidental or deliberate attack, Colonel Peyton E. Smith wrote: "The attack was most likely deliberate for reasons far too sensitive to be disclosed by the U.S. (or) Israeli government and that the truth may never be known". Author and former crew member James M. Ennes theorized, in the epilogue of his book Assault on the Liberty, that the motive was to prevent the ship's crew from monitoring radio traffic that might reveal Israel as the aggressor in its impending invasion of Syria, which the White House opposed.
- Israeli aircraft markings: The USS Liberty Veterans Association says that the attacking Israeli aircraft were not marked, but a crewmember recalls watching a Jewish officer cry on seeing the blue Star of David on their fuselages. The torpedo boats that attacked Liberty flew the Israeli flag.
- Jamming as a motive: A UPI report published by The Washington Star on 19 September 1977 indicated CIA documents obtained by the American Palestine Committee suggested Israeli defense minister Moshe Dayan ordered the attack, because Liberty was jamming Israeli communications. A CIA document dated 23 June 1967 said Liberty had been jamming Israeli communications. Another CIA document dated 9 November 1967 quoted unidentified agency informants as saying Dayan personally ordered the attack; the CIA said the documents were "unevaluated for accuracy".
- Israeli ships' actions after the torpedo hit: Officers and men of Liberty say that after the torpedo attack and the abandon ship order, motor torpedo boats strafed the ship's topside with automatic gunfire preventing men from escaping from below, and either machine-gunned or confiscated the empty life rafts that had been set afloat. The IDF says that Liberty was not fired upon after the torpedo attack and that a rescue raft was fished from the water while searching for survivors.
- Israeli offers of help: The Liberty's captain, several of the Liberty's crewmen and the Israelis stated that help was offered, but at different times. The Liberty's Deck Log, signed by the captain, has an entry at 15:03 stating: "One MTB returned to the ship and signaled, 'Do you need help.' " The Israel Defense Forces's History Report and the Ram Ron report both say that help was offered at 16:40 and the offer was rejected.

== See also ==
- Six-Day War
- Israeli war crimes
- Ras Sedr massacre
- The Attack on the Liberty: The Untold Story of Israel's Deadly 1967 Assault on a U.S. Spy Ship
- Attacks on the United States
- USS Panay incident
- Clark Clifford § USS Liberty incident
