= The Reporter =

The Reporter may refer to:

== Periodicals ==
=== United States ===
- Daily Reporter (Greenfield), a newspaper in Greenfield, Indiana
- The APF Reporter, a magazine published by the Alicia Patterson Foundation.
- The Beach Reporter, a weekly newspaper serving the Beach Cities of Los Angeles's South Bay
- The Chicago Reporter, a monthly periodical based in Chicago focusing on poverty and race issues
- The Daily Reporter, a newspaper in Columbus, Ohio
- The Daily Reporter, original name of Reporter Times, based in Martinsville, Indiana and covering Morgan County.
- The Daily Reporter, a newspaper in Milwaukee, Wisconsin
- The Daily Reporter, a newspaper in Spencer, Iowa
- The Daily Reporter (Coldwater), a newspaper in Coldwater, Michigan
- The Hollywood Reporter, an entertainment newspaper
- The Hudson Reporter, a chain of newspapers serving Hudson County, New Jersey
- The Lebanon Reporter, a daily newspaper serving Lebanon, Indiana and adjacent portions of Boone County, Indiana
- The News Reporter, a broadsheet semi-weekly (Monday and Thursday) newspaper based in Whiteville, North Carolina
- The Reporter, a publication of the United States Air Force Judge Advocate General's Corps
- The Reporter (Fond du Lac, Wisconsin), a newspaper in Fond du Lac, Wisconsin
- The Reporter (Lansdale), a newspaper in Lansdale, Pennsylvania
- The Reporter (magazine), American magazine published from 1949 to 1968
- The Reporter (newspaper), a weekly community newspaper based in the Chicago suburb of Palos Heights
- The Reporter (Vacaville), a newspaper in Vacaville, California

=== Australia ===
- Box Hill Reporter or The Reporter, defunct newspaper in Victoria

=== Belize ===
- The Reporter (Belize), a newspaper in Belize

=== Ethiopia ===
- Ethiopian Reporter, an English and Amharic-language newspaper in Ethiopia owned by MCC (Media Communication Center)

=== Northern Ireland ===
- The Impartial Reporter, a newspaper based in Enniskillen, County Fermanagh, Northern Ireland

=== Taiwan ===
- The Reporter (Taiwan), an investigative digital media outlet in Taiwan

== Other uses ==
- Reporter TV, an Indian television news channel in Malayalam
- The Reporter, a Nicholas Wright play about journalist David James Mossman
- The Reporter (film), a 2012 Malayalam thriller film
- The Reporter (TV series), a 1964 American television series that aired for 13 weeks on CBS
- "The Reporter" (Parks and Recreation), an episode of the American comedy television series Parks and Recreation

== See also ==
- Reporter (disambiguation)
- El Reportero (disambiguation)
- The Reporters (disambiguation)
