= A. Jay Cristol =

American judge and naval officer (1929–2025)

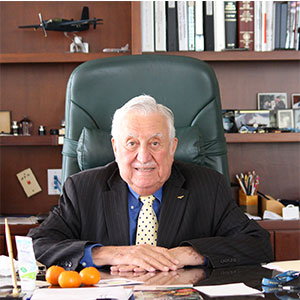

Chief Judge of the United States Bankruptcy Court for the Southern District of Florida
- In office October 1, 1993 – January 13, 2023
- Preceded by: Sidney M. Weaver
- Succeeded by: Robert A. Mark

Judge of the United States Bankruptcy Court for the Southern District of Florida
- In office April 17, 1985 – October 1, 1993
- Preceded by: Joseph A. Gassen

Personal details
- Born: A. Jay Cristol; September 25, 1929 Fountain Hill, Pennsylvania, U.S.
- Died: 21 October 2024 (aged 95)
- Spouse: Eleanor Rubin
- Education: University of Miami (BA, JD, PhD)

Military service
- Branch/service: United States Navy
- Years of service: 1951-1988
- Rank: Captain
- Unit: Navy Reserve; Naval Judge Advocate General Corps
- Battles/wars: Korean War; Vietnam War

A. Jay Cristol (September 25, 1929 – October 21, 2024) was an American judge, poet, author, pilot, and lecturer on naval warfare. He served as a special assistant attorney general of Florida from 1959 to 1965 and as a trustee in bankruptcy from 1977 to 1985. He was appointed judge to the United States Bankruptcy Court for the Southern District of Florida in April 1985 and served as the bankruptcy court's chief judge until his retirement in January 2023.

Cristol served as a U.S. Navy aviator and a captain in the U.S. Naval Reserve with 38 years of service in the diverse roles of both a carrier pilot and a Judge Advocate General Corps (JAG) lawyer.

== Higher education ==
Cristol received his B.A. degree from the University of Miami in 1958 and his J.D. degree, cum laude, from the University of Miami School of Law in 1959, where he was research editor of the law review and recipient of other honors. (Cristol returned to the school in the late 1980s, and received his PhD from the Graduate School of International Studies at the University of Miami on May 9, 1997.)

== Navy career ==
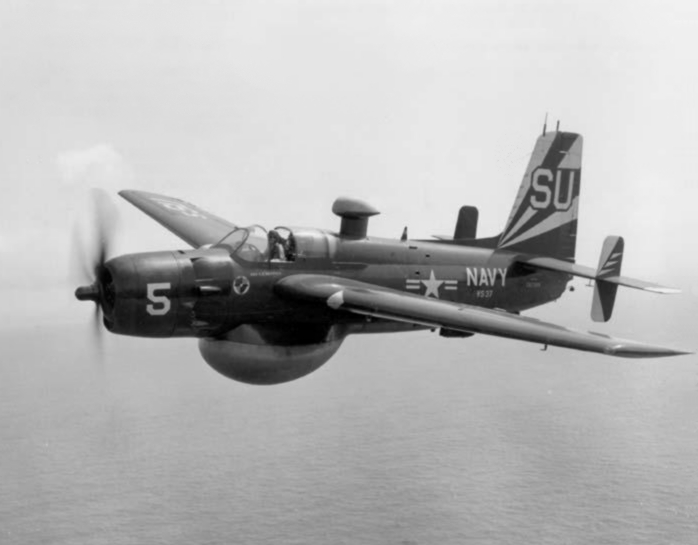
Grumman AF Guardian AF-2W

Cristol made his first flight in a Piper J-3 Cub on Biscayne Bay in 1945. He piloted a Ford Tri-Motor, the Goodyear Blimp, a Soviet MiG-15, a Czech L-39, a Chinese CJ-6 and a French Fouga Magister.

In November 1951, during the Korean War, Cristol joined the US Navy. After receiving his wings in 1953, he deployed to the western Pacific and flew both day and night missions in the Grumman AF Guardian from the USS Princeton (CVS-37). Upon returning to the US, Cristol left active duty and joined the Naval Reserve.

He graduated from Naval Justice School and served as a naval JAG lawyer for twenty years. In 1983, Cristol was appointed an honorary professor of the Naval Justice School. During the 1980s, he was sent to the International Institute of Humanitarian Law at Sanremo to lecture on the Law of Naval Warfare.

== Research into USS Liberty incident ==
After completing law school, Cristol became a civil lawyer, and served as special assistant attorney general of Florida.

He returned to school in pursuit of a doctoral degree. While working on his Ph.D. thesis (from the late 1980s into the 1990s), Cristol analyzed the official investigations of the USS Liberty incident of June 8, 1967, in which Israeli forces attacked an American ship, resulting in a significant loss of life. The Liberty incident had already been investigated by more than a dozen government agencies and government-commissioned groups; it had always been found to have been an accident. Cristol conducted over 450 interviews. Freedom of Information Act requests were used to obtain declassification of the Clark Clifford Report, 22 hot-line messages, 22 National Security Agency documents, and 31 National Security Council documents. Cristol also obtained classified Israeli documents. The conclusion of his dissertation was that the attack on the USS Liberty was a mistake.

Following completion of course work, Cristol continued to pursue information surrounding the event. He sued the National Security Agency under the Freedom of Information Act. In 2004 the agency released audio tapes which had been collected by an NSA unit aboard a Navy Lockheed EC-121 Warning Star aircraft flying near the scene of the USS Liberty attack. Subsequently, Cristol published his analysis in 2002 as a book about the attack, The Liberty Incident: The 1967 Attack on the U.S. Navy Spy Ship. Cristol concluded that the tapes show the attack was an accident, and that the Israelis mistook the ship for an Egyptian warship.

Cristol's second book, The Liberty Incident Revealed: The Definitive Account of the 1967 Israeli Attack on the U.S. Navy Spy Ship, was published by the Naval Institute Press in 2013. One of the Naval History and Heritage Command’s webpages pertaining to the USS Liberty incident cites this book as its primary source. Curiously, neither of Cristol’s books contains interviews from any Liberty survivors, despite many still being alive and willing to discuss their experiences at the time the books were being written. Furthermore, many Liberty survivors have claimed that The Liberty Incident (2002) and The Liberty Incident Revealed (2013) contain many errors and omissions.

He spoke in favor of Israel during a 2004 U.S. State Department symposium that was convened in about the Six-Day War in response to the findings of the 2003 Moorer Commission and the 2004 release of Captain Ward Boston’s affidavit pertaining to the USS Liberty incident. He spoke alongside Marc J. Susser (the State Department’s official historian), Michael B. Oren (a Middle Eastern historian and Israeli politician), and James Bamford (an author and Liberty advocate).

Cristol wrote several online articles challenging the assertions made by James Bamford and Liberty survivors.

== Civilian career ==
Cristol was an adjunct professor at the University of Miami School of Law where he taught a bankruptcy course.

=== O.J. Simpson and other notable rulings ===
Cristol presided over the Chapter 11 reorganization of General Development Corporation (one of the largest reorganizations in U.S. history), Prime Motor Inns, Flannigans, Banco Latino International, Arrow Air, and Pan American Airways.

In 2007, Cristol awarded the rights of O. J. Simpson's book If I Did It to the family of Ronald Goldman to satisfy a $38 million wrongful death judgment against Simpson.

=== Humorous opinions ===
Cristol was known for his often humorous judicial opinions. In 1986, he authored an opinion in the bankruptcy proceedings of Robin E. Love written almost entirely in verse as a parody of Edgar Allan Poe's famous poem, The Raven. The decision was also notable because Cristol uses it to deny his own sua sponte motion to dismiss.

In 1992, when a bank's computer repeatedly and erroneously sent letters to debtors John Coffey Vivian and Margaret Vivian regarding a debt Cristol had ordered discharged, the judge held the computer in civil contempt of court after writing that the issue "has truly established, beyond any reasonable doubt, that Mr. and Mrs. Vivian have no sense of humor and no gratitude whatsoever for the court's prior efforts on their behalf." Cristol continued:

The Vivians were so annoyed that they went on to threaten that perhaps they should write to their family friend, a very well known, renowned and respected federal judge, about this serious matter. They then went on to say "May I hear from you or your secretary by return mail?". It is apparent that the Vivians are mad as you know what and they are not going to take it anymore. Likewise, this court is mad as you know what and is not going to take it anymore. Accordingly, and pursuant to Federal Rule of Bankruptcy Procedure 9020, the court determines the NationsBank computer to be in civil contempt of this court. Upon consideration, it is

ORDERED that the NationsBank computer, having been determined in civil contempt, is fined 50 megabytes of hard drive memory and 10 megabytes random access memory. The computer may purge itself of this contempt by ceasing the production and mailing of documents to Mr. and Mrs. Vivian.

In a 17-year case between two sisters, Judith Herskowitz and Susan Charney, Cristol entered an "ORDER OF SHANDA" granting a motion for sanctions and ordering as penalty "that Ms. Herskowitz shall obtain and mail to Ms. Charney, at least five days before Susan's next birthday, a birthday card which contains the words 'Happy Birthday Sister' and the signature of Ms. Herskowitz." He further ordered, "The card shall not contain any negative, inflammatory or unkind remarks but may contain an overture to family reconciliation and settlement."

== Personal life and death ==
Cristol was an avid aviator. He was a founding member of the National Museum of Naval Aviation at the Naval Air Station in Pensacola, Florida and a founding member of the Wings Over Miami Military and Classic Aircraft Museum in Miami, Florida. Cristol was an Angel Flight volunteer pilot, flying people in need of transportation to and from regional medical centers for treatment. The 2007 May/June issue of Airliners magazine published a story about Judge Cristol; and Dow Jones featured Judge Cristol on January 2, 2008 in a three-page article.

Cristol died on October 21, 2024, at the age of 95.

== Awards and honors ==
A. Jay Cristol was an Eagle Scout of the Boy Scouts of America, earned on March 6, 1944. He was honored as a National Eagle Scout Association Outstanding Eagle Scout in South Florida Council in 2021.

During his navy service, Cristol received the Meritorious Service Medal, the Navy Commendation Medal, Navy Achievement Medal, China Service Medal, National Defense Medal, Navy and Marine Corps Overseas Service Medal, Naval Reserve Medal, and Vietnam Service Medal.

In 1998, Pan Am was sold to Guilford Transportation, in a transaction which removed Pan Am from bankruptcy. Consequently, the company honored Cristol, who presided over the speedy reorganization, by naming one of their 727-225 aircraft the Clipper A. Jay Cristol. After presiding over the reorganization of Arrow Air, he was honored by having an Arrow Air Douglas DC-8-62 named the "Judge A. Jay Cristol."

Cristol was a founding member of the National Museum of Naval Aviation at the Naval Air Station in Pensacola, Florida and a founding member and historian of the Wings Over Miami aircraft museum in Miami.

In 2003, the Greater Miami Aviation Association honored Cristol with their Glenn Curtiss Award which recognizes the contributions of an individual to improve the South Florida community.

== Judicial appointments ==
- 1957-1988 - United States Navy Lawyer
- 1959-1963 - Office of the Attorney General, State of Florida. Special assistant to the attorney general of the State of Florida, 1959, 1961, 1963 and 1965 Legislative Sessions
- 1959-1985 - Cristol, Mishan, Sloto. Senior partner in commercial law firm
- 1985–2023 - United States Bankruptcy Court
  - April 17, 1985 - Appointed Judge of the United States Bankruptcy Court for the Southern District of Florida
  - October 1, 1993 – September 25, 1999 - Appointed Chief Judge of the United States Bankruptcy Court
  - April 17, 1999 - Reappointed Judge for second 14-year term through 2013
  - April 17, 2013 - Reappointed Judge for third 14-year term through 2027. (Retired January 13, 2023)

== Academic assignments ==
- 1983 - Honorary Professor of Law, United States Naval Justice School. Lecturer of Law of Naval Warfare at the International Institute of Humanitarian Law, San Remo, Italy
- 1988 to Present - Adjunct Professor of Law at University of Miami Law School
- 1994 - Bankruptcy Law Instructor to Russian Judges for the National Conference of Bankruptcy Judges, Atlanta
- 1995 - Bankruptcy Law Instructor to Judges from Hong Kong, Malaysia, India, Thailand and South Africa for the National Conference of Bankruptcy Judges, New Orleans
- 1996 - Bankruptcy Law Instructor of Slovenian Judges for the Judicial Development Program sponsored by the u.S. Department of State, and American Bankruptcy Institute, Slovenia
- 1996 - Bankruptcy Law Instructor to Czech Republic Judges for the Judicial Development Program sponsored by the U.S. Department of state, and American Bankruptcy Institute, Czech Republic

== Publications ==
- "Theoretical Legal Problems in Converting the Central and Eastern European Military Industrial Complex to a Free Market Economy," 27 Foundation Notes, Naval War College (Spring 1996).
- The Liberty Incident (1997), Ph.D. dissertation, University of Miami.
- Bankruptcy Alchemy: Conversion of Nothing to Golden Opportunity. St. Thomas Law Review 9(1997):305. (with Ali Sarmiento Walden)
- The Liberty Incident: The 1967 Attack on the U.S. Navy Spy Ship. Washington (DC): Brassey's Military, 2002. ISBN 1-574-88536-7 OCLC 49249144
- "The USS Liberty and the Role of Intelligence". Foreign Relations of the United States, 1964-1968, Vol. XIX, Dept. Of State (Washington D.C. 2004). Cristol, Castle and Hadden.
- The Liberty Incident Revealed: the Definitive Account of the 1967 Israeli Attack on the U.S. Navy Spy Ship. Naval Institute Press, 2013. ISBN 978-1612513409
