= Ernest Carl Castle =

US Navy captain (1926–2020)

- Born: November 22, 1926; Sioux Falls, South Dakota, U.S.
- Died: September 26, 2020 (aged 93); Mechanicsville, Virginia, U.S.
- Military career
- Allegiance: United States of America
- Branch: United States Navy
- Service years: 1948–1984
- Rank: Captain
- Conflicts: Korean War; Vietnam

Ernest Carl Castle was a captain in the United States Navy.

== Biography ==
Ernest C. Castle was born in Sioux Falls, South Dakota in 1926. He graduated from the United States Naval Academy in 1948. Castle was awarded the Silver Star for conspicuous gallantry in clearing a fouled mine from the otter of the USS Chatterer (AMS-40) during operations off Korea in May 1952. He was the Naval Attaché to Israel during the Six-Day War. This included the USS Liberty incident. Additionally, he served as military briefer for Robert McNamara during the Cuban Missile Crisis. He received the Meritorious Civilian Service Award from US President John F. Kennedy for his work during the crisis.

Castle earned his Ph.D. from the University of South Carolina in 1984, and joined the faculty there following retirement from the Navy.

== See also ==
- The Liberty Incident: The 1967 Israeli Attack on the U.S. Navy Spy Ship, by A. Jay Cristo page xix
- MilitaryTimes http://valor.militarytimes.com/recipient.php?recipientid=55382
- Obituary https://www.dignitymemorial.com/obituaries/mechanicsville-va/ernest-castle-9379632
