= The Reporters =

The Reporters may refer to:

- Law reporters, for which see Law report
- News journalists, for which see Reporter
- The Reporters (book), a book by John William Wallace
- The Reporters (1988 TV program), a 1980s television program

== See also ==
- The Reporter (disambiguation)
