= Yeshayahu Yerushalmi =

Israeli judge

Yeshayahu Yerushalmi (Hebrew: ישעיהו ירושלמי), also Isaiah Yerushalmi (1920 in Poland – June 1, 1999), was an Israeli judge. Yerushalmi was the presiding judge of the preliminary Israeli inquiry into the USS Liberty incident (called the Yerushalmi Report).

== Biography ==
Yeshayahu Yerushalmi was born in Poland. As a teenager, he immigrated to Mandatory Palestine in 1935. A graduate of Tel Aviv's Balfour College, he studied law at the Hebrew University of Jerusalem and joined the Haganah.

== Legal career ==
He served as a law clerk and lawyer from March 1942 to 1947 and then joined the military where he transferred to the Military Advocate General and became JAG to the Israeli Air Force, later to the Israeli Navy. In 1957 he was appointed as a judge on the Military Court of Appeals, a position in which he held until launching an enquiry in the USS Liberty incident in 1967.

In his investigation into the assault, Yerushalmi conceded that the pilots responsible for the attack had spotted the markings on the ship but were generally uncertain of the identity of the ship. His report diminished many of the criticisms against Israeli forces in the attack despite the fact that two Israeli Navy officers had appeared to be aware of who was running the Liberty. Yerushalmi conceded that the United States ship had entered waters which "were dangerous for shipping" and concluded that the Israel perpetrators responsible for the deaths of 34 Americans had acted within reason during wartime.

Although Yerushalmi's report was criticized as "poorly written", all US enquiries into the event concluded that it was a genuine case of mistaken identity. While the attack was initially seen as a deliberate attack against the US, NSA has provided evidence from radio intercepts that the target was erroneously identified as having hostile intent and was not identified as American until 44 minutes after the attack. Also complicating the situation was that just two days prior to the incident on June 8, 1967, the United States and the United Nations Security Council had declared that they had no warships within hundreds of miles of the fighting zone.

== See also ==
- Israeli law
