= El Reportero =

El Reportero (The Reporter) may refer to:

- El Reportero (North Alabama newspaper)
- El Reportero ( Puerto Rican newspaper)
- El Reportero (San Francisco newspaper), bilingual newspaper
- El Reportero (1968 film), with actor Amador Bendayán
- El Reportero (1974 film), directed by Michelangelo Antonioni

== See also ==
- The Reporter (disambiguation)
