= USS Amberjack (SS-522) =

Submarine of the United States

Coordinates: 3.713058°S 38.473484°W

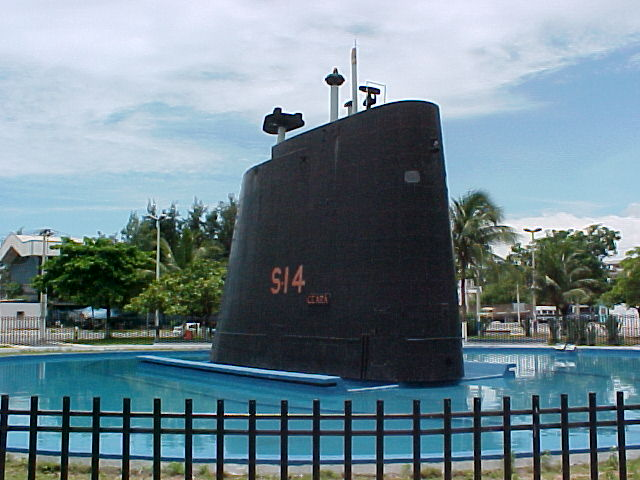
- Ceará's sail preserved in Fortaleza.

History

United States
- Builder: Boston Navy Yard
- Laid down: 8 February 1944
- Launched: 15 December 1944
- Commissioned: 4 March 1946
- Decommissioned: 17 October 1973
- Stricken: 17 October 1973
- Fate: Transferred to Brazil, 17 October 1973

History

Brazil
- Name: Ceará (S-14)
- Acquired: 17 October 1973
- Decommissioned: 21 September 1987
- Fate: Scrapped; sail preserved in Fortaleza, Ceará.

General characteristics (As completed)
- Class & type: Tench-class diesel-electric submarine
- Displacement: 1,570 tons (1,595 t) surfaced; 2,428 tons (2,467 t) submerged
- Length: 311 ft 8 in (95.00 m)
- Beam: 27 ft 3 in (8.31 m)
- Draft: 17 ft 0 in (5.18 m) maximum
- Propulsion: 4 × Fairbanks-Morse Model 38D8-⅛ 10-cylinder opposed piston diesel engines driving electrical generators; 2 × 126-cell Sargo batteries; 2 × low-speed direct-drive Westinghouse electric motors; two propellers; 5,400 shp (4.0 MW) surfaced; 2,740 shp (2.0 MW) submerged
- Speed: 20.25 knots (38 km/h) surfaced; 8.75 knots (16 km/h) submerged
- Range: 11,000 nautical miles (20,000 km) surfaced at 10 knots (19 km/h)
- Endurance: 48 hours at 2 knots (3.7 km/h) submerged; 75 days on patrol
- Test depth: 400 ft (120 m)
- Complement: 10 officers, 71 enlisted
- Armament: 10 × 21 inch (533 mm) torpedo tubes; (six forward, four aft); 28 torpedoes; 2 × 5 in (130 mm) caliber deck guns; Bofors 40 mm and Oerlikon 20 mm cannon

General characteristics (Guppy II)
- Displacement: 1,870 tons (1,900 t) surfaced; 2,440 tons (2,480 t) submerged
- Length: 307 ft (93.6 m)
- Beam: 27 ft 4 in (7.4 m)
- Draft: 17 ft (5.2 m)
- Propulsion: Snorkel added; Batteries upgraded to GUPPY type, capacity expanded to 504 cells (1 × 184 cell, 1 × 68 cell, and 2 × 126 cell batteries)
- Speed: Surfaced: 18.0 knots (33.3 km/h) maximum; 13.5 knots (25.0 km/h) cruising; Submerged: 16.0 knots (29.6 km/h) for ½ hour; 9.0 knots (16.7 km/h) snorkeling; 3.5 knots (6.5 km/h) cruising
- Range: 15,000 nm (28,000 km) surfaced at 11 knots (20 km/h)
- Endurance: 48 hours at 4 knots (7 km/h) submerged
- Complement: 9–10 officers; 5 senior petty officers; 70 enlisted men
- Sensors & processing systems: WFA active sonar; JT passive sonar; Mk 106 torpedo fire control system
- Armament: 10 × 21 in (533 mm) torpedo tubes; (six forward, four aft); all guns removed

USS Amberjack (SS-522), a WWII-era Tench-class submarine, was the second submarine of the United States Navy named for the amberjack, a vigorous sport fish found in the western Atlantic from New England to Brazil.

== Commissioning ==
Her keel was laid down by the Boston Naval Shipyard of Boston, Massachusetts, on 8 February 1944. She was launched on 15 December 1944 sponsored by Mrs. Walter E. Lang Jr., and commissioned on 4 March 1946.

== Shakedown and first conversion ==
Following shakedown training in the West Indies and in the Gulf of Mexico, Amberjack reported on 17 June for duty with SubRon8. Operating out of the Submarine Base, New London, Connecticut, she conducted training missions in the North Atlantic, and, in November 1946, made a cruise above the Arctic Circle. In January 1947, the submarine entered the Portsmouth Naval Shipyard for extensive modifications and thereafter spent about a year undergoing a Greater Underwater Propulsion Power Program (GUPPY) conversion during which her hull and sail were streamlined and additional batteries and a snorkel were installed to increase her submerged speed endurance, and maneuverability. In January 1948, she reported for duty with SubRon4 based at Key West, Florida. She operated along the east coast and in the West Indies for a little more than 11 years. Her schedule included the development of tactics and independent ship exercises, type training, periodic overhauls, and fleet exercises. During this period, she also visited numerous Caribbean Sea ports. In July 1952, Amberjack was transferred to the newly established SubRon12, though she remained based at Key West and her employment continued as before.

== European and NATO exercises ==
Early in August 1959, after more than 11 years of operations out of Key West, the submarine's home port was changed to Charleston, South Carolina. She arrived there on 8 August and reported for duty with her former squadron, SubRon4. While working out of her new home port, Amberjack's operations remained much as they had been before with one significant difference: she began making deployments to European waters. In August, September and October 1960, the submarine participated in a NATO exercise before making a week-long port visit to Portsmouth, England. She returned to Charleston late in October and resumed her normal duties. Between May and September 1961, the warship deployed to the Mediterranean Sea for duty in the Sixth Fleet. After a three-year interlude operating along the east coast and in the West Indies, Amberjack made another Mediterranean cruise between 7 July and 1 November 1964. She spent the ensuing 29 months working out of Charleston. In 1967, the submarine made a three-month deployment to the Mediterranean between 23 April and 24 July. On 2 September 1969, following another 25 months of operations along the US east coast and in the West Indies, she embarked upon her last deployment from Charleston in European waters during which she participated in another NATO exercise with units of the British, Canadian, and Dutch navies. At the conclusion of the exercise, Amberjack visited a number of ports in northern Europe before returning to Charleston on 12 December 1969.

=== USS Liberty incident ===
There is speculation amongst survivors of the 1967 Israeli attack on the USS Liberty and their supporters that a U.S. Navy submarine observed and filmed the attack through their periscope. The working theory is that the submarine was either the Amberjack or the USS Andrew Jackson. Seeing how the Amberjack was on a 3-month deployment to the eastern Mediterranean Sea to reconnoiter Egypt, this would mean she could, in theory, have been in the vicinity of the attack when it occurred. There is no confirmation of this theory and it remains speculative.

In 1988, the LBJ Presidential Library declassified and released a document from the Liberty archive with the “Top Secret—Eyes Only” security caveat (Document #12C sanitized and released 21DEC88 under review case 86–199). This “Memorandum for the Record” dated April 10, 1967 reported a briefing of the “303 Committee” by General Ralph D. Steakley. According to the memo, General Steakley “briefed the committee on a sensitive DOD project known as FRONTLET 615,” which is identified in a handwritten note on the original memorandum as “submarine within U.A.R. waters.” Further Freedom of Information Act requests returned no information on any project called “FRONTLET 615.” This has lent credence to the theory that a U.S. Navy submarine was present during the attack.

In February 1997, a senior member of the crew of the Amberjack told Liberty survivor James Ennes that he had watched the attack through the periscope and took pictures. When contacted, 4 crewmen stated that they were so close to the Liberty when it came under attack that some of the crew believed that the Amberjack herself was under attack by depth charges. Captain August Hubal, the commanding officer of the Amberjack at the time of the attack, insisted that the vessel was 100 miles (160 kilometers) from the Liberty. When told the crew believed they were closer, he replied “They must be mistaken.” On July 2, 2003, the National Security Agency stated that there had been “no radio intercepts made by the U.S. submarine Amberjack.” James Ennes believes that if the submarine photography does exist, it should show that the Liberty's flag was clearly visible to the attacking aircraft and torpedo boats, which would directly contradict the Israeli narrative of the attack.

== End of Service ==
On 9 July 1970, Amberjack arrived in her new home port, Key West, Florida, her base for the remainder of her service in the United States Navy. She made her last deployment to the Mediterranean between 27 November 1972, and 30 March 1973. On 17 October 1973, Amberjack was decommissioned at Key West, her name was struck from the Naval Vessel Register, was transferred to the Brazilian Navy, and was commissioned as Ceará (S-14).
