= Reporter (Scotland) =

In Scotland, reporter is the title given to various officials of the Scottish Government.

In the context of spatial planning, reporters perform the equivalent function of planning inspectors in England and Wales. The chief reporter is Lindsey Nicoll.

The children's reporter is responsible for child protection within Scotland.
