= The Reporter (magazine) =

Defunct American periodical (1949-68)

- Former editors: Max Ascoli
- Categories: News magazine
- Frequency: Biweekly
- First issue: 1949
- Final issue: 1968
- Country: United States
- Based in: New York City
- Language: English
- ISSN: 1049-1600

The Reporter was an American biweekly news magazine published in New York City from 1949 through 1968.

== History and profile ==
The magazine was founded by Max Ascoli, who was born in 1898 in Ferrara, Italy to a Jewish family. Ascoli grew up to become a professor in political philosophy and law, and began to draw the attention of authorities for his outspoken anti-fascist views. He was arrested in 1928, and emigrated to the United States three years later.

Throughout the 1930s and 1940s, Ascoli became a prominent American anti-fascist, cultivating relationships with influential intellectuals and government officials. With the beginning of the Cold War, Ascoli became convinced of the need to counter Soviet propaganda and convince Americans of the importance of their assuming a leadership role in the world. To accomplish those ends, he joined with journalist James Reston to found The Reporter in 1949. Ascoli described the liberalism of The Reporter as one that favored liberty not in the purely negative sense, but as "always identified with and related to specific and present situations." Writing in 1955, he described the two main tasks of American liberalism as seeking to move the country beyond demagoguery and making the case for American democracy and capitalism to the rest of the world. According to one scholar, "The Reporter was explicitly created to serve as a platform for those anticommunists who were neither former communists nor former fellow travelers."

From the beginning, The Reporter acknowledged its activist agenda, taking a hawkish position on the Cold War. Denouncing historical isolationism, one unsigned 1949 article argued that the US was faced with "compulsion to play a leading role in the world—not to play it intermittently, by casual interventions and the enunciation of moral principles, but to play it consistently and for the greatest stakes…" Always stressing the interconnection between domestic and international issues, the magazine denounced McCarthyism and racial segregation not only on the grounds that such illiberal policies were contrary to American ideals, but by arguing that they hurt the United States in the global war of ideas.

The Reporter had a huge influence in its day, both among policy makers and the educated public. One author, writing in Commentary in 1960, praised The Reporter as "represent[ing] the concerns of intelligent American liberalism." In a 1962 survey of reporters asking what magazines they cited in their work, The Reporter came in fourth place after Time, U.S. News & World Report, and Newsweek, with no other publication coming close. It would eventually achieve a circulation of 215,000 readers. Despite its internationalist orientation and the promotion of the magazine by U.S. government agencies working abroad, however, The Reporter had relatively few European readers. Contributors included some of the most prominent statesmen, journalists, and intellectuals of the day. The Reporter ceased publication in 1968 due to the widening gap between Ascoli’s hawkish stance on the Vietnam War on the one hand, and the opinions of readers and advertisers on the other. Ascoli pointed to an "increasingly heavy editorial and financial burden" behind his decision to merge his publication with Harper’s Magazine.

== Notable positions and controversies ==
=== The China Lobby ===
After the victory of the forces of Mao Tse-tung in the Chinese Civil War, Senator Joseph McCarthy and other conservatives accused the Truman Administration of previously not having done enough to make sure that China did not fall to Communism, and failing to sufficiently support the efforts to overturn the results of the war. In 1952, The Reporter devoted the bulk of two full issues to the influence of what it called the China Lobby on the American government. According to the exposé, a select group of Chinese elites centered around defeated Chinese Nationalist leader Chiang Kai-shek had since 1940 been working on convincing the American government to support its corrupt leadership, to the detriment of U.S. interests. The lobby was now allegedly preventing the United States from acknowledging that the Nationalist cause was lost and dealing with the situation in China in a realistic manner.

In order to promote its exposé, The Reporter purchased full-page ads in The New York Times. According to one author, the size of the report on the China Lobby and the investigative resources that it required indicate that some parts of the American government provided The Reporter with substantial financial assistance. In fact, staff received information from, among other government agencies, the IRS, the Treasury Department, the CIA, and the FBI. As the controversy over who lost China involved a rivalry between the pro-McCarthy FBI and the CIA, Elke van Cassel argues that "The Reporter got caught in the middle of this power struggle," siding with the latter. Two years before the publication of the China Lobby exposé, Senator William Knowland had accused the magazine of being supportive of the Chinese Communists, a charge that Ascoli vigorously denied.

=== McCarthyism ===
The Reporter consistently used extremely harsh terms to denounce McCarthyism. History professor Peter Viereck called the phenomenon a form of "mob rule" and compared it to the excesses of the French Revolution. In the words of Ascoli,

[t]he facts against McCarthyism were not difficult to dig out, the ideas against which they stood were the very ones on which America was founded. The protagonist himself was like an overdrawn caricature of the villain—a villain who doubly wounded the nation with his reckless, haphazard persecution of harmless human beings and with the immunity he granted to Communist agents by not catching a single one of them.

=== Transatlantic and European Unity ===
Reflecting its liberal internationalist orientation, The Reporter supported the pacts, treaties, and agreements that would become the cornerstones of transatlantic cooperation and European unity. It warned against a weakening of the Atlantic alliance, which it saw as being important not only as a security organization, but as a force for the triumph of democratic ideals and political and economic cooperation. In other articles it applauded the economic ideas underlying the Schuman Plan and praised the expansion of the European Common Market. A 1949 article criticized what the author perceived as isolationist tendencies in the British government of the time.

Throughout the Cold War era, prominent foreign policy intellectuals would use the pages of The Reporter to attempt to shape public opinion. For example, in the decade before his joining the Nixon Administration, Henry Kissinger wrote several articles for the publication, among them one arguing for a more integrated Atlantic Alliance, and another putting forth practical steps that could be taken towards German unification.

=== Civil rights ===
The Reporter took a consistent position in favor of civil rights for African Americans. A 1954 article, for example, argued that desegregation had been a success in the armed forces. Therefore, fears over the negative consequences of racially integrating the public schools were overblown. The magazine did not simply focus on race relations in the American context; English writer Russel Warren Howe took to the magazine’s pages to denounce racism towards nonwhite immigrants in Great Britain.

=== The Counter-Culture and the New Left ===
Despite its support for civil rights and other liberal causes, The Reporter also levied harsh criticisms at many aspects of the counter-culture and the New Left. In his farewell to the readers of the magazine, Ascoli took liberals to task for being hesitant in denouncing the lack of ethics among some younger activists and called participatory democracy "one of the best recipes of establishing tyranny that has ever been concocted…" In the same issue, Edmond Taylor referred to the May 1968 protests in France as "the nihilist revolution." Similarly, Professor William P. Gerberding wrote that in his opinion it was "wrong and destructive to embrace or even to adopt a tolerant attitude toward the radical politics of, for example, the New Left or the black racists."

=== Vietnam War ===
During the time that the United States began to become involved in Vietnam, The Reporter applauded and encouraged American efforts to help South Vietnam develop. As American involvement deepened and the conflict developed, The Reporter sent journalists to Southeast Asia to cover the war. Articles denounced the pessimism of some members of the American establishment and stressed what the magazine saw as the strategic importance of winning the war. In 1966, journalist Richard C. Hottlett mocked the idea that there was no military solution to the conflict and argued that American political goals could be achieved only after security had been established.

According to Douglass Carter, who served on the staff of The Reporter for 15 years, Ascoli over time "became more hard-line than many hard-liners in government toward the American commitment in Viet Nam." He claimed that it was because of this unwavering support for continuing the war effort that many former readers turned away from the magazine in the 1960s.

== As a cultural journal ==
Although Ascoli was primarily interested in spreading his political ideals, The Reporter also prided itself on being a literary journal. In addition to its regular book reviews, it was the first English language publication to present excerpts from Doctor Zhivago to its audience. Ascoli had a great deal of appreciation for the work, which he saw as proof that creativity could flourish even under the most oppressive conditions.

== Connections to the CIA and American government ==
Elke van Cassel documents many connections that The Reporter had to the American intelligence establishment and believes that there is circumstantial evidence that the magazine was funded by the CIA. She notes that The Reporter was created at around the same time that the CIA began funding pro-American artists and journalists, including such similar magazines as Partisan Review and New Leader, and folded around the time that these kinds of clandestine activities were beginning to draw public scrutiny. The magazine stressed the importance of ideas in the Cold War, and believed that the United States government needed to defend its political and economic system to the world. This indicates that its editors would not have been opposed to cooperating with and possibly even accepting funding from the American government. Ascoli and other members of his staff were personally and professionally acquainted with some of the major figures of the mid-century American intelligence establishment and worked for a handful of organizations that were connected to or funded by the CIA. Cassel finds it notable that in the archives of the magazine its financial records, along with other important pieces of information, are missing. In the end, she concludes that while there is no direct evidence of CIA funding, the circumstantial case is substantial. At the very least, it can be established that The Reporter and its staff had close working relationships with several influential government officials and agencies, including the CIA and other services engaged in promoting American ideals and interests through the media.

== Notable contributors ==
- Dean Acheson
- Max Ascoli
- James Baldwin
- McGeorge Bundy
- Douglass Cater
- Isaac Deutscher
- Theodore Draper
- Harris Ellsworth
- John Kenneth Galbraith
- William Gerberding
- Gertrude Himmelfarb
- Irving Howe
- Russel Warren Howe
- Henry Kissinger
- Irving Kristol
- Walter Laqueur
- William Lee Miller
- Boris Pasternak
- James Reston
- Eugene V. Rostow
- Arthur Schlesinger, Jr.
- Claire Sterling
- Edmond Taylor
- Peter Viereck
- Edmund Wilson
- Frederic V. Grunfeld
