= Shapoor Reporter =

British spy (1921–2013)

Sir Shapoor Ardeshirji Reporter KBE
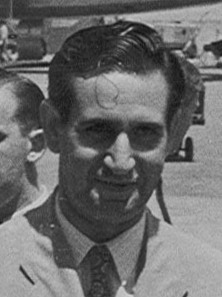
- Reporter in 1954
- Born: February 26, 1921; Tehran, Sublime State of Persia (present-day Iran)
- Died: December 23, 2013 (aged 92); London, United Kingdom
- Espionage activity
- Allegiance: United Kingdom
- Service branch: Secret Intelligence Service
- Operations: Operation Boot

Sir Shapoor Reporter KBE (1921–2013) was an Iranian-born British diplomat, journalist, businessman in Pahlavi-era Iran. He was a confidant to Mohammad Reza Pahlavi, the last Shah of Iran. Throughout his career, he worked in a variety of capacities, including as an English teacher, a foreign journalist, and primarily as a political and financial broker. He was well recognised for having strong ties to the Pahlavi establishment due to his friendship with the reigning Shah since their days in school. He is alleged to have also worked as a British intelligence agent in Iran and to have had an important role in the 1953 coup d'état against the prime minister of the time, Mohammad Mosaddegh in support of Mohammad Reza Pahlavi. This narrative that he was a crucial British intelligence asset has been disputed. According to Fakhreddin Azimi at the University of Connecticut his importance and role "seem[s] exaggerated and have not been corroborated by the available documentary sources". His loyalty to the Shah was remarked upon by Denis Wright, the British ambassador when he worked as journalist for The Times. Wright described Reporter, as "the shah's man", and noted that "I have yet to read a message from him containing a word which might induce His Majesty’s displeasure".

== Biography ==
Shapoor Reporter was born in Tehran in 1921, some sources including Ervand Abrahamian report he was born in Delhi. His father, Ardeshir Reporter, was an Indian Parsi and a British intelligence officer who came from Mumbai to Tehran in 1893 as the agent of Parsis. Ardeshir Reporter was one of the pivotal people in the foundation of the Pahlavi dynasty, and he was personally able to secure British support for the budding officer Reza Khan against the Qajar dynasty.

Educated in Westminster and Kings College, Shapoor Reporter graduated in Political Science and Literature. In 1943, Shapoor Reporter was sent to India to set up the Radio Delhi programs being broadcast in Persian. In 1945, he was assigned to serve in Bahrain, and after one year was sent to China.

In 1947, Shapoor Reporter was sent to Tehran to serve as secretary to the first Indian ambassador in Tehran. During the oil nationalization in Iran, he was accorded as assistant to the U.S. ambassador Loy W. Henderson for three years, during which he had a role in the 1953 military coup. As a reward, he was offered a position in the State Department and U.S. citizenship by the U.S. secretary of state for "his brilliant services to the common cause". Then he was appointed as liaison officer for Mohammad Reza Pahlavi, the Shah of Iran.

Shapoor Reporter became a Knight Commander of the Order of the British Empire in 1973, shortly after acting as an intermediary in a £100 million arms sale from the United Kingdom to Iran, for which he also received £1 million from the UK Ministry of Defence. In a 1976 bribes trial in London, he was described as "Mr. Fixit" and he was said to have received £1 million commission on one arms deal. Shapoor Reporter died in London in 2013.
