= Ardeshir Reporter =

British spy (1865–1932)

Ardeshir Ji Reporter
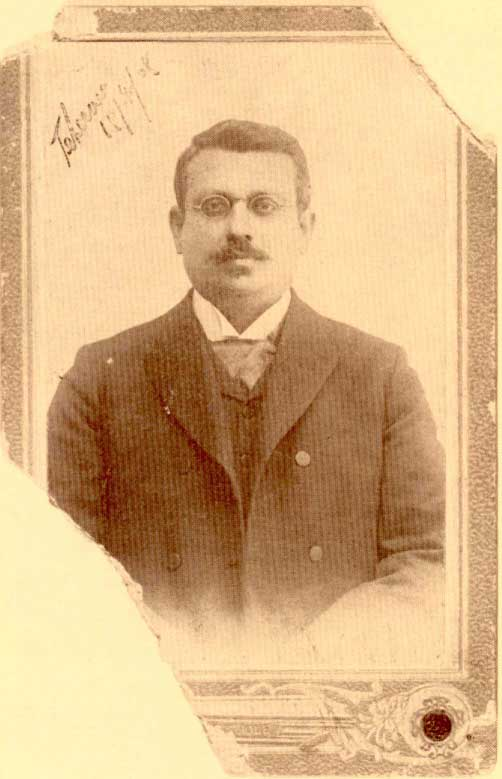
- Born: 22 August 1865; Mumbai, India
- Died: 1932 (aged 66–67); Pahlavi Iran
- Education: Science, Political Studies and History
- Occupations: Journalist, Intelligence agent
- Era: Qajar dynasty, Pahlavi dynasty
- Spouse: Shireen Banoo
- Children: 4, including Shapoor Reporter

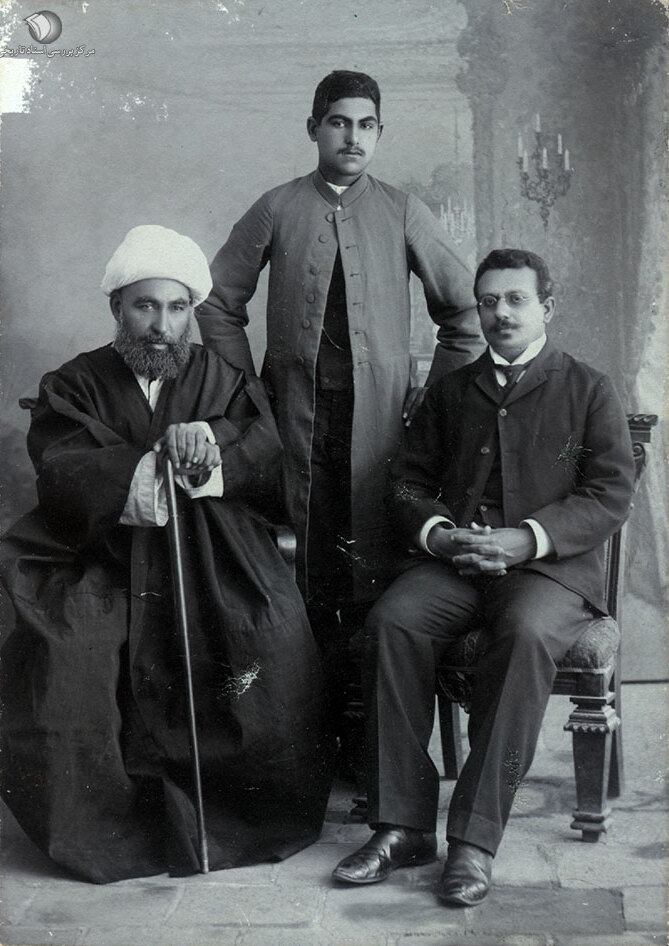
Ardeshir Reporter (right), Mehdi Malekzadeh and Malik al-Motakallemin

Ardeshir Reporter or Sir Ardeshir Ji Reporter (1865–1932) was born into a Zoroastrian Parsi family in Bombay on 22 August 1865. While working in Iran for many years, he secretly worked as an intelligence agent for the British, spying on the Qajar dynasty. He was originally sent to Iran under the cover of being a reporter for The Times. It was he who introduced General Ironside to Reza Khan, and it was Ironside who encouraged Reza Khan to seize power. According to his own will, he was the one who discovered Reza Khan and guided him in the coup on 22 February 1921. Therefore, he was instrumental in Reza Khan's 1921 military coup and the consequent establishment of Pahlavi Iran with the enthronement of Reza Khan as the new shah in 1925. Reporter died in Tehran in 1933. His son, Shapoor Reporter, was also a clandestine intelligence agent of the British Intelligence Service in Iran who served the Pahlavi dynasty after Reza Shah's death.

== Life as an active secret agent ==
Ardeshir Reporter was born in Bombay, son of Edulji Reporter, and was sent to Britain to study once he became a young man. After graduating in science, political studies and history in Britain, he returned to India at the age of 27. At the time, the chair of Iran's Parsi Panchayet, Kay Khosrow Jee Khan Saheb, died, and Reporter was sent to take over the position.

During his mission in Iran, he was appointed to four different key positions: Political Consultant to Britain Embassy in Iran, chair to Iran's Parsi Panchayet, Representative to Tata Company and a reporter for Britain's The Times. In his handwritten biography, of which some parts have survived, he emphasized that above all his roles, he was committed to oversee Iran's highlighted political trends and report them back to India. The forty years he spent in Iran was characterized by the major political transformations of the country, commencing before Naser al-Din Shah Qajar assassination and covering Reza Shah taking over the power through the Coup. Reporter has highlighted his role across this critical period not as a sheer observer but as an active player. His name has been reported amongst the main teachers at Tehran School of Law and Political Science next to other prominent figures like Mohammad Ali Foroughi.

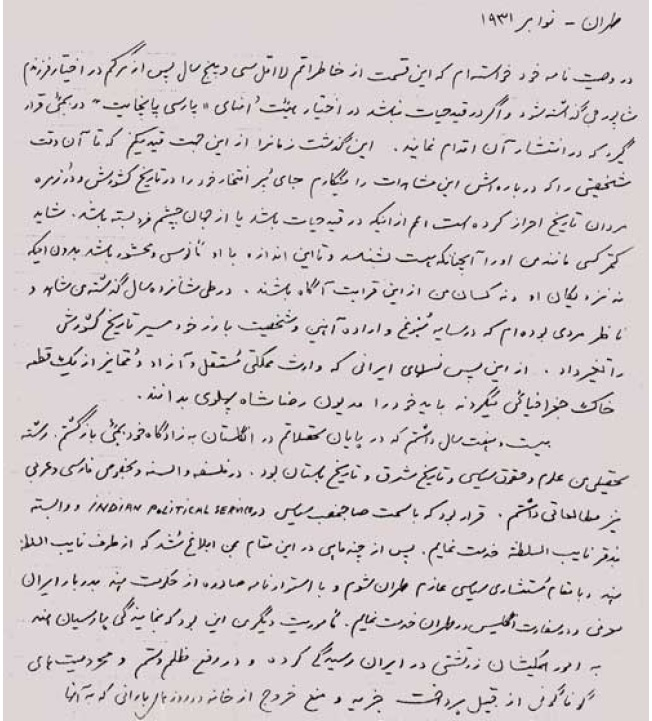
Reporter's handwritten biography

Some loose pieces of evidence support that in 1906 he became an influential player at Reveil de l'Iran, the first formal known masonic French lodge in the country. His relations and bonds with high-profile Iranians and British politicians and influencers allowed him to play a role during Iranian Constitutional Revolution. His name has been recorded among the forty founders of Freedom Seekers of Iran Secret Association being established before the revolution in Tehran. The secret association was aimed at facilitating the network of constitutionalists through collective responses, introducing political and religious icons to the network and publishing anonymous papers promoting anti-monarchy ideas. Some historians argued that he was the one who sought the approval from British embassy for the mass sanctuary of constitutionalists at Britain's embassy compound in 1906 which followed by granting the constitution by Mozaffar ad-Din Shah Qajar.

In his biography, Reporter clarifies his mission for the nomination of a suitable replacement from the Persian Cossack Brigade to overthrow the Qajar dynasty and topple Ahmad Shah Qajar. He openly details his responsibility in coaching Reza Khan before and after he became the King of Iran. Under the commandment of Britain's Minister of Defence, Winston Churchill, he assisted Britain in targeting, educating and directing Reza Khan toward his journey in taking over power. He, as he stated himself, introduced Reza to William Edmund Ironside, who later promoted and supported Reza Shah in seizing the capital, Tehran.

In his biography, Reporter openly elaborates his viewpoints on the key directions of ruling Iran and the role he played in pushing Reza Shah toward his suggested pathways. Some of these key directions include:

- Nomadic groups: He strongly recommends Reza Shah to weaken and if needed diminish the diverse ethnic and nomadic groups for the favour of a powerful independent centralized government. Reporter, as he claimed, had been living with Iran's different nomadic groups for over fifteen years and in his words, he tries to paint them as unfaithful and opportunist.
- Islamic Clerics: He endeavoured to persuade Reza Shah on the uselessness and deceitfulness of clerics and how they should be dismissed from the source of power.
- Foreign allies preferences: Although Reza Shah himself was serving Persian Cossack Brigade which was inclined to Russia's interests, Reporter, as an Agent to Britain, tries to highlight the downsides and risks of building a long-term alliance with Russia and convinces Reza Shah on the preference of Britain, as a reliable and beneficial ally, over the northern neighbour of the country, Russia.

Later on, Reporter's son, Shapoor, continued his father legacy by becoming an MI-6 agent in Iran all over Mohammad Reza Shah era.

== Iran's Parsi Panchayet ==
The remaining correspondence between Iran's Parsi Panchayet members and the Iranian government at the time, explicitly indicates the growing dissatisfaction under Reporter's management. Zoroastrians of Kerman in a telegraph dated 1915 addressed Iran's Ministry of Internal Affairs to announce their disapproval of Mr. Reporter as their appointed chair. They stated that Reporter's mismanagement had led the community toward disparity and contention rather than unity and integrity. The telegraph ended reiterating that many reasons of the disapproval preferred to be kept unexpressed and Iranian Zoroastrians strongly called for an Iranian Chair rather than a representative from overseas. In this document the political deeds of Reporter have been highlighted as controversial and misaligned with the true objectives of Iran's Zoroastrian community. In a parallel correspondence, Kerman's Zoroastrians requested Indian Panchayat authorities like Dinshaw Maneckji Petit to replace Reporter with a proper representative who truly respect the religion's principles. The frustration evidently was associated with the Reporter's candid approaches for promoting Zoroastrians to convert to the Baháʼí Faith.

== Promotion of Baháʼísm ==
Existing pieces of evidence support that Mr. Reporter in an unprecedented effort, promoted and supported Zoroastrians conversion to the Baháʼí Faith at the time he was a chair to Iran Parsi Panchayet. Objections to this improper action have been reflected in reports and media outlets at the time. In one case the author of an article in The Times of India has defended Reporter's conversion attempts. The author tries to convince the reader that Baháʼísm is a key solution to all the country diverse challenges. He put forward few quotes on his conclusion:

Shma-ul-Ulema Dr Sir Jivanii Modi used to declare that by adopting Baháʼísm a Zoroastrian became a true Zoroastrian and a Musalman a true Musalman. Will Mr Madan tell us that if there are no attempts, even remote or indirect, at converting the Parsians of Persia, how does his friend and colleague, Mr Ardeshir Edalji Reporter hope to bring about the immense increase in the number of Zoroastrians in the near future in Persia? Baháʼísm which diffused itself in less than five years from one end of Persia to another and which was bathed in the blood of its martyrs has been silently progressing and propagating itself. If Persia is to be at all re-generate it will be through this new faith.
