= Russell Warren Howe =

British author and journalist (1925–2008)

Russell Warren Howe (1 August 1925 – 17 December 2008) was a British author and journalist.

== Biography ==
Howe was a well known international journalist who wrote more than 20 books ranging from biographies, fiction, to seductive novels. After serving as a pilot in the Royal Air Force during World War II, he began his journalism career at the Reuters wire service in Paris. With Reuters, he wrote a variety of publications as chief correspondent in Africa and Europe. In the early 1970s, he settled in Washington, D.C. and began a prolific career writing interviews for the Washington Times, Christian Science Monitor, Baltimore Sun and Penthouse. He also contributed a column to the Indian newspaper, The Statesman. As an author, his books include Theirs the Darkness (1955), The Power Peddlers (1977), Weapons (1981), Mata Hari (1986), Sleeping With the FBI (1993), False Flags (1996) and Don't Laugh, You're Next: The Irrepressible Wit & Humor of Russell Warren Howe (2002). He is the recipient of five print media and TV awards, Writers Citizenship Award and Southern Prize for Fiction Award.
