= William C. Rogers III =

United States Navy Captain (1938–2025)

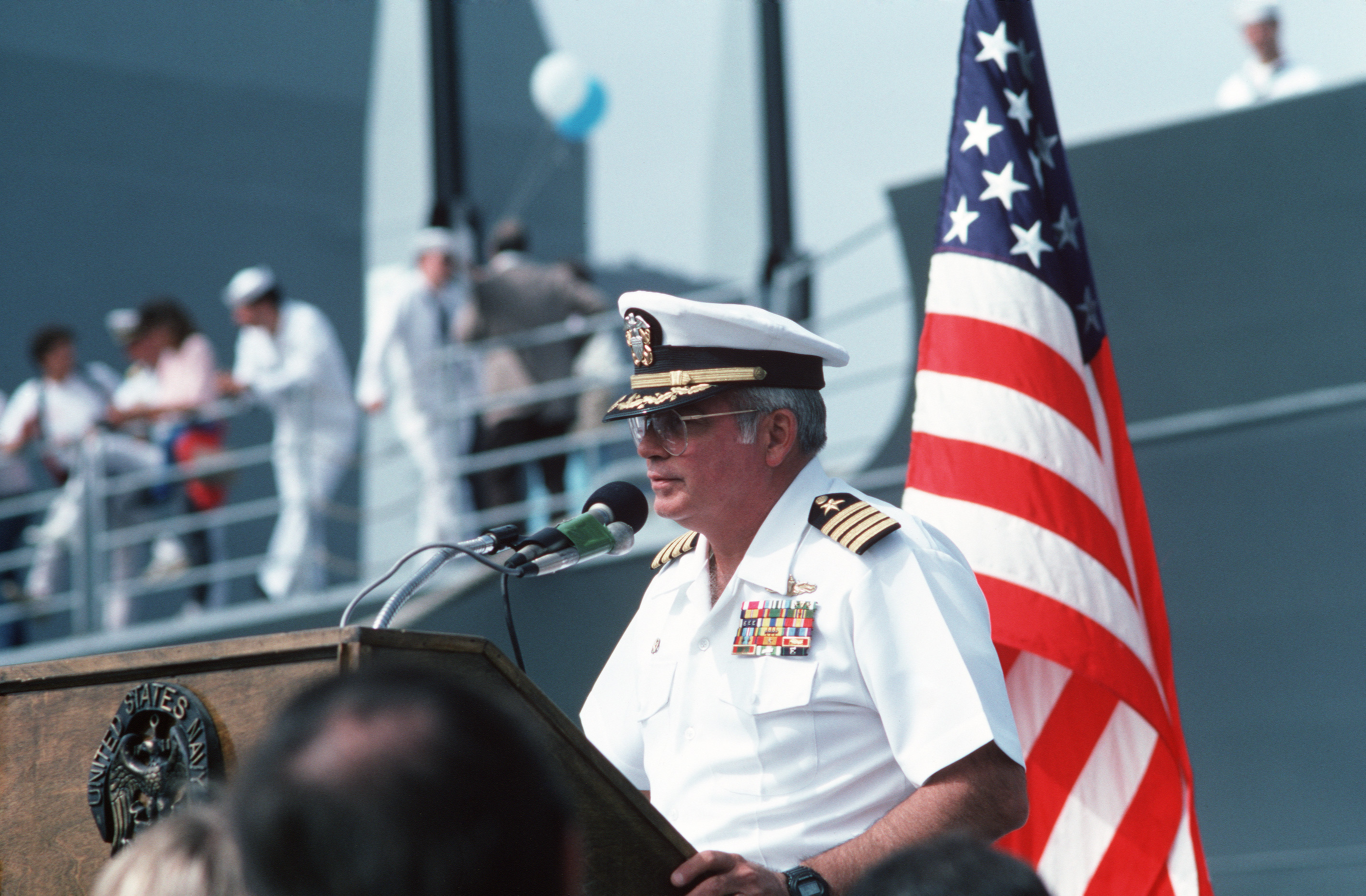
- Rogers speaking at the end of Vincennes 1988 deployment, after his ship shot down Iran Air Flight 655
- Born: December 13, 1938; Fort Worth, Texas, U.S.
- Died: June 30, 2025 (aged 86)
- Military career
- Allegiance: United States
- Branch: United States Navy
- Service years: 1965–1991
- Rank: Captain
- Commands: USS Cushing (DD-985); USS Vincennes (CG-49); Navy Tactical Training Group Point Loma
- Conflicts: Vietnam War; Operation Earnest Will
- Awards: Legion of Merit; Meritorious Service Medal; Joint Service Commendation Medal; Navy Commendation Medal; Combat Action Ribbon; Navy Expeditionary Medal; Armed Forces Expeditionary Medal

William Chapel Rogers III (December 13, 1938 – June 30, 2025) was an American naval officer and the captain of USS Vincennes, a Ticonderoga-class Aegis cruiser. During his command, the ship shot down Iran Air Flight 655 in the Persian Gulf in 1988, killing 290 civilians in a major international incident, forcing President Ronald Reagan to express deep regret and leading to a settlement in front of the International Court of Justice.

== Early life and career before 1988 ==
Rogers was born on December 13, 1938 in Fort Worth, Texas, and was raised in San Antonio, Texas. His father, William C. Rogers II, served as a psychologist in the United States Navy during World War II. Rogers had a younger brother who was paralyzed in an automobile accident and used a wheelchair.

Rogers majored in psychology at Baylor University and later earned a master's degree in history from Trinity University in San Antonio. He taught high school science for two years before entering Officer Candidate School.

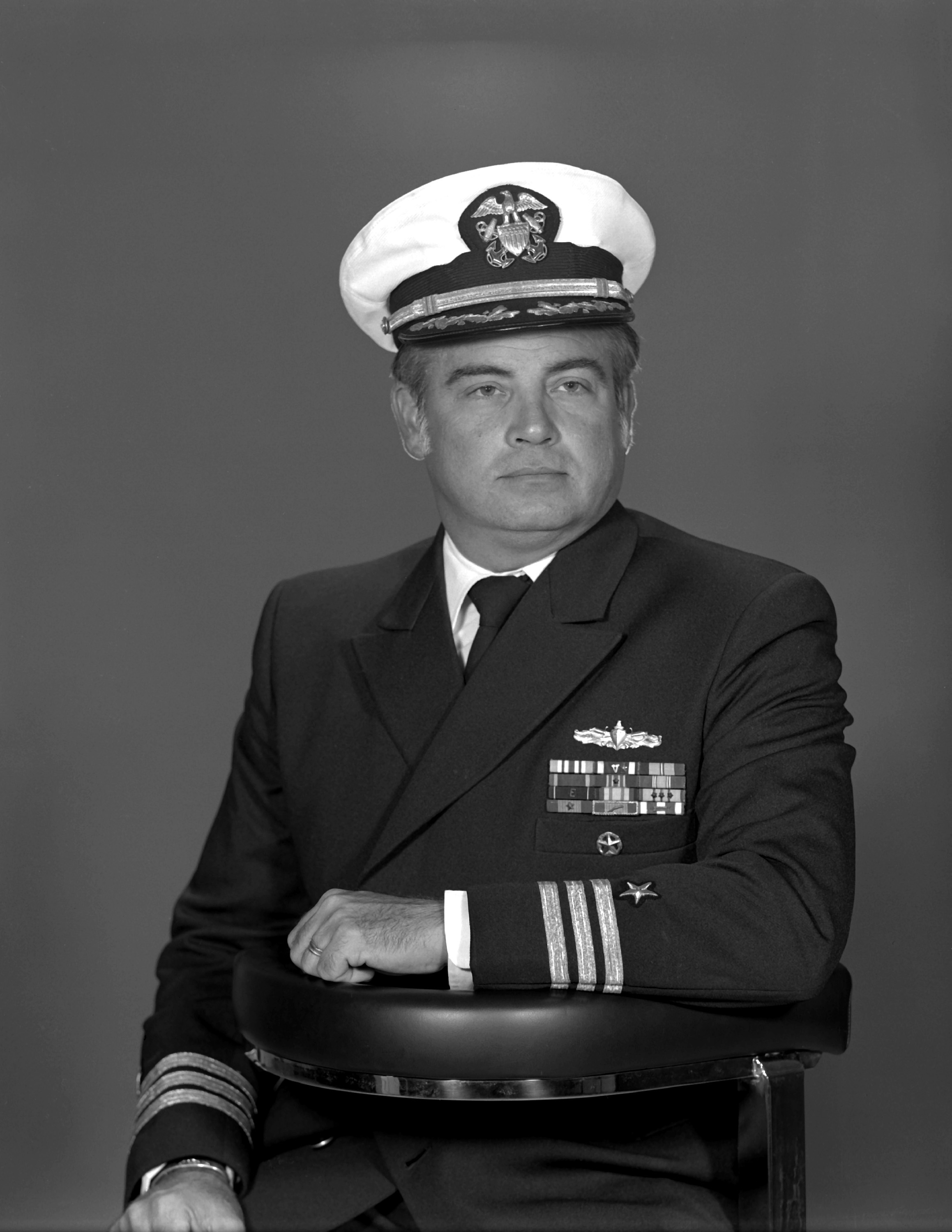
Rogers as commander in 1981

Rogers was commissioned in December 1965, and his first tour of duty was in the engineering department aboard the aircraft carrier USS Independence. His next assignment was aboard the USS George K. MacKenzie, a Gearing-class destroyer, initially stationed at Long Beach, California and later in Yokosuka, Japan. In December 1969, Rogers reported to USS Vreeland, a Knox-class frigate, where he served as commissioning operations officer. The ship was homeported in Charleston, South Carolina.

Rogers first command was USS Exploit, an Aggressive-class minesweeper, also homeported in Charleston. After attending the Armed Forces Staff College in Norfolk, Virginia, he served in Washington, D.C., working with three admirals and was assigned to the Weapons Systems Evaluation Group under the Secretary of Defense. This assignment includes multiple trips to Israel following the 1973 Yom Kippur War.

In 1978, Rogers reported to USS David R. Ray, a Spruance-class destroyer, as commissioning executive officer. He later commanded USS Cushing, another Spruance-class destroyer, from September 1981 to August 1984. Prior to his command of USS Vincennes, he served in the Pentagon as head of a section within the Planning Division of the Office of the Chief of Naval Operations.

Rogers married Sharon Loomis in Fort Worth, Texas, on July 12, 1964. The couple had one son, born February 1969.

== Commanding USS Vincennes ==
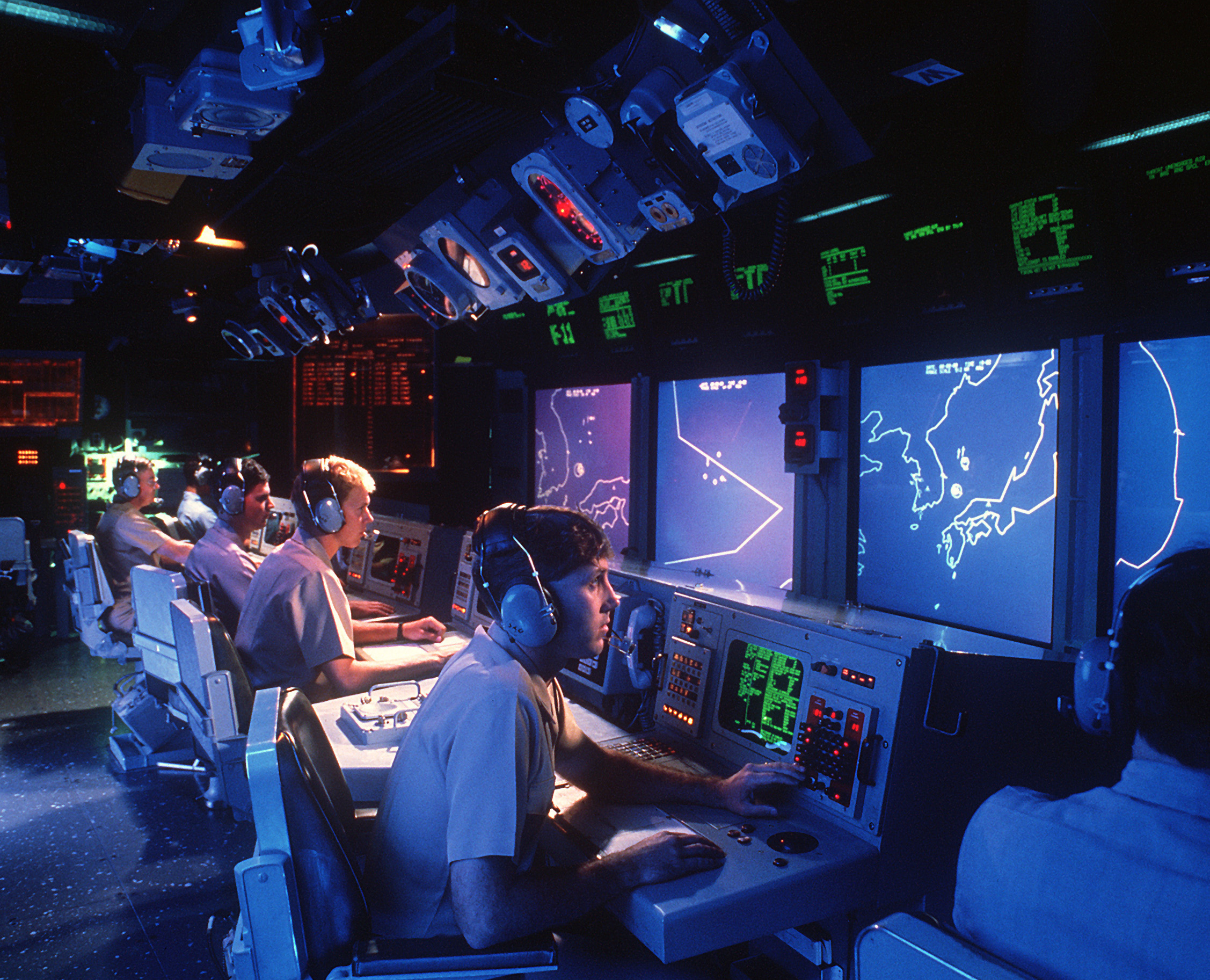
Large screen displays on USS Vincennes, circa 1988

Rogers was the second commanding officer of Vincennes and assumed command April 11, 1987. At the time, Vincennes was one of only five cruisers commissioned that carried the new Aegis combat system, a billion-dollar computerized integrated battle management system and the first such cruiser to join the Pacific fleet. The heart of Aegis is an advanced, automatic detect-and-track, multi-function three-dimensional phased array radar, the AN/SPY-1. Known as "the Shield of the Fleet", the high-powered radar is able to perform search, tracking, and missile guidance functions simultaneously with a track capacity of over 100 targets at more than 100 nautical miles (200 km). Command of an Aegis cruiser was considered to be very prestigious at the time. On April 25, 1988, Vincennes was deployed on a six-month cruise in support of Operation Earnest Will, the reflagging and escort of oil tankers in the Persian Gulf.

== Iran Air 655 ==
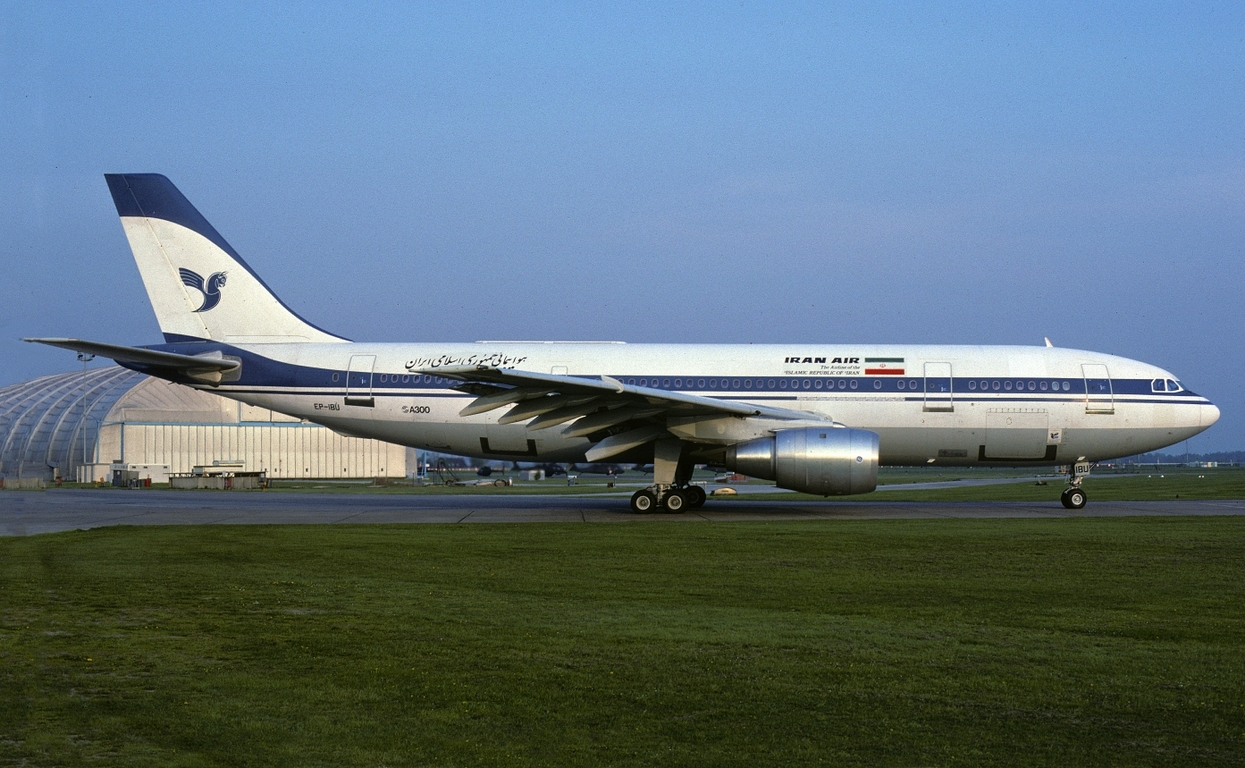
Iran Air Flight 655, the downed aircraft involved, pictured a year before the shootdown

On July 3, 1988, the USS Vincennes, under the command of Rogers, shot down Iran Air Flight 655, an Airbus A300, with two radar guided SM-2MR missiles. Iran Air Flight 655, carrying 290 occupants, had been airborne for seven minutes when the missiles hit approximately 8 miles (13 km) from the Vincennes. The airliner disintegrated mid-air and fell into the Persian Gulf, about 6.5 miles (10.5 km) east of Hengham Island (26°37.75′N 56°1′E). All 290 on board, including the 16 crew members, were killed. At the time of the downing, the Vincennes was inside Iranian territorial waters and was engaging in small arms combat with several Iranian surface craft, and the Vincennes received a report that one of its LAMPS III Seahawk helicopters had drawn warning fire during flight operations.

A subsequent US report by Rear Admiral William Fogarty, titled Formal Investigation into the Circumstances Surrounding the Downing of Iran Air Flight 655 on July 3, 1988, noted that Captain Rogers received some faulty information that he subsequently used to make the decision to fire on the plane. Specifically, he was told the aircraft was identified as an Iranian Air Force F-14 Tomcat descending in an attack profile, and that it was identifying itself with secondary surveillance radar / IFF mode-II codes exclusively used by military aircraft. The investigation noted that Rogers was focused on the ongoing surface engagement and was aware of the inbound aircraft for less than four minutes. The investigation also pointed out that Rogers thought that he had an increased burden to act since he was also assigned to protect the frigate USS Elmer Montgomery. The investigation concluded that Rogers acted in a prudent manner based on the information available to him, and the short time frame involved. He was also judged to have acted within the prescribed rules of engagement for USN warship captains in that situation.

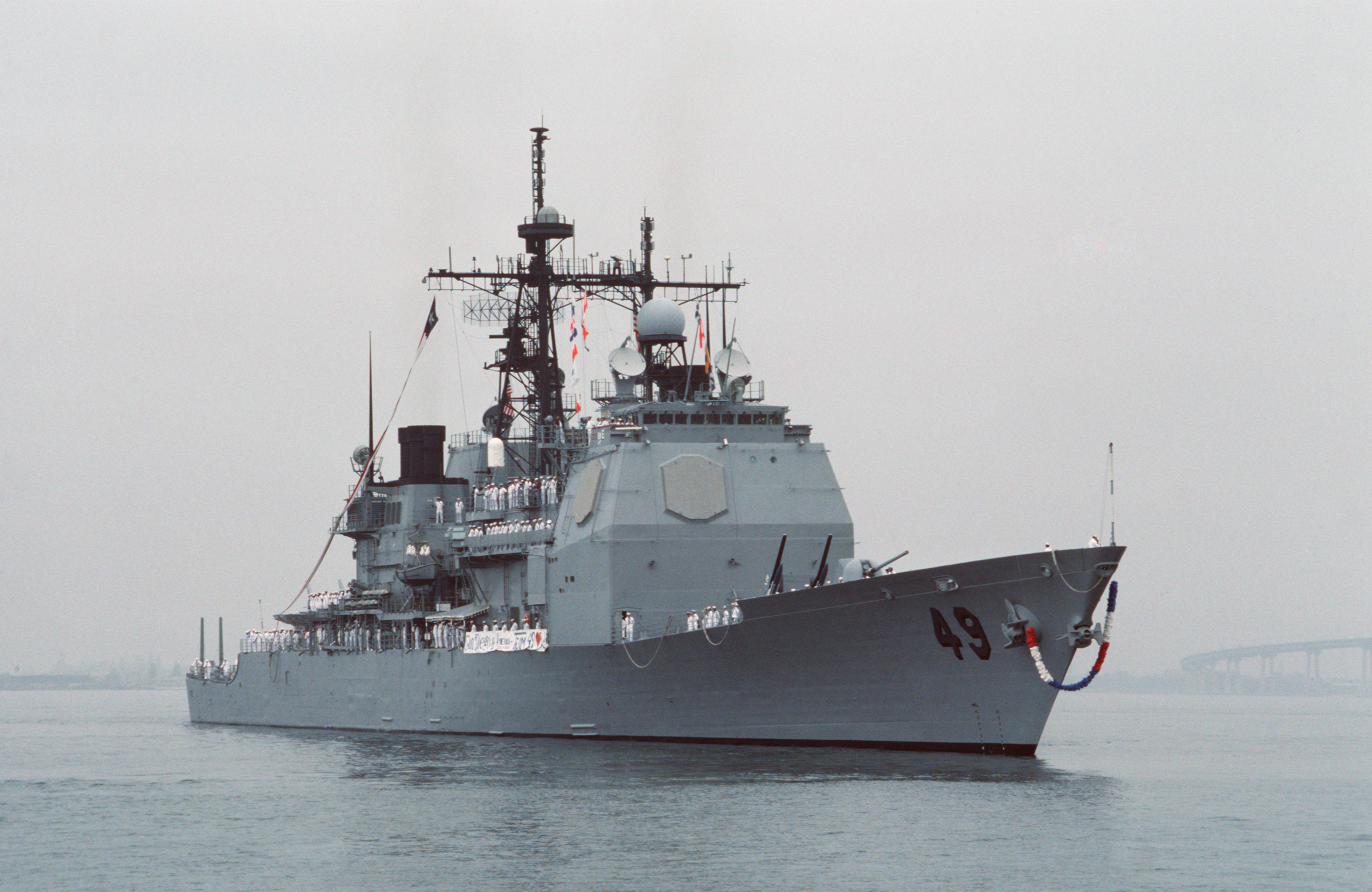
USS Vincennes returns to San Diego, October 1988.

Independent investigations into the incident have presented a different picture. John Barry and Roger Charles of Newsweek magazine claimed that Rogers was overeager for combat, that he started the fight with Iranian gunboats, and then followed them into Iranian territorial waters. Barry and Charles also accused the U.S. government of a cover-up.

Other sources lay some of the blame on the complexity of the AEGIS technology and the desire on the part of Captain Rogers to make use of it. An analysis of the events by the International Strategic Studies Association described the deployment of an Aegis cruiser into that zone as irresponsible, and the Association thought that the enormous cost of his warship had played a major part in setting a low threshold for Captain Rogers decision to open fire.

In 2004, Marita Turpin and Niek du Plooy of the Centre for Logistics and Decision Support partially attributed the accident to an expectancy bias introduced by the Aegis Combat System and faulted the design and "unhelpful user interface" as contributing to the errors of judgment.

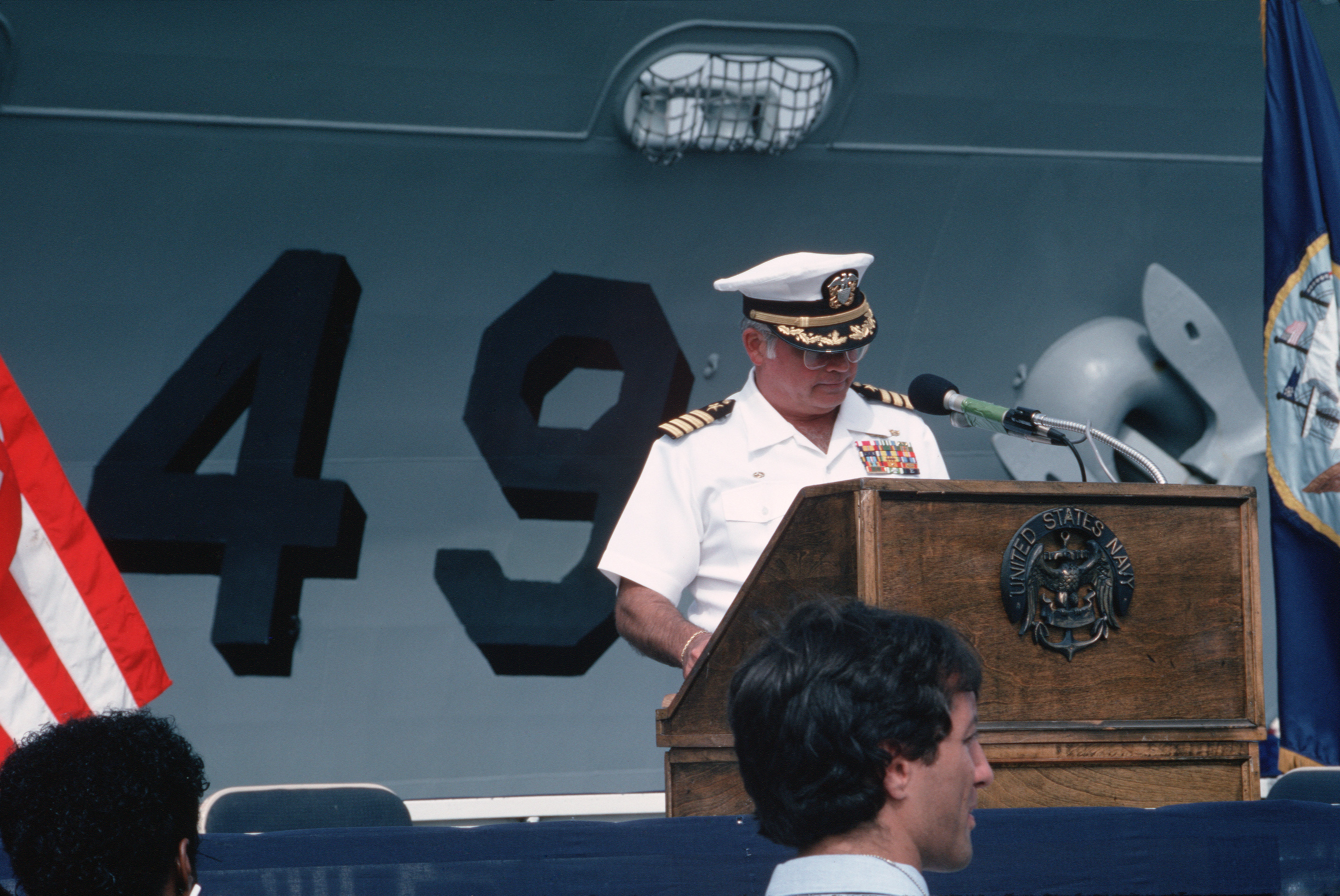
Rogers speaking at a USS Vincennes welcome home ceremony

Rogers was personally criticized for being overly aggressive by Commander David Carlson, commanding officer of USS Sides, a second ship that was under the tactical control of Rogers at the time of the incident. Carlson described the downing of the airliner as the "horrifying climax to Capt. Rogers' aggressiveness, first seen four weeks ago". He was referring to incidents on June 2, 1988, when he claimed that Rogers brought Vincennes too close to an Iranian frigate that was searching a bulk carrier, that he launched a helicopter too close to Iranian small boats, and that he fired upon a number of small Iranian military boats instead of directing another, smaller warship to do so. In disagreeing with Rogers' decision – citing the high cost of the cruiser relative to that of the frigates attached to the group – Carlson posited, "Why do you want an AEGIS cruiser out there shooting up boats? It wasn't a smart thing to do."

USS Vincennes, with Rogers remaining in command, completed the remainder of her scheduled deployment to the Pacific and Indian Oceans. During the voyage home on September 22, 1988, Vincennes rescued 26 Vietnamese boat people adrift in the South China Sea. The ship returned to Naval Station San Diego on October 25, 1988.

Rogers remained in command of USS Vincennes until May 27, 1989. In 1990, Captain Rogers was awarded the Legion of Merit decoration "for exceptionally meritorious conduct in the performance of outstanding service as commanding officer ... from April 1987 to May 1989." The award was given for his service as the Commanding Officer of Vincennes, and the citation made no mention of the downing of Iran Air 655.

== Bombing of Rogers' family minivan ==
Nine months after the downing of Iran Air Flight 655, on the morning of March 10, 1989, Rogers' wife Sharon, teaching at La Jolla Country Day School, escaped uninjured when a pipe bomb exploded and set fire to her minivan as she sat stopped at a red light across the street from the University Towne Center shopping mall in San Diego. The van was registered in the name of Will Rogers III, and many people at the time of the bombing suspected that terrorism was involved. The event made the school's headmaster pressure Mrs. Rogers into resigning, citing fears for student safety. Sharon Rogers became a spokeswoman for Crime Stoppers.

Five months later, the Associated Press reported that the Federal Bureau of Investigation (FBI) had shifted focus away from terrorism towards the possibility of someone with a personal vendetta against Captain Rogers. As of 2003, the bombing of Rogers' van remained an unsolved case, despite a major investigation involving at some time up to 300 police and FBI agents.

== Naval career following Vincennes ==
Rogers' next assignment was as commanding officer of the United States Navy Tactical Training Group at Naval Base Point Loma, a group responsible for training officers in handling combat situations. After being passed over for promotion to flag rank, he retired from the United States Navy in August 1991. In 1992, Rogers and his wife Sharon co-wrote a book, Storm Center: A Personal Account of Tragedy & Terrorism, which describes the events surrounding the downing of Iran Air 655 and the minivan bombing from their personal perspectives.

== Death ==
Mrs. Rogers died August 20, 2024. Rogers died on June 30, 2025, at the age of 86.
