= Ahmad Behbahani =

Iranian intelligence officer

Ahmad Behbahani (Persian: احمد بلادی بهبهانی) is a refugee who claimed to be a former Iranian intelligence officer, responsible for organizing terrorism abroad. He is known for his claim in 2000 that the Iranian government planned and sanctioned the Lockerbie disaster when Pan Am Flight 103 crashed on 21 December 1988, over the town of Lockerbie in Annandale, Scotland. He reportedly alleged that Iran acted in response to the destruction of Iran Air Flight 655 on 3 July 1988. The claim was made while he was a refugee in Turkey. Behbahani claimed that he brought a group of Libyans into Iran who underwent 90 days of training to prepare them to carry out the bombing.
