= Iran Air Flight 655 =

1988 aircraft shootdown over the Strait of Hormuz

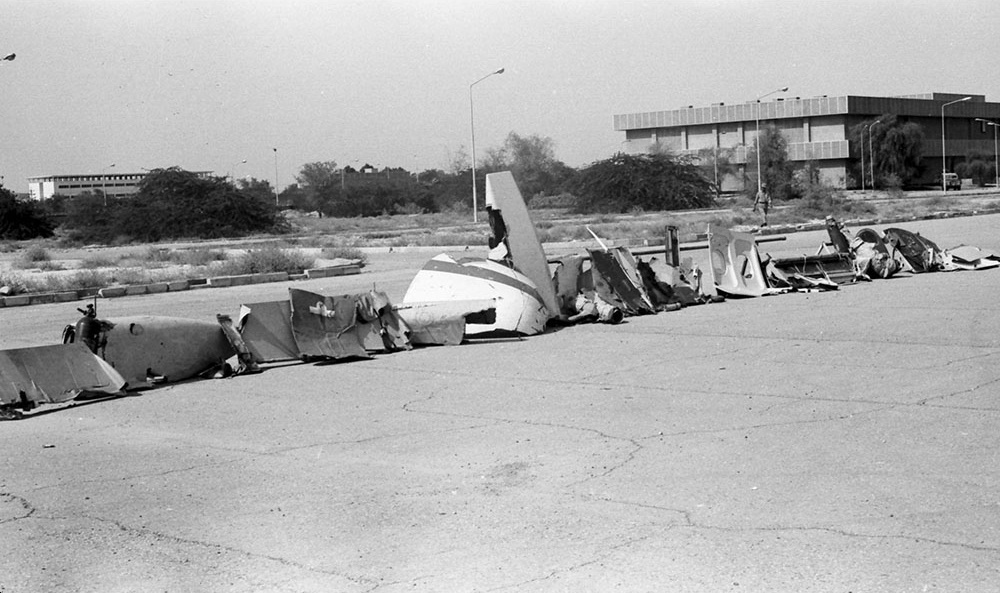
- Pieces of aircraft wreckage recovered from the Strait of Hormuz

Shootdown
- Date: 3 July 1988
- Summary: Shot down by a missile fired from USS Vincennes; reason for shootdown disputed
- Site: Strait of Hormuz, near Qeshm Island, Iran; 26°40′06″N 56°02′41″E

Aircraft
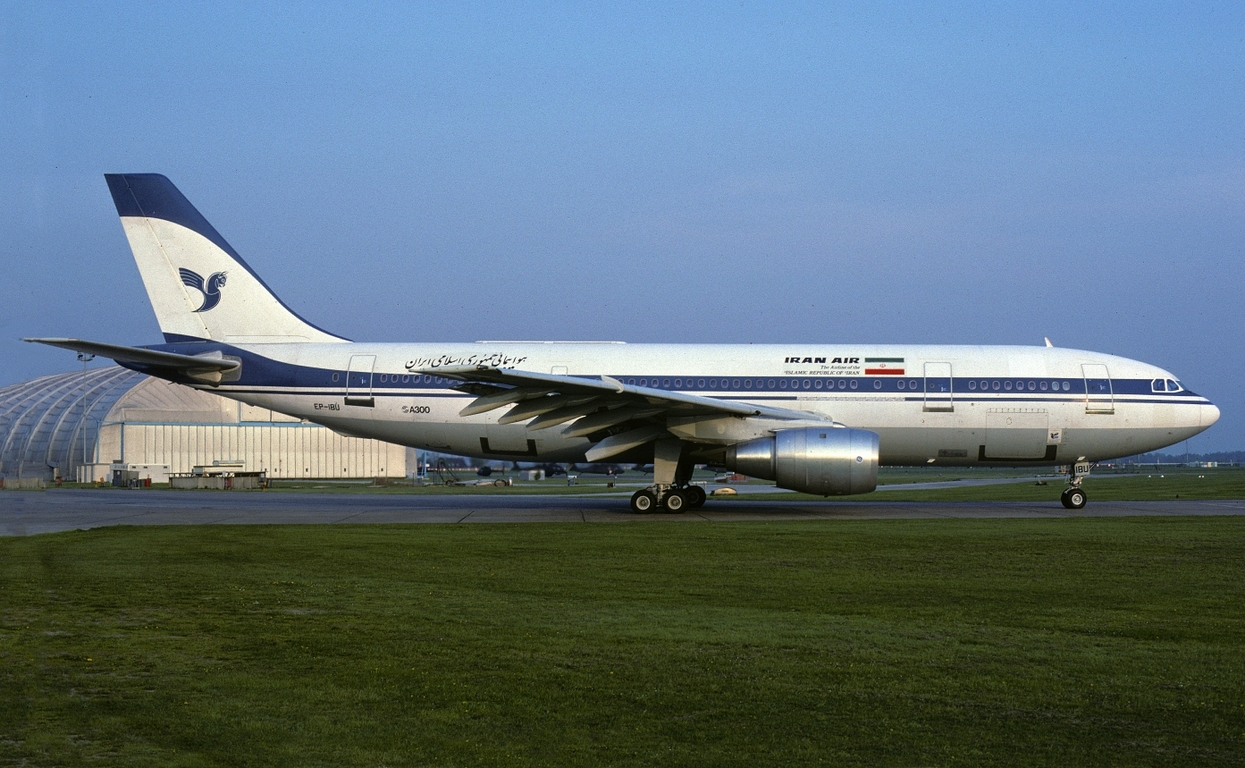
- EP-IBU, the aircraft involved, pictured in 1987
- Aircraft type: Airbus A300B2-203
- Operator: Iran Air
- IATA flight No.: IR655
- ICAO flight No.: IRA655
- Call sign: IRANAIR 655
- Registration: EP-IBU
- Flight origin: Mehrabad International Airport; Tehran, Iran
- Stopover: Bandar Abbas International Airport; Bandar Abbas, Iran
- Destination: Dubai International Airport; Dubai, United Arab Emirates
- Occupants: 290
- Passengers: 274
- Crew: 16
- Fatalities: 290
- Survivors: 0

Iran Air Flight 655 (Note: Persian: پرواز شماره ۶۵۵ ایران ایر) was an international scheduled passenger flight from Tehran to Dubai via Bandar Abbas that was shot down on 3 July 1988 by two surface-to-air missiles fired by USS Vincennes, a United States Navy warship. The missiles hit the Iran Air aircraft, an Airbus A300, while it was flying its usual route over Iran's territorial waters in the Persian Gulf, shortly after the flight departed its stopover location, Bandar Abbas International Airport. All 290 people on board were killed, making it one of the deadliest airliner shootdowns of all time, the deadliest aviation incident involving an Airbus aircraft of any type, and the deadliest aviation incident in Iranian history.

The shootdown occurred during the Iran–Iraq War, which had been ongoing for nearly eight years. Vincennes had entered Iranian territorial waters after one of its helicopters drew warning fire from Iranian speedboats operating within Iranian territorial limits. The reason for the downing has been disputed between the governments of the two countries.

According to the United States, Vincennes's crew misidentified the aircraft as an F-14 Tomcat, a US-made fighter jet part of the Iranian inventory, despite it transmitting civilian identification codes. They assert that Vincennes and other warships repeatedly tried to contact the aircraft on both civilian and military air distress frequencies, but received no response. Bandar Abbas acted as a joint civil/military airport, and Flight 655 had departed behind schedule. The Iranian government maintains that the US recklessly shot down the aircraft, violating international law, after repeatedly provoking the Iranian forces. Some analysts blamed the overly aggressive attitude of Vincennes's captain, William C. Rogers III, while others focused on more widespread issues and miscommunications on board. Despite the downing of the aircraft, Rogers received the Legion of Merit in 1990 for his "outstanding service as commanding officer".

The United States was criticized for the downing, especially in its initial response. Although not issuing a formal apology, US president Ronald Reagan issued a written diplomatic note to Iran, expressing deep regret. In 1996, both governments reached a settlement in the International Court of Justice in which the US agreed to pay US$61.8 million (equivalent to $127 million in 2025) on an ex gratia basis to the families of the victims and two A300B4-600 as compensation for Iran Air. As part of the settlement, the US did not admit liability for the shootdown.

== Background ==
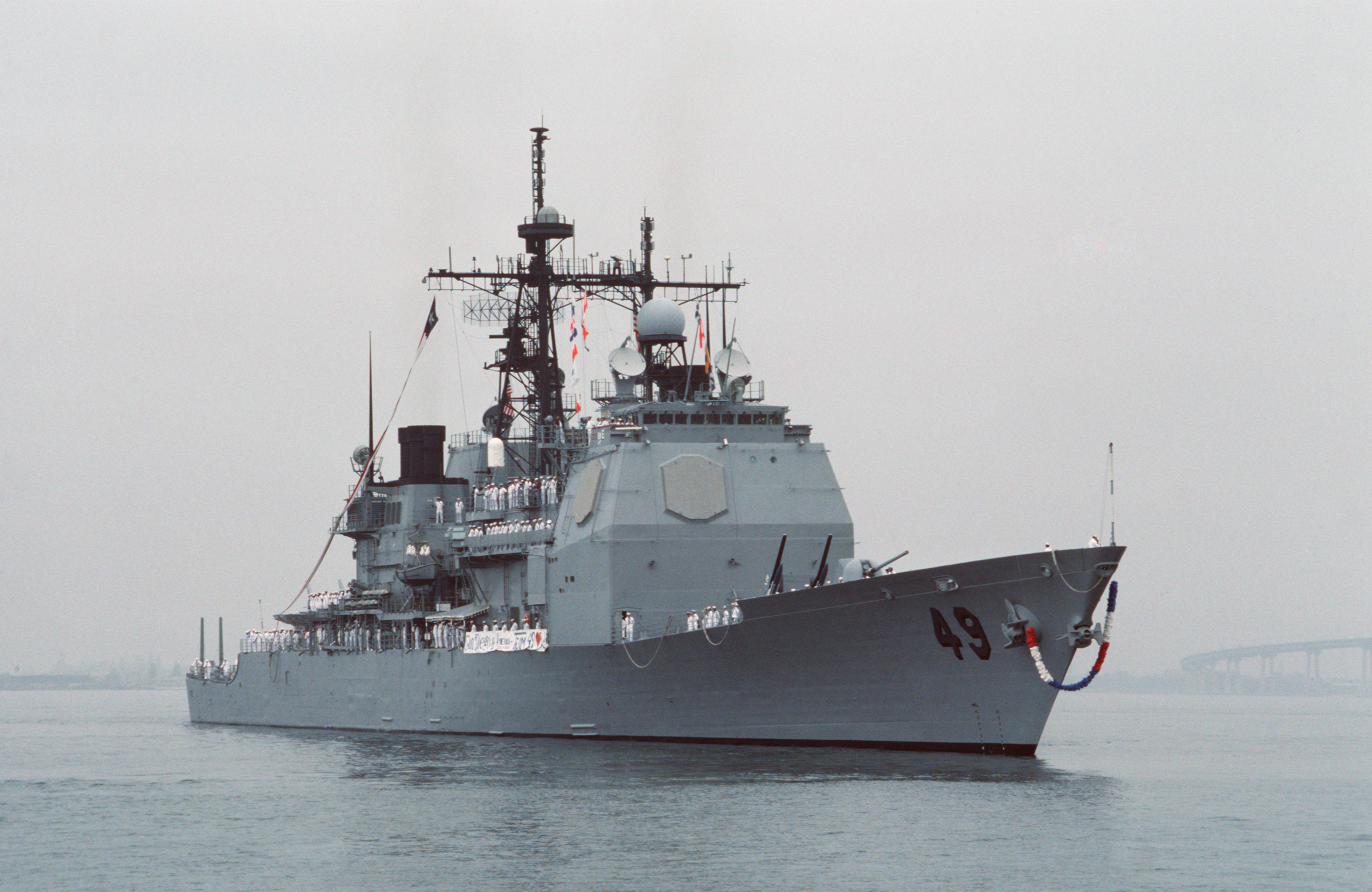
USS Vincennes had been deployed to the Persian Gulf to assist in oil tanker escorts.

By 1984, the war between Iraq and Iran had expanded to include air attacks against oil tankers and merchant shipping of neighboring countries, some of whom were providing aid to Iraq by shipping its oil. In 1987, a year preceding the shootdown, the Iraqi Air Force had attacked the US Navy frigate USS Stark, killing 37 American sailors, after misidentifying it as an Iranian warship. The Stark incident culminated in the widening of the US Navy rules of engagement in the Persian Gulf, allowing warships to attack aircraft before being attacked.

After a US oil tanker struck a mine in the Persian Gulf, additional warships were dispatched to the area; by late 1987, US forces had challenged and launched missiles at two Iranian fighter jets. In April 1988, the US engaged in Operation Praying Mantis in retaliation for mines, bringing significant damage to Iranian oil infrastructure and its military.

In response to the pattern of attacks on shipping, the US Joint Chiefs of Staff issued a 'Notice to Airmen' (NOTAM) on 8 September 1987, warning all Persian Gulf countries that civilian aircraft must monitor the International Air Distress frequencies and be prepared to identify themselves to US Navy ships and state their intentions; Iran disputed the validity and accuracy of these notices.

On the day of the incident, USS Vincennes, alongside USS Sides and USS Elmer Montgomery, had been assigned to take part in an escort traveling through the Strait of Hormuz. Vincennes was a Ticonderoga-class guided-missile cruiser, commissioned four years earlier, fitted with the then-new Aegis Combat System. With a crew of 400, it was under the command of Captain William C. Rogers III at the time of the shootdown. The Aegis system was capable of tracking multiple mobile targets simultaneously, both naval and airborne, and more importantly allowed rapid dissemination of information between different levels of the crew. Its crew was inexperienced in actual conflict, but had performed well in training scenarios.

At its narrowest point, the Strait of Hormuz is 21 nautical miles (39 km; 24 mi) wide. As a result, to traverse the strait, ships must stay within sea lanes that pass through the territorial waters of Iran and Oman. It is normal for ships, including warships, entering or leaving the Persian Gulf to transit Iranian territorial waters. During the Iran–Iraq War the Iranian forces frequently boarded and inspected neutral cargo ships in the Strait of Hormuz in search of contraband destined for Iraq. While legal under international law, these inspections added to the tensions in the area.

== Flight and shootdown ==
Flight 655's scheduled flight path through the A59 air corridor, which it was within (purple), and the route tracked by USS Vincennes (red)

The plane, an Airbus A300 (registered as EP-IBU), was under the control of 38-year-old Captain Mohsen Rezaian (Note: Persian: محسن رضائیان), a US-educated veteran pilot with 7,000 hours of flight time, including over 2,000 in an Airbus A300. The first officer was 31 years old and the flight engineer was 33 years old. All had at least 2,000 flight hours.

Flight 655 left Bandar Abbas at 10:17 Iran Standard Time (UTC+03:30), 27 minutes after its scheduled departure time due to an immigration issue. It should have been a 28-minute flight. Before takeoff from runway 21, it was directed by the Bandar Abbas tower to turn on its transponder and proceed over the Persian Gulf. The flight was assigned routinely to commercial air corridor Amber 59, a 20-mile-wide (32 km) lane on a direct line to Dubai airport. The short distance made for a simple flight pattern: climb to 14,000 feet (4,300 m), cruise, and descend into Dubai. The airliner was transmitting the correct transponder squawk code typical of a civilian aircraft and maintained radio contact in English with appropriate air traffic control facilities throughout the flight (see § Radio communication).

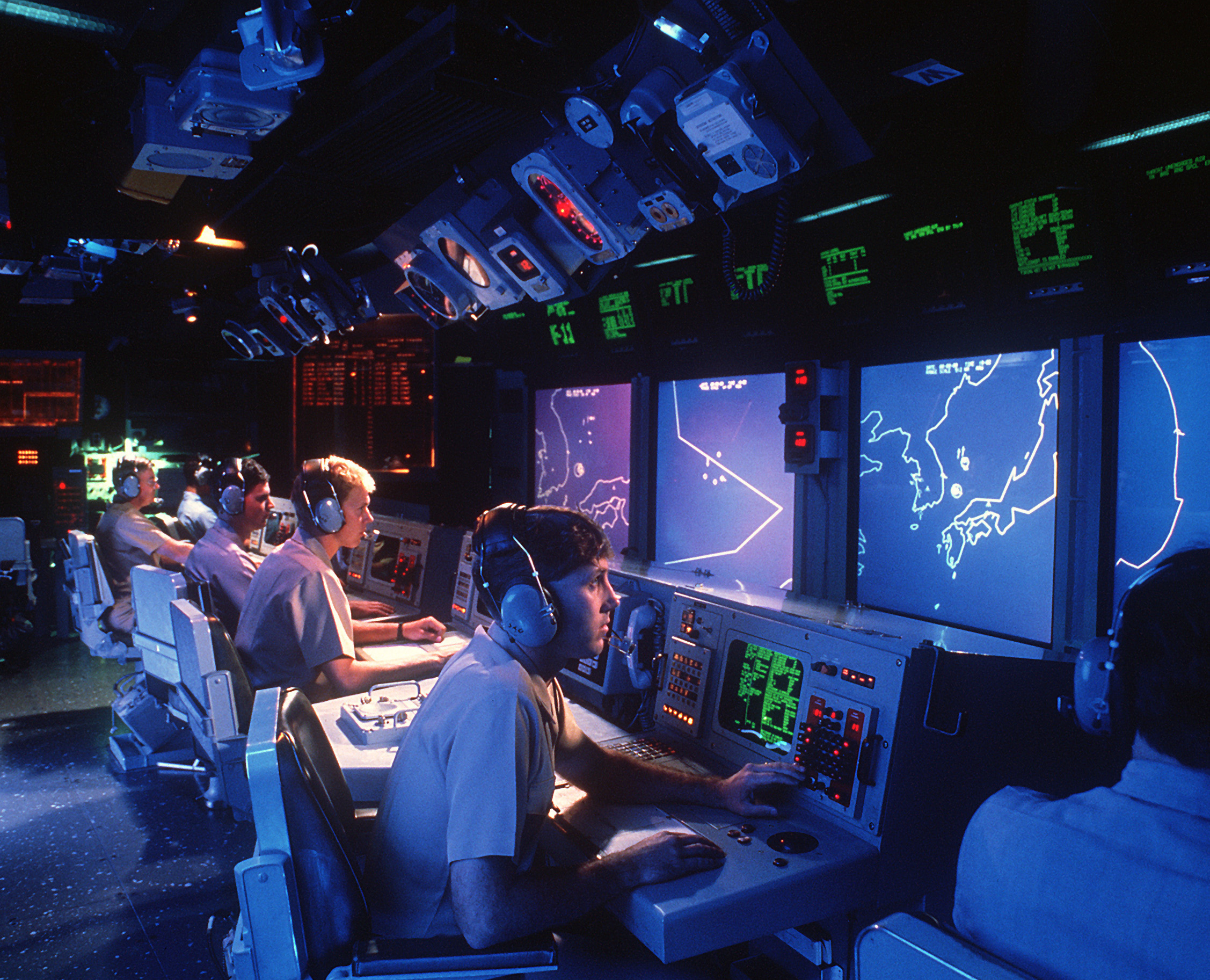
The Combat Information Center on board Vincennes

On the morning of 3 July 1988, Vincennes was passing through the Strait of Hormuz, returning from an oil tanker escort duty. A helicopter deployed from the cruiser reportedly received small arms fire from Iranian patrol vessels as it observed from high altitude. Vincennes moved to engage the vessels, in the course of which both sides violated Omani waters and left after being challenged by a Royal Navy of Oman patrol boat. Vincennes continued to pursue the Iranian gunboats, entering Iranian territorial waters. Two other US Navy ships, Sides and Elmer Montgomery, were nearby.

In the meantime, Flight 655, proceeding along its scheduled route, was on an ascending flight path towards Vincennes. In the time that followed (the details of which are debated, see below), Vincennes incorrectly assumed the aircraft to be hostile and issued 10 challenges to the airliner, seven on the Military Air Distress (MAD) frequency, and three on the International Air Distress (IAD) frequency. Sides additionally made one challenge on the civilian frequency after those of Vincennes. The aircraft was not equipped to receive military transmissions, and the civilian challenges received no responses. Subsequently, the crew of Vincennes commenced the process to engage the aircraft. Flight 655 made its final transmission at 10:24:11 to acknowledge a hand-off from Bandar Abbas approach controllers:

10:24:07 – Bandar Abbas Approach: "Iran Air 655 roger, contact Tehran Control 133.4, have a nice flight."
10:24:11 – IR655: "Thank you, good day."

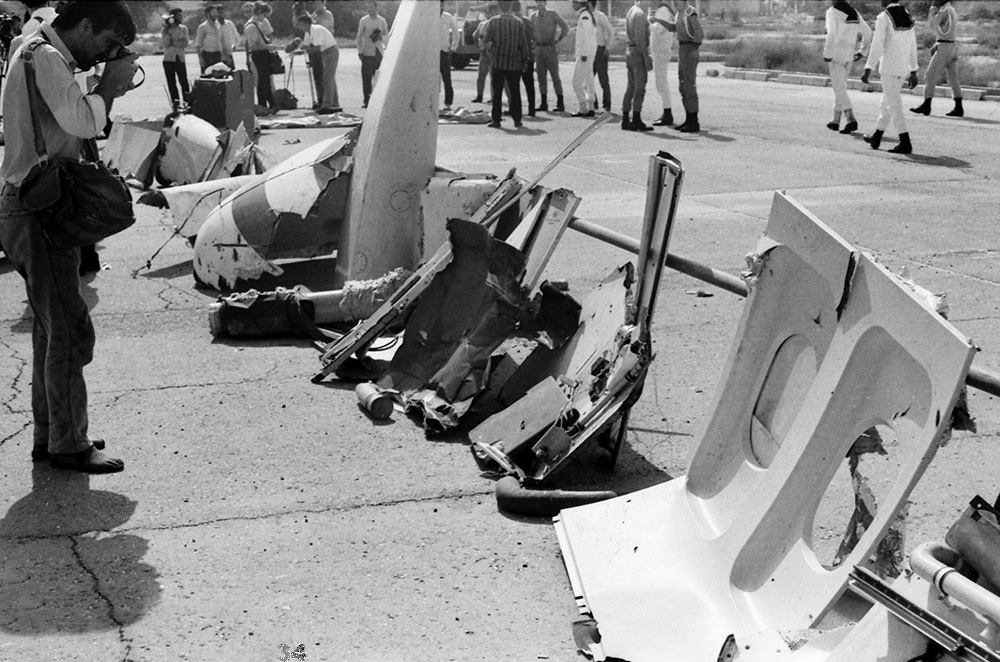
Part of the collected remains of Flight 655; much of the wreckage was never recovered

Eleven seconds later, at 10:24:22, with the aircraft at a range of 10 nautical miles (19 km; 12 mi), Vincennes fired two SM-2MR surface-to-air missiles. The first missile intercepted the airliner at 10:24:43 at a range of 8 nautical miles (15 km; 9.2 mi), and the second missile intercepted the airliner shortly after. The plane exploded, and immediately disintegrated into three pieces (cockpit, wing section, and the tail section) and soon crashed into the water. None of the 290 passengers and crew on board survived. Much of the wreckage, including the cockpit voice recorder and flight data recorder, was never recovered.

At the time the missiles were launched, Vincennes was located at 26°30′47″N 56°00′57″E, placing it within the twelve-nautical-mile (22 km; 14 mi) limit of Iranian territorial seas. The location of Vincennes in Iranian territorial waters at the time of the incident was admitted by the US government in legal briefs and publicly by Chairman of the Joint Chiefs of Staff, Admiral William J. Crowe, on Nightline in 1992.

=== Radio communication ===
The official International Civil Aviation Organization (ICAO) report stated that 11 attempts were made to contact Iran Air Flight 655 from Vincennes and Sides, seven on military frequencies and four on commercial frequencies, addressed to an "unidentified Iranian aircraft" and giving its speed as 350 knots (650 km/h; 400 mph), which was the ground speed of the aircraft their radar reported. Flight 655's crew, however, would have seen a speed of 300 knots (560 km/h; 350 mph) on their cockpit instruments, which was their indicated airspeed, possibly leading them to conclude that Vincennes was talking to another aircraft. Both Sides and Vincennes tried contacting Flight 655 on several civilian and military frequencies. The ICAO concluded that Flight 655's crew assumed the three calls they received before the missiles struck must have been directed at an Iranian P-3 Orion, which was also taking off from Bandar Abbas.

The crew likely were monitoring the civilian international air-distress (IAD) frequency at the time of the shootdown. In its report, the ICAO found, according to The New York Times, that "American warships in the Gulf had no equipment that allowed them to monitor civilian air traffic control radio frequencies", and had they had such capabilities air traffic control transmissions would have identified the flight. In its ICJ statement, Iran disputed this by claiming that the Department of Defense's report explicitly mentioned the Vincennes's VHF radio equipment that would have allowed it to monitor civilian air traffic control frequencies, as well as other US surveillance activities in the Persian Gulf region that would have alerted them of the aircraft's nature. The US objected to this claim, saying that most of its military vessels were only equipped with VHR radios capable of listening to the IAD frequency.

=== Victims ===
The aircraft was carrying 290 people: 274 passengers and a crew of 16. Of these 290, 254 were Iranian, 13 were Emirati, 10 were Indian, six were Pakistani, six were Yugoslavian, and one was Italian. 65 of the passengers were children.

=== US government accounts ===
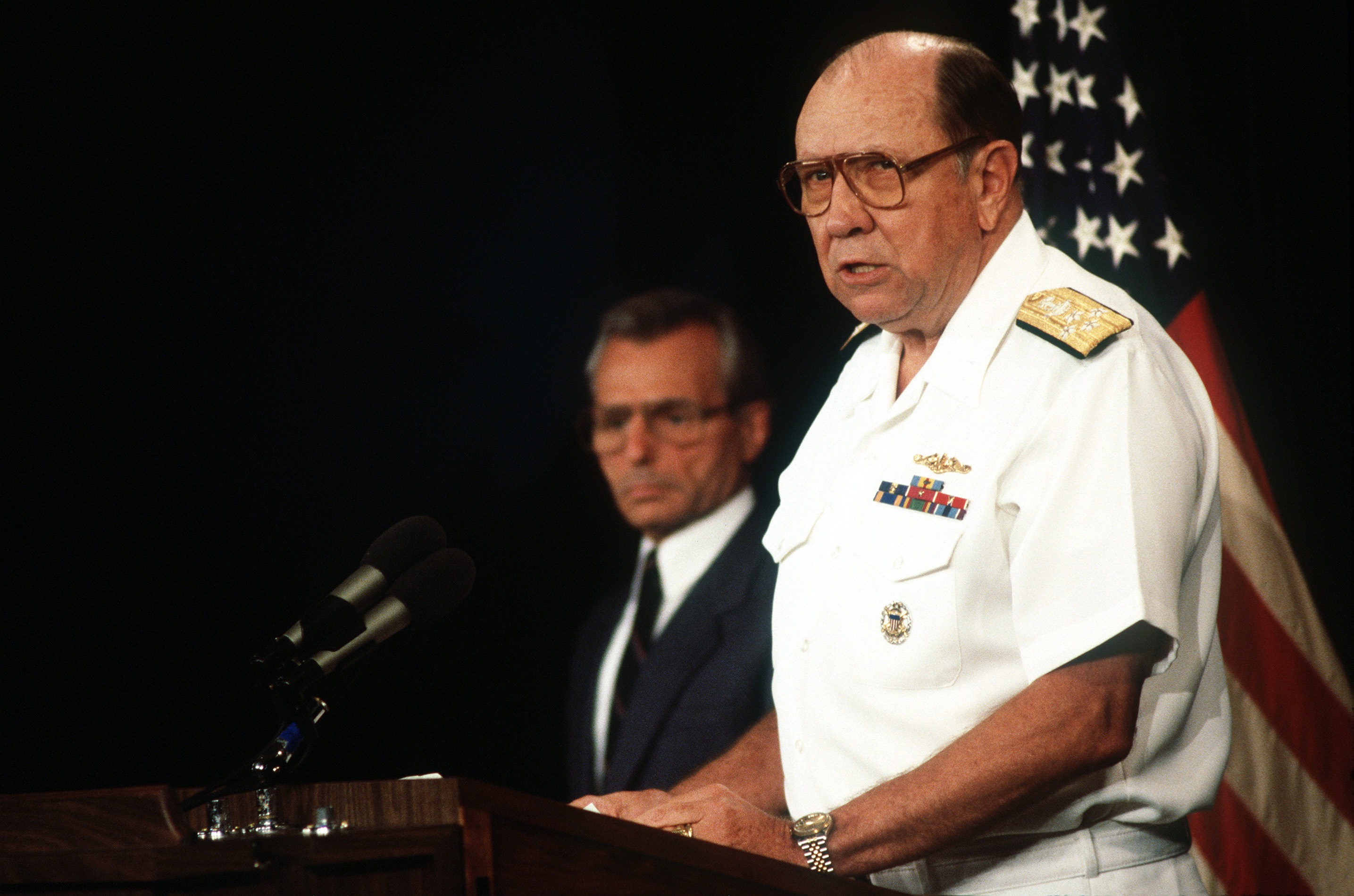
CJCS Admiral William Crowe (front) and US Secretary of Defense Frank Carlucci (back) brief media at the Pentagon.

According to the US government, Flight 655 was first detected immediately after take-off by Vincennes, transmitting IFF mode 3 (civilian). As the flight had originated at Bandar Abbas, which served both as a base for Iranian F-14 Tomcat operations and as a hub for commercial flights, all departing aircraft were by default "assumed hostile". When the identification supervisor responsible, Petty Officer Andrew Anderson, interrogated the aircraft again soon after with his IFF radio, he neglected to reset the range and received a short IFF mode 2 transmission (indicative of a military aircraft), likely from unrelated ground aircraft taking-off at Bandar Abbas. As a result, Flight 655 was erroneously tagged by Anderson with this military classification and squawk code. The mistagged squawk code corresponded to an F-14 that had flown out of Bandar Abbas a week before, leading the crew of Vincennes to believe the airliner was an Iranian fighter jet. For the entirety of its journey Flight 655 solely squawked civilian IFF codes. Due to the flight's slight delay, the dark environment of the Combat Information Center (CIC), and confusion over time zones, Anderson missed Flight 655 in commercial flight listings.

Escalations began when Vincennes's helicopter received warning fire after approaching close to Iranian gunboats, in contravention of the US rules of engagement at the time. According to the US, the gunboats had been following merchant ships in an aggressive manner and the helicopter had been deployed after they had been sighted by Montgomery. While Vincennes engaged with the gunboats, it entered Iranian territorial waters, with sharp turns causing disruption inside. In what the US government later termed "scenario fulfilment" – a form of confirmation bias in which personnel carry out a training scenario, believing it to be reality – information was erroneously communicated that not only was the aircraft squawking military codes, but that it was also descending on an attack profile. The Aegis system continued to correctly record the aircraft as climbing past 12,000 feet (3,700 m), instead, and this was reflected on the CIC's numerical displays. Captain Rogers had earlier acknowledged a remark that the aircraft was "possible COMAIR [commercial aviation]". Following the misidentification and unreciprocated radio challenges, the aircraft was shot down (see § Flight and shootdown).

Department of Defense (DoD) officials initially said that Vincennes had shot down an Iranian F-14, but issued a retraction within hours and confirmed Iranian reports that the target was instead a civilian Airbus. According to the DoD, Vincennes mistakenly identified the airliner as an attacking military fighter and misidentified its flight profile as being similar to that of an F-14A Tomcat during an attack run; however, the cruiser's Aegis Combat System recorded the plane's flight plan as climbing (not descending as in an attack run) at the time of the incident. Alongside the vague nature of the challenges issued by Vincennes, confusion may have arisen as the hailed speed stated in the transmissions was the ground speed, while the pilot's instruments displayed airspeed, a 50-knot (93 km/h; 58 mph) difference.

In 1992, journalists from Newsweek obtained a full copy of the DoD's internal report which included a map and coordinates of Vincennes. They concluded that Vincennes was about 4 kilometres (2.5 mi; 2.2 nmi) inside Iranian territorial waters at the time of the shootdown. This was admitted in a report by Admiral William Fogarty, entitled Formal Investigation into the Circumstances Surrounding the Downing of Iran Air Flight 655 on 3 July 1988 (the "Fogarty report"). The Fogarty report stated, "The data from USS Vincennes' tapes, information from USS Sides and reliable intelligence information, corroborate the fact that [Iran Air Flight 655] was on a normal commercial air flight plan profile, in the assigned airway, squawking Mode III 6760, on a continuous ascent in altitude from takeoff at Bandar Abbas to shoot-down.". The Fogarty report also claimed, "Iran must share the responsibility for the tragedy by hazarding one of their civilian airliners by allowing it to fly a relatively low-altitude air route in close proximity to hostilities that had been ongoing."

The crew of USS Sides – which issued one final challenge after the 10 of Vincennes – indicated that they had from take-off identified Flight 655 as a commercial flight, according to the ICAO. Unlike Vincennes, its operators recalled that they had never observed the IFF Mode 2 squawk that initially identified the flight as a military aircraft. Of the 11 challenges, only the one made by Sides identified the aircraft's squawk code.

=== Iranian government account ===
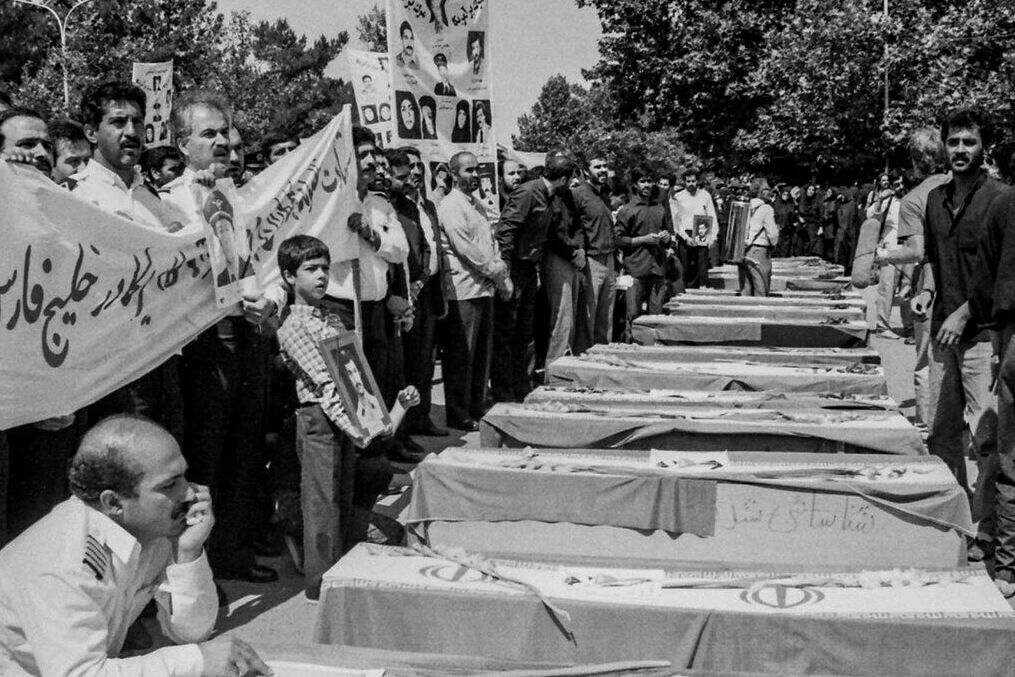
Iranians in Larestan County, Fars province, mourn those who died on board Flight 655.

"Iran Airbus Incident"
- UN Security Council discussion
- George H. W. Bush, Ali Akbar Velayati, and the rest of the United Nations Security Council discuss the shootdown, 14 July 1988

According to the Iranian government, the shootdown was both intentional and unlawful. Even if a mistaken identification was made – which Iran never accepted – it argued that this constituted negligence and recklessness amounting to an international crime, not an accident.

In particular, Iran expressed skepticism about claims of misidentification, noting that the cruiser's advanced Aegis radar correctly tracked the flight and its IFF mode 3 beacon; two other US warships in the area, Sides and Montgomery, also identified the aircraft as civilian; and the flight was well within a recognized international air corridor. It also noted that the crew of Vincennes were trained to handle simultaneous attacks by hundreds of enemy aircraft. Iran found it more plausible that Vincennes was looking for an opportunity to use its force, and that it had been predisposed to treat Iran as hostile, citing a statement by David Carlson, commander of USS Sides, published in the September 1989 issue of Proceedings in which he stated that Vincennes "hankered for an opportunity to show its stuff".

The US had previously issued a NOTAM, warning aircraft that they were at risk of "defensive measures" if they had not been cleared from a regional airport and if they came within 5 nautical miles (9.3 km; 5.8 mi) of a warship at an altitude less than 2,000 feet (610 m). Iran stated that Flight 655 had been cleared from a regional airport and was well outside those limits when it was shot down. The crew of the Vincennes had been incorrectly briefed that F-14s had been supplied to Iran with air-to-ground ordnance, when in reality they were only capable of air-to-air. Even if the plane had truly been an Iranian F-14, Iran argued that the US would not have had the right to shoot it down, as it was flying within Iranian airspace and did not follow a path that could be considered an attack profile, nor did it illuminate Vincennes with radar. Prior to the incident, Vincennes had entered Iranian territorial waters and was inside these waters when it launched its missiles. Even had the crew of Flight 655 made mistakes, they stated, the US government should remain responsible for the actions of Vincennes's crew, under international law.

Iran pointed out that in the past, "the United States has steadfastly condemned the shooting down of aircraft, whether civil or military, by the armed forces of another State" and cited El Al Flight 402, Libyan Arab Airlines Flight 114, and Korean Air Lines Flight 007, among other incidents. Iran also noted that when Iraq attacked USS Stark, the US found Iraq fully responsible on the grounds that the Iraqi pilot "knew or should have known" he was attacking a US warship. Speaking to the United Nations Security Council, Ali Akbar Velayati, Iran's minister of foreign affairs, called the shootdown the "most inhuman military attack in the history of civil aviation", caused by a "reckless and incompetent naval force".

=== Independent sources ===
In 1989, prior to the public exposure of Vincennes' position inside Iranian waters on Nightline by Admiral William Crowe, Professor Andreas Lowenfeld of the editing board of the American Journal of International Law criticized the official US position that the US was not legally liable for the incident:

I do not understand Maier's argument at all ... But the correct legal principle, I am clear, is not as Sofaer and Maier would have it—no legal liability to victims of airplane disasters without proof of fault beyond a reasonable doubt, and no fault in combat zones—but rather liability regardless of fault, so long as the cause is established, as it clearly was in the case of Iran Air 655, as in the case of Korean Air Lines 007. I would have hoped that those who spoke for the United States about the tragedy of 3 July 1988, from the President on down, would have recognized this principle, so essential for the safety of civil aviation, as other spokesmen for the United States and its allies have done when other states' military (whether or not on orders from on high) brought down civilian aircraft that may have strayed off course. ... That principle, it is clear, was breached by the United States in the case of Iran Air 655, and it follows that the United States is responsible. To say that is not to condemn the United States or even to find fault. It is simply to state that responsibility flows from the action itself.

Lowenfeld also pointed out that the amount of compensation paid for Iranian victims was one-tenth the amount demanded from Iraq for American dead aboard USS Stark.

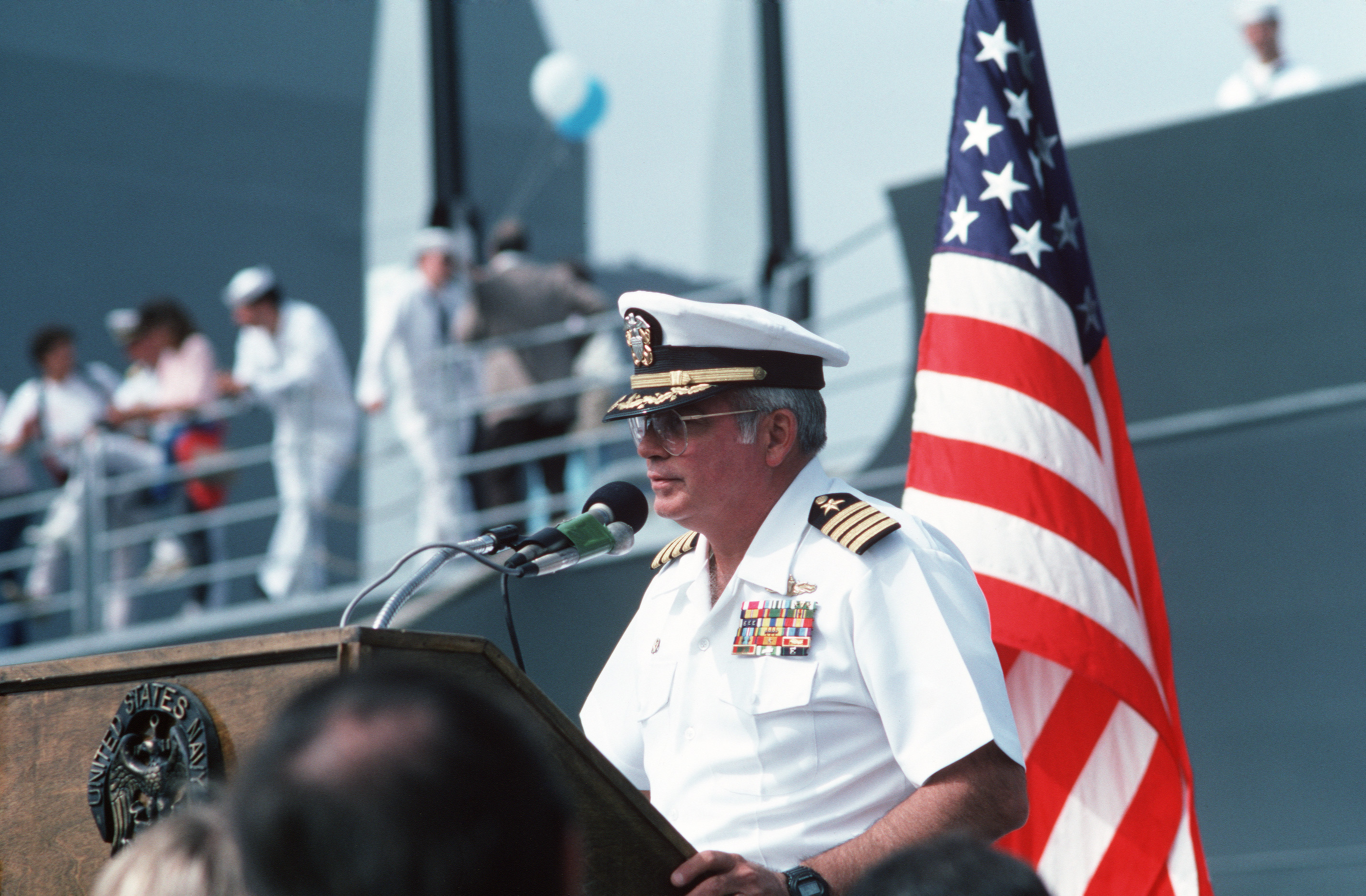
Captain of USS Vincennes William C. Rogers III

One legal scholar noted in the Yale Journal of International Law: "The downing of Flight 655 should not be deemed lawful merely because the Vincennes' commanding officer reasonably mistook the situation as presenting an integrated surface and air attack. Reconceptualizing the incident as a mistake problem does not excuse the Vincennes from liability."

In an article published in Newsweek on 13 July 1992, John Barry and Roger Charles argued that Rogers behaved recklessly and without due care. The Newsweek article also accused the US government of a cover-up; Admiral Crowe denied any knowledge: An analysis of the events by the International Strategic Studies Association described the deployment of an Aegis cruiser in the zone as irresponsible and felt that the value placed on Aegis cruisers by the US Navy had played a major part in the setting of a low threshold for opening fire. Vincennes had been nicknamed "RoboCruiser" by crew members and other US Navy ships, in reference to both its Aegis system and the supposed aggressive tendencies of its captain.

The International Court of Justice case relating to "the Aerial Incident of July 3, 1988" (Islamic Republic of Iran v. United States of America), was dropped on 22 February 1996 following settlement and compensation by the United States.

Three years after the incident, Admiral Crowe admitted on American television show Nightline that Vincennes was inside Iranian territorial waters when it launched the missiles, contradicting earlier Navy statements. The ICAO report of December 1988 placed Vincennes well inside Iran's territorial waters.

Commander David Carlson, commanding officer of USS Sides, the warship stationed nearest to Vincennes at the time of the incident, is reported to have said that the destruction of the aircraft "marked the horrifying climax to Captain Rogers's aggressiveness, first seen four weeks ago". His comment referred to incidents on 2 June, when Rogers had sailed Vincennes too close to an Iranian frigate undertaking a lawful search of a bulk carrier, launched a helicopter within two to three miles (3.2 to 4.8 km) of a small Iranian craft despite rules of engagement requiring a four-mile (6.4 km) separation, and opened fire on small Iranian military boats. Of those incidents, Carlson commented:

"Why do you want an Aegis cruiser out there shooting up boats? It wasn't a smart thing to do."

He said that Iranian forces he had encountered in the area a month prior to the incident were "pointedly non-threatening" and professional. At the time of Rogers's announcement to higher command that he was going to shoot down the plane, Carlson is reported to have been thunderstruck:

"I said to folks around me, 'Why, what the hell is he doing?' I went through the drill again. F-14. He's climbing. By now this damn thing is at 7,000 feet [2,133 meters]."

Carlson thought the Vincennes might have more information and was unaware that Rogers had been wrongly informed that the plane was diving. Carlson is reported to have written in the US Naval Proceedings that he had "wondered aloud in disbelief" on hearing of Vincennes' intentions. In speculating on the "climate" that led up to the incident, Carlson stated that the crew of Vincennes "felt a need to prove the viability of Aegis in the Persian Gulf, and that they hankered for the opportunity to show their stuff."

== Potential factors ==
- The Aegis System software at that time reused tracking numbers in its display, constituting a user interface design flaw. The Aegis software initially assigned the on-screen identifier TN4474 to Flight 655. Before Vincennes fired, the Aegis software switched the Flight 655 tracking number to TN4131 and recycled Flight 655's old tracking number of TN4474 to label a fighter jet 110 miles away. When the captain asked for a status on TN4474, he was told it was a fighter and descending. Scientific American rated it as one of the worst user interface disasters.
- A psychological evaluation of the crew, requested by Admiral Fogarty, concluded that stress and inexperience of the crew in warfare resulted in misjudgment and unconscious distortion of data, which played a significant role in the misinterpretation of the data of the Aegis system.
- The ship's crew did not efficiently consult commercial airliner schedules, due to the darkness of their working space and confusion over to which time zone the schedules referred—the scheduled flight times used Bandar Abbas airport time, while Vincennes was on Bahrain time. The airliner's departure was 27 minutes later than scheduled. The Combat Information Center was dark, and its lights flickered every time Vincennes fired at the speedboats. Petty Officer Andrew Anderson, who first picked up Flight 655 on radar and thought it might be a commercial aircraft, is said to have missed the flight as he was searching in the navy's listing of commercial flights.
- An Iranian P-3 Orion was in the area some time before the attack, and some reports explained why no radar signals were detected from Iran Air Flight 655. Other reports state that the Airbus was immediately detected after takeoff by the cruiser's AN/SPY-1 radar at a range of 47 miles (76 km).
- According to Capt. Richard McKenna (surface commander of Capt. Will Rogers), Vincennes was initially authorized to send a helicopter to investigate the situation with the gun boats. Later on, when he realized that Vincennes had turned north and swapped positions with Montgomery, he commanded Vincennes to leave the helicopter in place and return immediately. According to an interview after his retirement, Capt. McKenna believed that he felt the situation was not initially out of control and maybe Vincennes was looking for trouble. He said "my own personal opinion is it really did feel that they were looking for action when they went to see the Elmer Montgomery, um my own feeling is that the situation was not out of control, it was really my call and yet even though they were assigned another station, they took it upon themselves to be there and to that extent I feel that you know, I mean that's that's where the general feeling and not not just my own, comes that maybe they were looking for trouble."
- The psychology and mindset after engaging in a battle with Iranian gunboats. Claims were made that Vincennes was engaged in an operation using a decoy cargo ship to lure Iranian gunboats to a fight. These claims were denied by Fogarty in Hearing Before The Investigation Subcommittee and the Defense Policy Panel of the Committee on Armed Services, House of Representatives, One Hundred Second Congress, Second Session, 21 July 1992. Also, the initial claims of Vincennes being called for help by a cargo ship attacked by Iranian gunboats have been ruled out. That leads to claims that the Iranian gunboats were provoked by helicopters inside Iranian waters, not the other way around.

== Aftermath ==
Dispatch from Rogers to his commander

This is a burden I will carry for the rest of my life, but under the circumstances and considering all the information available to me at the moment, I took this action to defend my ship and my crew.

I and I alone am fully responsible for any actions taken by the Vincennes.

— William C. Rogers III, 4 July 1988

The event sparked an intense international controversy, with the US criticized for its account. In mid-July 1988, Iranian Foreign Minister Ali Akbar Velayati asked the United Nations Security Council to condemn the United States, saying the attack "could not have been a mistake" and was a "criminal act", a "massacre", and an "atrocity". George H. W. Bush, then-vice-president of the United States in the Reagan administration, defended his country at the UN by arguing that the US attack had been a wartime incident and the crew of Vincennes had acted appropriately to the situation. The Soviet Union asked the US to withdraw from the area and supported efforts by the Security Council to end the Iran–Iraq War. Most of the remainder of the 13 delegates who spoke supported the U.S. position, saying one of the problems was that a 1987 resolution to end the Iran–Iraq war had been ignored. Following the debate, Security Council Resolution 616 was passed expressing "deep distress" over the US attack and "profound regret" for the loss of human lives, and stressing the need to end the Iran–Iraq War as resolved in 1987.

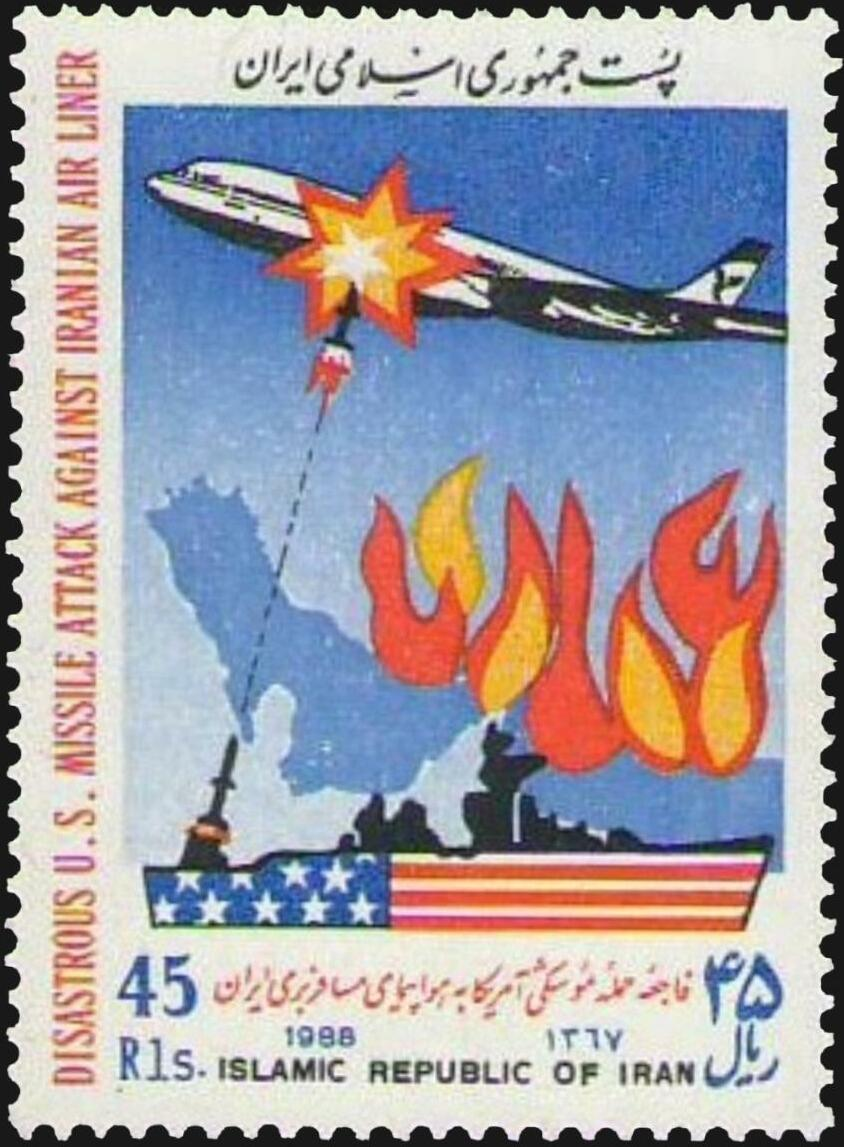
Iranian postage stamp issued 11 August 1988

Inside Iran, the shootdown was perceived as a purposeful attack by the United States, signaling that the US was about to enter into a direct war against Iran on the side of Iraq. A day of mourning was declared by the authorities, coinciding with the American Independence Day.

In February 1996, the US agreed to pay Iran US$131.8 million in settlement to discontinue a case brought by Iran in 1989 against the US in the International Court of Justice relating to this incident, together with other earlier claims before the Iran–United States Claims Tribunal. US$61.8 million of the claim was in compensation for the 248 Iranians killed in the shootdown: $300,000 per wage-earning victim and $150,000 per non-wage-earner. As part of the settlement, the US agreed to send Iran two Airbus A300-600s, the first Western planes to be supplied to the country since 1980 (after the 1979 Iranian revolution). They remained Iran's newest Western aircraft until some sanctions were lifted in 2017.

The US government issued notes of regret for the loss of human lives, but never formally apologized or acknowledged wrongdoing. On 5 July 1988, President Ronald Reagan expressed regret; when directly asked if he considered the statement an apology, Reagan replied, "Yes." George H. W. Bush, then vice-president of the United States, commented on another occasion, in a televised recording, while addressing a group of Republican ethnic leaders during the 1988 presidential campaign: "I will never apologize for the United States—I don't care what the facts are ... I'm not an apologize-for-America kind of guy." The quote, although unrelated to the downing of the Iranian airliner and not in any official capacity, has been attributed as such.

The incident overshadowed Iran–United States relations for many years. Former CIA analyst Kenneth M. Pollack wrote: "The shoot-down of Iran Air Flight 655 was an accident, but that is not how it was seen in Tehran." Following the explosion of Pan Am Flight 103 five months later, the United States government initially blamed the PFLP-GC, a Palestinian militant group backed by Syria, with assumptions of assistance from Iran in retaliation for Flight 655. The distrust generated between the US and Iran as a result of the downing of Iran Air Flight 655 was a challenge in the development of the Joint Comprehensive Plan of Action (JCPOA), also known as the Iran Nuclear Deal, which was agreed to on 14 July 2015.

=== Criticism of US media coverage ===
Newsweek covers for 12 September 1983 (left) and 18 July 1988, illustrating the KAL007 and Iran Air incidents, respectively. The caption "Murder in the Air" framed the KAL incident as a deliberate act of war, whereas in "Why It Happened", Henry Kissinger frames the Iran Air incident as a tragic mistake.

In 1991, political scientist Robert Entman of George Washington University compared US media coverage of the incident with the similar shootdown of Korean Air Lines Flight 007 by the Soviet Union five years earlier by studying material from Time, Newsweek, The New York Times, The Washington Post, and CBS Evening News. According to Entman, framing techniques were used to frame the Korean Airlines incident as sabotage, while framing the Iran Air incident as a tragic mistake, stating "the angle taken by the US media emphasized the moral bankruptcy and guilt of the perpetrating nation. With Iran Air 655, the frame de-emphasised guilt and focused on the complex problems of operating military high technology." (Note: The term frame here and in this cited supporting source refers to Entman, Robert M. (December 1991). "Framing US coverage of international news: Contrasts in narratives of the KAL and Iran Air incidents". Journal of Communication. 41 (44): 6–27. doi:10.1111/j.1460-2466.1991.tb02328.x. S2CID 53817259.. That article examines what it describes "as contrasting news frames employed by several important US media outlets" in covering the downings of the KAL-007 and Iran Air 655 airline flights.) By "de-emphasizing the agency and the victims and by the choice of graphics and adjectives, the news stories about the US downing of an Iranian plane called it a technical problem while the Soviet downing of a Korean jet was portrayed as a moral outrage." Entman included polling that appeared to show that the unbalanced coverage swayed public opinion against the Soviet Union and Iran.

In July 2014, when Malaysia Airlines Flight 17 was shot down over eastern Ukraine by Russian-backed insurgents, some commentators noted the discrepancy between the US official position and media coverage of the two similar incidents.

=== Post-tour of duty medals ===
Despite the downing of the plane, the crew of USS Vincennes were awarded Combat Action Ribbons for completion of their tours in a combat zone. The air warfare coordinator on duty received the Navy Commendation Medal, but The Washington Post reported in 1990 that the awards were for his entire tour from 1984 to 1988 and not for his actions relating to the surface engagement with Iranian gunboats. Rogers was awarded the Legion of Merit "for exceptionally meritorious conduct in the performance of outstanding service as commanding officer [...] from April 1987 to May 1989". The award was given for his service as the commanding officer of Vincennes from April 1987 to May 1989. The citation made no mention of the downing of Flight 655.

== In popular culture ==
The events of Flight 655 were featured in "Mistaken Identity", a season 3 episode of the Canadian TV series Mayday (called Air Emergency and Air Disasters in the US, and Air Crash Investigation in the UK).

In the 2024 novel Martyr! by Kaveh Akbar, the main character's mother dies on Flight 655. During the 2026 Iran war, Explosive Media released an AI-generated video lambasting the United States for its historical war crimes and civil rights violations; among them was the shootdown of Flight 655.

== See also ==
- List of airliner shootdown incidents
- Korean Air Lines Flight 007
- Malaysia Airlines Flight 17 - similar incident but shot down by Russian-backed Ukrainian separatists
- Ukraine International Airlines Flight 752 - similar incident but shot down by IRGC

== Notes and references ==
Notes

== Bibliography ==
- Barry, John; Charles, Roger (13 July 1992). "Sea of Lies". Newsweek. Vol. 120, no. 2. pp. 29–39. Also available at newsweek.com, without page numbers.
- Farrokh, Kaveh (2011). Iran at War, 1500-1988. Oxford: Osprey Publishing. ISBN 9781780962214. OCLC 773578413.
- Fogarty, William M. (1988). Investigation report: Formal investigation into the circumstances surrounding the downing of Iran Air Flight 655 on July 3, 1988 (PDF) (Report). United States Department of Defense.
- Report of ICAO fact-finding investigation (Report). Montreal: International Civil Aviation Organization. 1988. Archived from the original on 16 July 2024.
  - Alternatively, in order to access the report, visit the ICAO website, press Query in the header followed by Execute. Enter "01/01/1988" as value one and "01/01/1989" as value two and press OK. Press the view icon to see the report.
- Islamic Republic of Iran (24 July 1990). "Aerial Incident of 3 July 1988 (Islamic Republic of Iran v. United States of America) – Iranian submission" (PDF). International Court of Justice.
- Kelley, Stephen Andrew (2007). "Better Lucky Than Good: Operation Earnest Will as Gunboat Diplomacy" (PDF). Naval Postgraduate School. OCLC 156993037. Archived from the original (PDF) on 23 August 2007.
- Razoux, Pierre (2015). The Iran–Iraq War. Translated by Elliott, Nicholas. Cambridge, Massachusetts: Harvard University Press. ISBN 9780674088634. OCLC 907204345.
- United States of America (4 March 1991). Aerial Incident of 3 July 1988 (Islamic Republic of Iran v. United States of America) – Preliminary Objections submitted by the United States of America. International Court of Justice. (uses non-bracketed page numbers)
- Zatarain, Lee Allen (2010) [First published 2008 as 'Tanker War: America's First Conflict with Iran, 1987–88']. America's First Clash with Iran: The Tanker War, 1987–88. Havertown, Pennsylvania: Casemate Publishers. ISBN 978-1-935149-36-1. OCLC 635489155.
