= USS Vincennes (CG-49) =

Ticonderoga-class cruiser

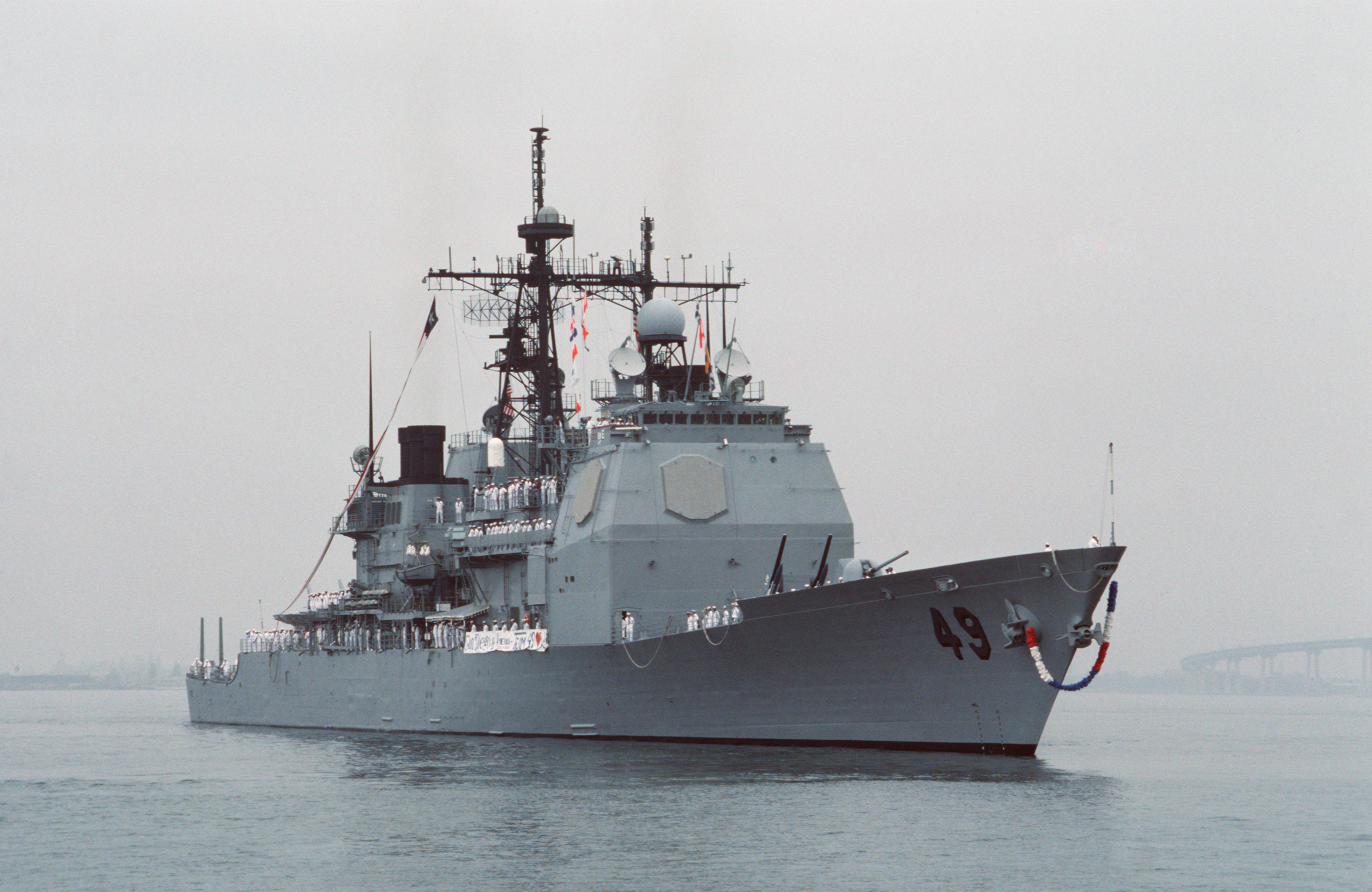
- USS Vincennes in San Diego on 24 October 1988

History

United States
- Name: Vincennes
- Namesake: Battle of Vincennes
- Ordered: 28 August 1981
- Builder: Ingalls Shipbuilding
- Laid down: 19 October 1982
- Launched: 14 April 1984
- Sponsored by: Marilyn Quayle
- Acquired: 3 June 1985
- Commissioned: 6 July 1985
- Decommissioned: 29 June 2005
- Stricken: 29 June 2005
- Identification: Call sign: NVIN; Hull number: CG-49
- Motto: Freedom's Fortress
- Fate: Scrapped, 2011
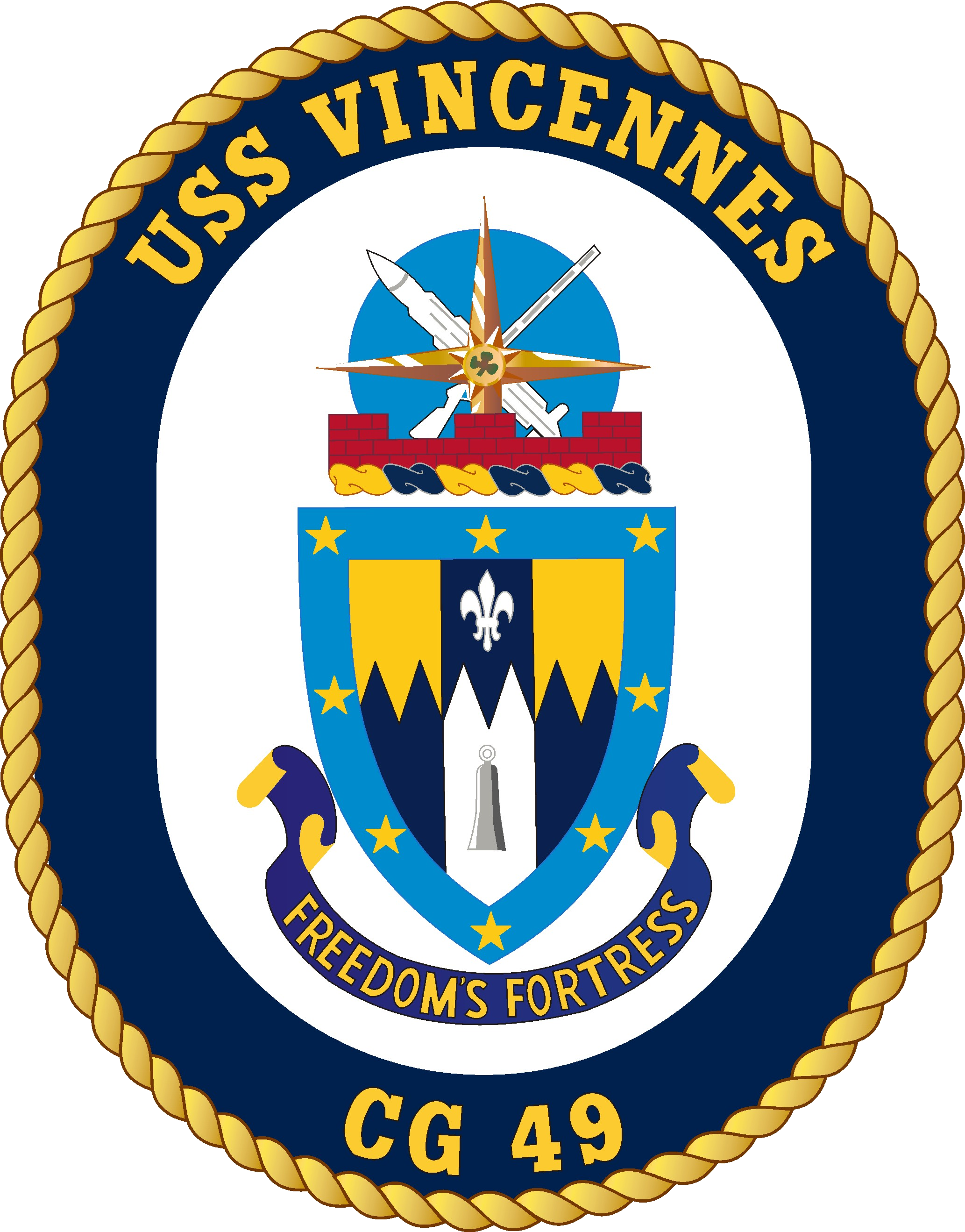
- Badge

General characteristics
- Class & type: Ticonderoga-class cruiser
- Displacement: Approx. 9,600 long tons (9,800 t) full load
- Length: 567 feet (173 m)
- Beam: 55 feet (16.8 meters)
- Draft: 34 feet (10.2 meters)
- Propulsion: 4 × General Electric LM2500 gas turbine engines; 2 × controllable-reversible pitch propellers; 2 × rudders
- Speed: 32.5 knots (60 km/h; 37.4 mph)
- Complement: 30 officers and 300 enlisted
- Sensors & processing systems: AN/SPY-1A/B multi-function radar; AN/SPS-49 air search radar (Removed on some ships); AN/SPG-62 fire control radar; AN/SPS-73 surface search radar; AN/SPQ-9 gun fire control radar; AN/SQQ-89(V)1/3 - A(V)15 Sonar suite, consisting of: AN/SQS-53B/C/D active sonar; AN/SQR-19 TACTAS, AN/SQR-19B ITASS, & MFTA passive sonar; AN/SQQ-28 light airborne multi-purpose system
- Armament: 2 × Mk 26 missile launchers; 68 × RIM-66 SM-2; 20 × RUR-5 ASROC; 8 × RGM-84 Harpoon missiles; 2 × 5 in (127 mm)/54 caliber Mark 45 lightweight gun; 2–4 × .50 in (12.7 mm) cal. machine gun; 2 × Phalanx CIWS; 2 × Mk 32 12.75 in (324 mm) triple torpedo tubes
- Aircraft carried: 2 × MH-60R Seahawk LAMPS Mk III helicopters.

USS Vincennes (CG-49) was a Ticonderoga-class guided missile cruiser outfitted with the Aegis combat system that was in service with the United States Navy from July 1985 to June 2005. She was one of 27 ships of the Ticonderoga class constructed for the United States Navy and one of five equipped with the Mark 26 Guided Missile Launching System.

Vincennes was commissioned in 1985. She saw service in the Pacific before being dispatched to the Persian Gulf in 1988 in support of Operation Earnest Will during the Iran–Iraq War, which was led by Saddam Hussein and backed by the U.S. On 3 July 1988, during the Iran–Iraq War, Vincennes shot down Iran Air Flight 655, a civilian passenger plane with 290 people on board, all of whom were killed. The incident followed a catalog of errors.

Vincennes was decommissioned in 2005 after attempts to retrofit the cruiser with the Mark 41 Vertical Launching System (VLS) failed. She was initially laid up in a reserve fleet at the Naval Inactive Ship Maintenance Facility at Naval Base Kitsap in Bremerton, Washington. In 2010 the vessel was towed to Texas for scrapping, which was completed in 2011.

== History ==
=== 1980s ===
Vincennes was launched on 14 April 1984 and sponsored by Marilyn Quayle, wife of Indiana Senator Dan Quayle. Vincennes was named for the Battle of Vincennes during the American Revolutionary War; the previous Vincennes heavy cruiser and Vincennes light cruiser were named for the city of Vincennes, Indiana. The cruiser was commissioned at Pascagoula on 6 July 1985, with Captain George N. Gee in command. The ship normally carried guided missiles, rapid-fire cannons, and two Seahawk LAMPS helicopters for anti-submarine and anti-ship warfare, personnel transfers, and other purposes.

Vincennes was the first of the Ticonderoga-class cruisers to enter the Pacific Fleet. Upon commissioning in 1985, Vincennes helped test the SM-2 Block II surface-to-air missile. In May 1986, Vincennes participated in the multinational exercise RIMPAC 86, coordinating the anti-aircraft warfare efforts of two aircraft carriers and more than 40 ships from five nations. Vincennes was deployed in August 1986 to the Western Pacific and Indian Oceans. The ship served as anti-air warfare commander with the Carl Vinson and New Jersey battle groups, operated with the Japan Maritime Self-Defense Force and the Royal Australian Navy, and steamed more than 46,000 nautical miles (85,000 km; 53,000 mi) in waters from the Bering Sea to the Indian Ocean.

=== Iran–Iraq War ===
During the Iran–Iraq War, the United States took active measures in the Persian Gulf to protect shipping, mainly oil tankers, that were being threatened by both countries.

=== Operation Earnest Will ===
On 14 April 1988, the guided missile frigate Samuel B. Roberts hit a mine in the Persian Gulf during Operation Earnest Will. Six days later, Vincennes was redeployed from Fleet Exercise 88–2, sent back to San Diego, California, and told to prepare for a six-month deployment. The reason for the haste: Navy leaders decided that an Aegis ship was needed to protect the exit of the damaged Samuel B. Roberts through the Strait of Hormuz. One month later, the cruiser entered the Persian Gulf, and in early July, stood guard in the Strait as the damaged frigate was borne out on the heavy-lift ship Mighty Servant 2. The ship made 14 Hormuz transits during its Earnest Will operations.

=== Iran Air Flight 655 ===
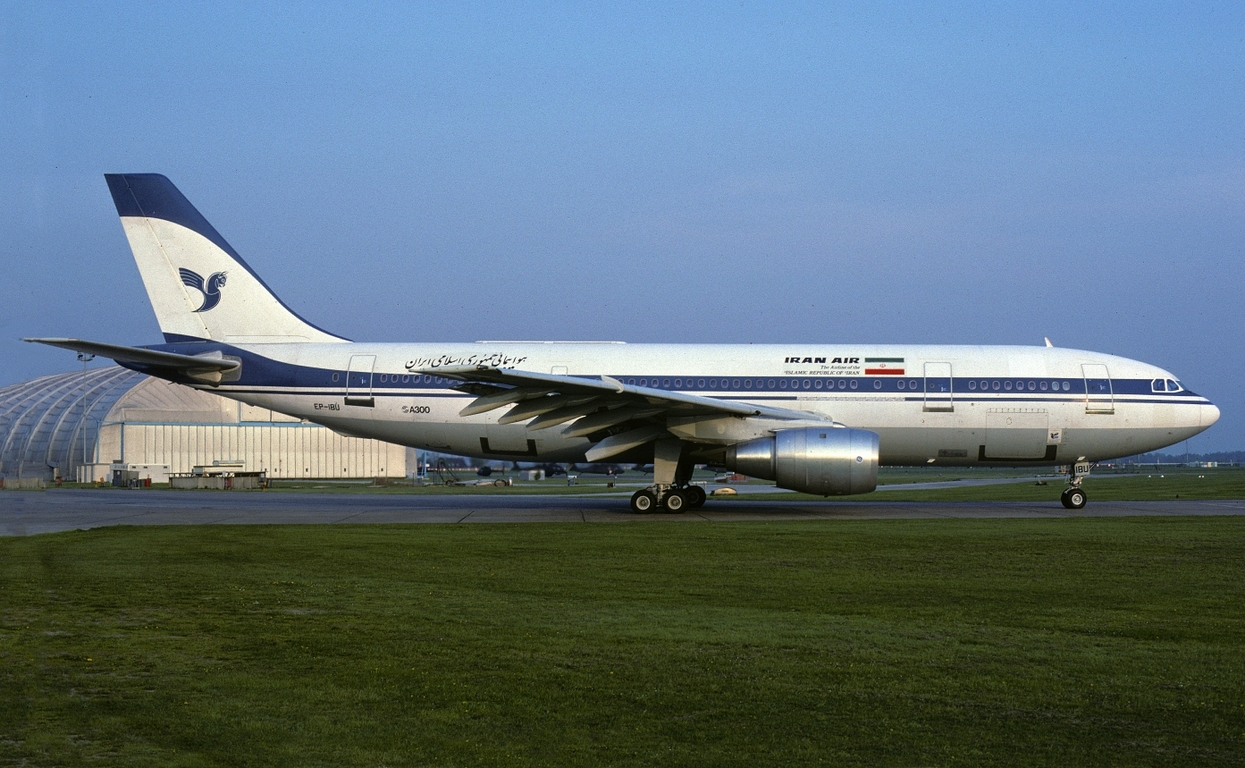
EP-IBU, the aircraft destroyed by Vincennes as Iran Air Flight 655

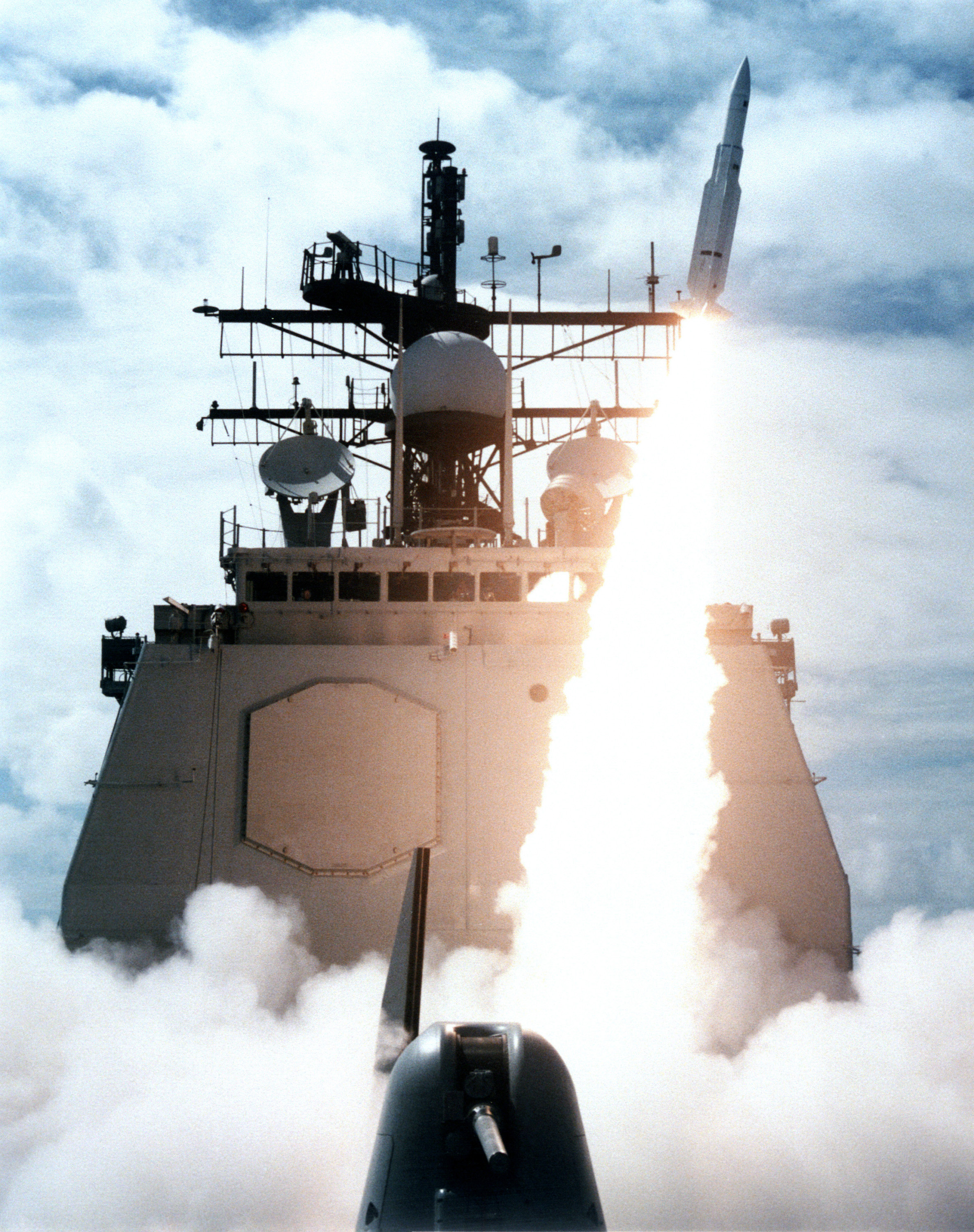
Vincennes (pictured 1987) launching SM-2MR surface-to-air missile

On 3 July 1988, Vincennes, under the command of Captain Will Rogers III, was on patrol when it was reported that Iranian Revolutionary Guard gunboats had attacked a Pakistani merchant vessel. Vincennes deployed one of her helicopters to investigate. Shortly thereafter, Rogers ordered his ship to move off station 50 miles (80 km) to the north. The destroyer flotilla commander ordered Vincennes to return to her original station. Vincennes's helicopter had followed the Revolutionary Guard gunboats into Iranian waters, and while maintaining contact with the boats, came under gunfire from the Iranians.

The helicopter crew reported that they had come under fire. With that report, Rogers turned his ship around and, with the frigate Elmer Montgomery, moved to intercept the gunboats. In doing so, Vincennes crossed into Iranian waters herself. As the U.S. ships approached, the Iranian gunboats maneuvered in what Rogers claimed was a threatening fashion. Rogers requested permission to fire. Command, not knowing that Vincennes had crossed into Iranian waters, granted permission. Vincennes and Elmer Montgomery commenced fire upon the gunboats at 9:43 a.m., scoring several hits on the gunboats, sinking two and damaging another.

While Vincennes was firing on the Iranian gunboats, confusion reigned aboard the ship—the tracking of aircraft in the area had become muddled between Vincennes and other U.S. ships. Crucially, Vincennes misidentified an Iran Air Airbus A300 civilian airliner, Iran Air Flight 655 (IR655), as an attacking F-14 Tomcat fighter aircraft. IR655 was climbing at the time, and her IFF transponder was on the Mode III civilian code rather than on the purely military Mode II, as recorded by Vincennes's own shipboard Aegis Combat System.

After issuing multiple radio challenges and receiving no response from the aircraft, Vincennes's crew commenced the process to engage it. The naval officer responsible for authorizing a missile launch, the watch's Anti-Air Warfare Coordinator (AAWC), pushed wrong buttons at least five times in response to a system message to select a weapon. In the meantime, the officer in charge of firing missiles, the watch's Missile System Supervisor (MSS), pushed "REQUEST RADIATION ASSIGN" at least 22 times, all without effect due to the AAWC not completing the appropriate process at his console. The AAWC finally selected the correct input at his console, allowing the MSS to again push "REQUEST RADIATION ASSIGN" and continue the process.

At 10:24 a.m, Vincennes fired two SM-2MR surface-to-air missiles, shooting down the Iranian civilian airliner over Iranian airspace in the Strait of Hormuz. All 290 passengers and crew on board were killed. The victims included 66 children and a family of 16 who were on their way to a wedding in Dubai.

The Iranian government has maintained that Vincennes knowingly shot down the civilian aircraft. IR655 flew every day out of Bandar Abbas—a civil and military airport—on a scheduled passenger flight to Dubai using established air lanes. The Italian navy and another U.S. warship, the frigate Sides, confirmed that the plane was climbing—not diving to attack—at the time of the missile strike. The U.S. radio warnings were only broadcast on "guard" (121.5 MHz) and not air traffic control frequencies. The Vincennes crew also misidentified the altitude and position of the plane; the Airbus crew, if monitoring guard, could have interpreted the warnings as intended for another aircraft. Captain David Carlson of Sides later said that the airliner's destruction "marked the horrifying climax to Rogers' aggressiveness".

=== 1990s ===
In February 1990, Vincennes was deployed on a third six-month tour of the western Pacific and Indian oceans with SH-60 helicopters from HSL-45 Detachment 13. The ship coordinated all battle group air events and served as the command-and-control flagship during Harpoon-Ex-90. In July 1990, Vincennes returned home after steaming nearly 100,000 nautical miles (190,000 km; 120,000 mi).

In August 1991, Vincennes departed for a fourth western Pacific deployment. Steaming with the aircraft carrier Independence, Vincennes performed duties as the anti-air warfare commander for Battle Group Delta until detaching to participate as the United States representative in MERCUBEX 91, a joint United States and Republic of Singapore Navy exercise. Over the next three months, Vincennes participated in the bilateral exercise Valiant Blitz with the South Korean Navy, the bilateral exercise Annualex 03G with the Japanese Maritime Self Defense Force, and ASWEX 92-1K with the South Korean Navy before reaching Hong Kong to act as the U.S. representative for the Navy Days ceremonies. Vincennes returned from deployment on 21 December 1991.

In June 1994, Vincennes departed on a fifth western Pacific deployment with the Kitty Hawk Battle Group. Vincennes performed duties as anti-air warfare commander for the battle group. During deployment, Vincennes conducted the anti-submarine exercise PASSEX 94–2 with the Japan Maritime Self-Defense Force; the bilateral exercise MERCUB 94–2, a joint U.S. and Singaporean Navy exercise of the Malaysian peninsula; the bilateral exercise Keen Edge with the Japan Maritime Self-Defense Force; and Tandem Thrust, a larger-scale joint exercise which Vincennes participated as the area air defense coordinator for the entire joint operating area. Vincennes returned from this deployment on 22 December 1994.

In August 1997, Vincennes changed homeport from San Diego to Yokosuka, Japan with SH-60B helicopters from HSL-49 Detachment 8G embarked. She then steamed to the South Pacific and took part in Exercise Valiant Usher 98–1 with the Belleau Wood amphibious ready group and the Royal Australian Navy destroyer HMAS Perth. The combined exercise took place near Townsend Island, Australia.

Vincennes also took part in the U.S. Seventh Fleet's Fleet Battle Experiment Delta (FBE-D) from 24 October 1998 to 2 November 1998, in conjunction with the exercise Foal Eagle, a regularly scheduled exercise that simulates the military defense of South Korea. Sponsored by the Navy Warfare Development Command, FBE-D was the fourth in a series of experiments that tested new combat systems and procedures at sea.

=== 2000s ===
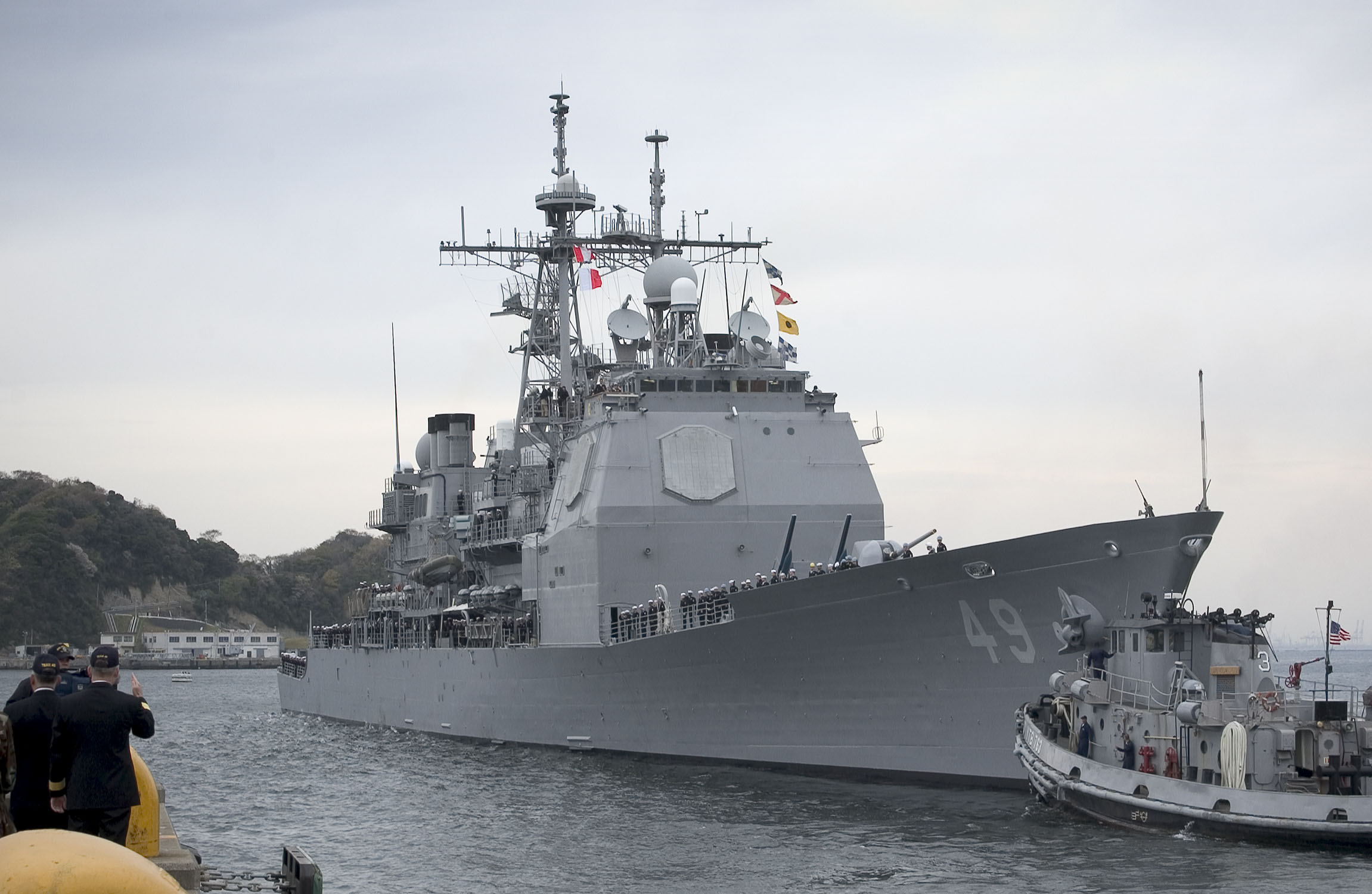
Vincennes departs Yokosuka for the last time en route to San Diego for decommissioning

On 12 August 2000, Vincennes completed Sharem 134, a bilateral exercise with several Japanese ships and other U.S. participants. The exercise included a week of undersea warfare training and data collection in the South China Sea. The ship tested her submarine detection, sonar range testing, and use of sonobuoys, and she developed new submarine prosecution procedures. The final Sharem events included a "free play", which allowed the cruiser to detect and prosecute other submarines, combining many of the tactics and systems tested during Sharem.

In mid-November 2000, the cruiser fired missile batteries at remote-controlled aerial drones provided by Fleet Activities Okinawa during MISSILEX 01–1.

Vincennes took part in a 23 August 2001 to 27 August 2001 military training exercise called Multi-Sail, which was designed to provide U.S. and Japanese forces interoperability training in multiple warfare areas.

Vincennes departed from Yokosuka on 17 September 2001 to conduct operations in support of Operation Enduring Freedom. The ship returned on 18 December 2001 after more than three months at sea.

In March 2003, Vincennes was assigned to Destroyer Squadron 15.

== Decommissioning ==
While there had been several proposals through the 1990s to retrofit the Mark 41 VLS into Vincennes and her four sister ships to extend their service life, none were funded, and all five ships were instead decommissioned; Vincennes herself was decommissioned and later stricken on 29 June 2005 at San Diego, California. She was mothballed at the Naval Inactive Ship Maintenance Facility in Naval Base Kitsap, in Bremerton, Washington. In 2008, Vincennes was slated for scrapping within the next five years along with her sister ships Thomas S. Gates and Yorktown.

On 9 July 2010, a contract to scrap Vincennes was issued to International Shipbreaking, Brownsville, Texas. On 21 November 2010, Vincennes arrived via the Panama Canal to International Shipbreaking in Brownsville, Texas, and she was completely scrapped by 23 November 2011.

== Awards and decorations ==
Vincennes has been awarded the Combat Action Ribbon (3 July 1988),

- Navy Meritorious Unit Commendation (16 January – 2 February 1987)
- Battle Efficiency "E" three times (1990, 1993, 2001)
- National Defense Service Medal
- Vincennes also received a Meritorious Unit Commendation, along with the entire Kitty Hawk battle group, for 9 July 1994 – 9 December 1994.
- Vincennes also received two Armed Forces Expeditionary Medals for Persian Gulf service, 22 May 1988 – 21 August 1988 and 5 May 1990 – 1 June 1990.

== Sources ==
- Crist, David (2012). The Twilight War: The Secret History of America's Thirty-Year Conflict with Iran. New York: Penguin Books. ISBN 978-0-14-312367-5.
- Fisk, Robert (2005). The Great War For Civilisation. Harper Perennial. ISBN 978-1-84115-008-6.
