= The Defense & Foreign Affairs Handbook on Azerbaijan =

- Author: Gregory R. Copley
- Language: English
- Subject: International Relations, US foreign policy
- Publisher: Defense & Foreign Affairs Handbook Group (International Strategic Studies Association)
- Publication date: 2006 (hardcover)
- Publication place: United States
- Pages: 191
- ISBN: 1-892998-12-2

The Defense & Foreign Affairs Handbook on Azerbaijan is a comprehensive guide to Azerbaijan and its strategic partnership with the West detailing key aspects of the country's history, infrastructure, government, defense and security structures, foreign policy apparatus, economy and social structures as well as the big economic growth through 2005–2007 and its impact on the nation's defense and national security structures. This foreign policy analysis book has been published in mid-2006 by the Defense & Foreign Affairs Handbook of International Strategic Studies Association.
