= USS Sides =

Oliver Hazard Perry-class frigate

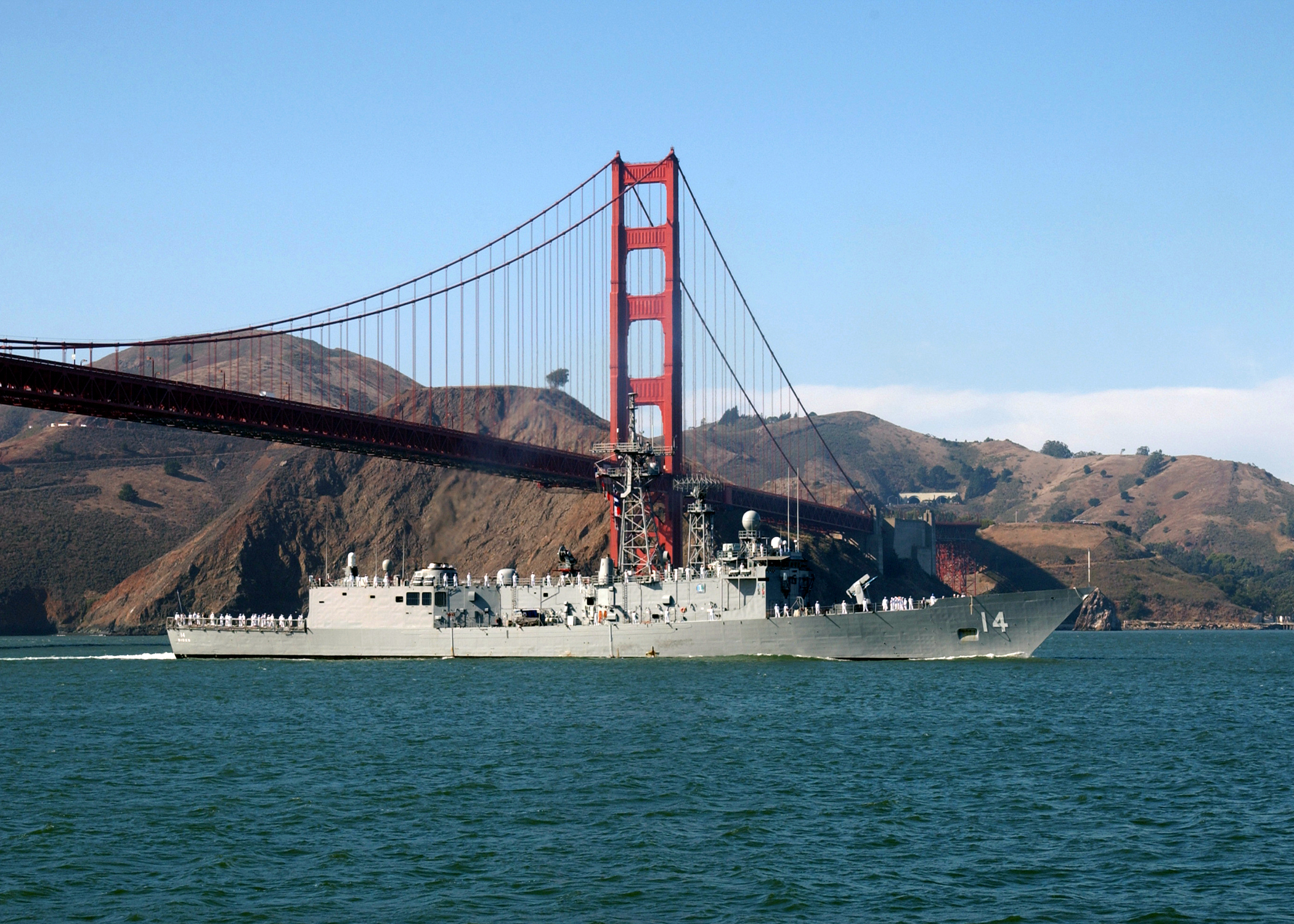
- USS Sides entering San Francisco Bay in 2002

History

United States
- Name: Sides
- Namesake: Admiral John H. Sides
- Ordered: 27 February 1976
- Builder: Todd Pacific Shipyards, Los Angeles Division, San Pedro, California
- Laid down: 7 August 1978
- Launched: 19 May 1979
- Sponsored by: Mrs. Joanne Sides Watson, daughter of Adm. Sides
- Commissioned: 30 May 1981
- Decommissioned: 28 February 2003
- Stricken: 24 May 2004
- Home port: NS San Diego, California (former)
- Identification: Hull symbol:FFG-14; Code letters:NJHS
- Motto: "Savvy"
- Fate: Sold for scrapping 15 December 2014
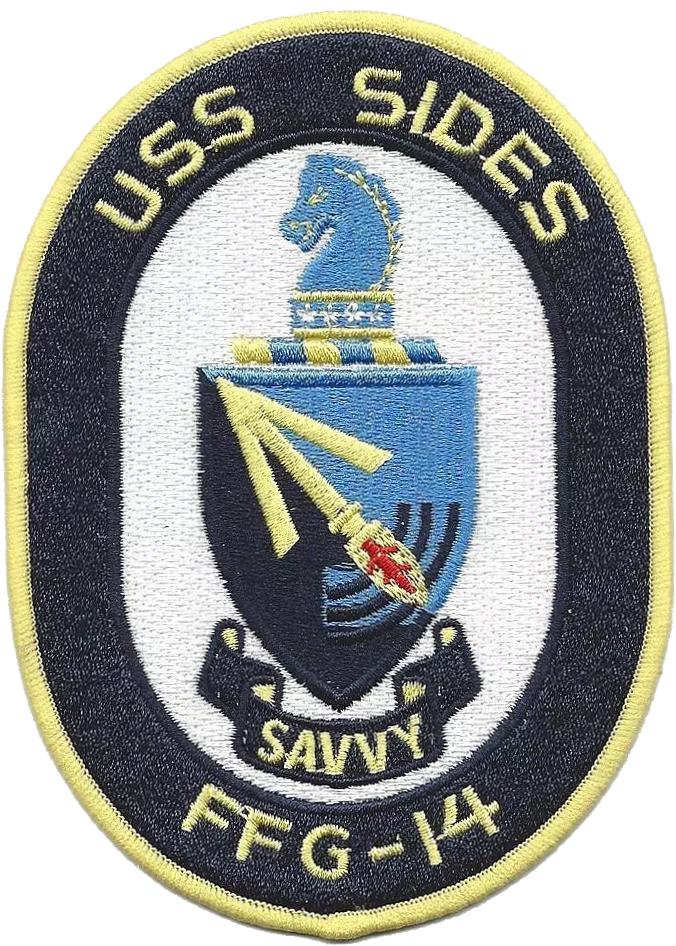
- Badge

General characteristics
- Class & type: Oliver Hazard Perry-class frigate
- Displacement: 4,100 long tons (4,200 t), full load
- Length: 445 feet (136 m), overall
- Beam: 45 feet (14 m)
- Draught: 22 feet (6.7 m)
- Propulsion: 2 × General Electric LM2500-30 gas turbines generating 41,000 shp (31 MW) through a single shaft and variable pitch propeller; 2 × Auxiliary Propulsion Units, 350 hp (260 kW) retractable electric azimuth thrusters for maneuvering and docking.
- Speed: over 29 knots (54 km/h)
- Range: 5,000 nautical miles at 18 knots (9,300 km at 33 km/h)
- Complement: 15 officers and 190 enlisted, plus SH-60 LAMPS detachment of roughly six officer pilots and 15 enlisted maintainers
- Sensors & processing systems: AN/SPS-49 air-search radar; AN/SPS-55 surface-search radar; CAS and STIR fire-control radar; AN/SQS-56 sonar.
- Electronic warfare & decoys: AN/SLQ-32
- Armament: As built: 1 × OTO Melara Mk 75 76 mm/62 caliber naval gun; 2 × Mk 32 triple-tube (324 mm) launchers for Mark 46 torpedoes; 1 × Vulcan Phalanx CIWS; 4 × .50-cal (12.7 mm) machine guns.; 1 × Mk 13 Mod 4 single-arm launcher for Harpoon anti-ship missiles and SM-1MR Standard anti-ship/air missiles (40 round magazine); Note: As of 2004, Mk 13 systems removed from all active US vessels of this class.
- Aircraft carried: 1 × SH-2F LAMPS I

USS Sides (FFG-14) was an Oliver Hazard Perry-class guided-missile frigate that served in the US Navy.

== History ==
The eighth ship in the class, it was named for Admiral John H. Sides (died 1978). Ordered from Todd Pacific Shipyards, Los Angeles Division, San Pedro, California, on 27 February 1976 as part of the FY76 program, Sides was laid down on 7 August 1978, launched on 19 May 1979, and commissioned on 30 May 1981. Sides ship sponsor was Mrs. Joanne Sides Watson, daughter of Admiral Sides.

Sides escorted tankers through the Straits of Hormuz during the Tanker War and participated in Operation Praying Mantis, the retaliation for Iranian mining operations. Sides was also part of the Surface Action Group under USS Vincennes when Iran Air 655 was shot down. Sides and her crew received a Meritorious Unit Commendation for the time period 13 April 1988 to 25 July 1988. The following year, Commander David R. Carlson authored an article in U.S. Naval Institute Proceedings in which Carlson called into question Vincennes' self-defense justification for the use of force and wrote, "Iran Air Flight 655 was shot down for no good reason." Capt. Will Rogers of Vincennes and David L. Dillon, speaking on behalf of the US Navy, challenged Carlson's account of events.

Sides and her crew received Navy E Ribbons for the 18-month period, July 1983 to December 1984, and for the years 1995, 1999 and 2000.

Sides was decommissioned on 28 February 2003 and as of 2014 was laid up in reserve at Naval Inactive Ships Maintenance Facility Bremerton, Washington.

Sides was expected to join the Portuguese Navy in 2006, together with her sister ship George Philip, but the Portuguese Navy dropped the offer and chose two Dutch Karel Doorman-class frigates instead. Sides was expected to join the Turkish Navy in the summer of 2008, together with her sister ship George Philip, but the Turkish Navy dropped the offer.
