= International Strategic Studies Association =

Non-governmental organization

The International Strategic Studies Association (ISSA) describes itself as Washington, D.C.–based non-governmental organization (NGO) with a worldwide membership of professionals involved in national management, particularly in national and international security and strategic policy. The International Strategic Studies Association was formed in 1982 to create a focus for regular discussion on strategic issues, including defense, defense industrial concerns, international technology transfer, geopolitical and psychological strategy developments.

== See also ==
- Strategic studies
