= United States Naval Forces Central Command =

Service component command of the United States Navy

United States Naval Forces Central Command (USNAVCENT)
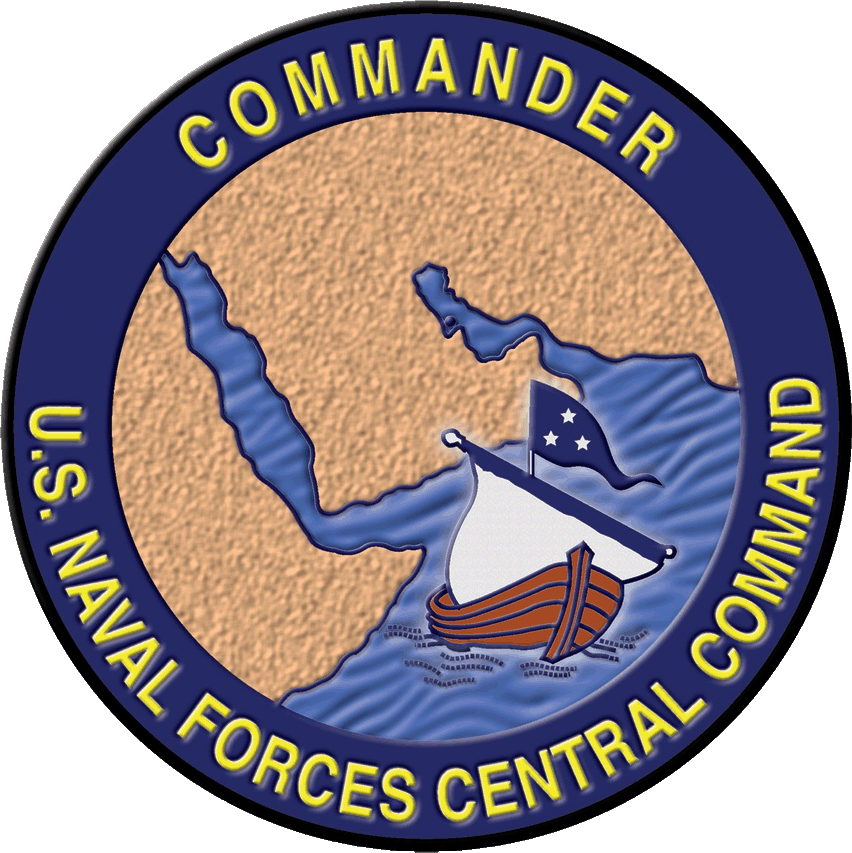
- Active: 1983–present
- Country: United States
- Branch: United States Navy
- Type: Service component command
- Part of: United States Central Command
- Headquarters: Naval Support Activity Bahrain
- Website: www.cusnc.navy.mil

Commanders
- Commander: VADM Curt A. Renshaw
- Deputy Commander: RDML Matthew J. Kawas
- Vice Commander: RDML Jeffrey A. Jurgemeyer
- United Kingdom Maritime Component Commander: Commodore Phillip Dennis
- Command Master Chief: Vacant

United States Naval Forces Central Command (NAVCENT) is the United States Navy element of United States Central Command (USCENTCOM). Its area of responsibility includes the Red Sea, Gulf of Oman, Persian Gulf, and Arabian Sea. It consists of the United States Fifth Fleet and several other subordinate task forces, including Combined Task Force 150, Combined Task Force 158 and others.

== Navy Persian Gulf operations 1945–1971 ==
The Navy's post-World War II operations in the Persian Gulf began in 1948 when a series of U.S. task groups, led by the aircraft carrier USS Valley Forge, the escort carrier USS Rendova, and Task Force 128 led by USS Pocono, visited the Persian Gulf. On 20 January 1948, Commander-in-Chief, Northeastern Atlantic and Mediterranean, Admiral Conolly, created Task Force 126 to supervise the large number of Navy fleet oilers and chartered tankers picking up oil in the Persian Gulf. By June 1949, the Task Force had become Persian Gulf Forces and on 16 August 1949 Persian Gulf Forces became Middle East Force.

In October 1948, Hydrographic Survey Group 1 arrived to help map the Persian Gulf's waters. Consisting of USS Maury, USS Dutton, USS John Blish, and USS Littlehales, the group remained in the Persian Gulf until April 1949, but their efforts were limited by weather, logistics support and upkeep.

In June 1952, Commander, Middle East Force, was Commander Task Force 109.

In 1971, when Bahrain achieved full independence, the U.S. Navy leased part of the former British base HMS Jufair, originally established in 1935. It was renamed it Administrative Support Unit, Bahrain. The name was changed to Naval Support Activity Bahrain in 1999, to reflect its broader support role.

== Naval Forces Central Command from 1983 ==
The command was established on 1 January 1983 along with the rest of U.S. Central Command, and command of NAVCENT was initially given to a flag officer selectee based at Pearl Harbor and tasked with coordinating administrative and logistical support for U.S. naval forces in the Persian Gulf. Rear Admiral (lower half) Stan Arthur, the first ComUSNAVCENT, served simultaneously as the Commander-in-Chief, Pacific Fleet, Plans Officer during his first year in the position. An actual flag officer deployed to the region known as Commander, Middle East Force (COMMIDEASTFOR), retained operational control of U.S. naval forces in the Persian Gulf and effectively served as USCENTCOM's de facto naval component commander.

Following the initial establishment of U.S. Central Command, the boundary between USCENTCOM and U.S. Pacific Command (USPACOM) was the Strait of Hormuz.

USS Klakring (FFG-42) passed southbound through the Suez Canal on 25 and 26 June 1985. As the ship crossed the Red Sea, she began to observe the weekends on Thursdays and Fridays to assimilate crewmen to Muslim daily routines. Klakring fueled and provisioned at Djibouti, Horn of Africa, on 30 June. On 1 July, she rendezvoused with guided missile destroyer Charles F. Adams and exchanged information and equipment. Whalig became Commander Task Unit (CTU) 109.1.2, and oversaw the scheduling of all multi-ship training in the Persian Gulf. Klakring sailed through the Strait of Hormuz, and on 7 July rendezvoused with command ship La Salle near Abu Dhabi, United Arab Emirates (UAE). The frigate escorted the flagship to Sitra in Bahrain.

To direct forces of multiple services operating over the boundary, Joint Task Force Middle East was established on 20 September 1987. It was soon obvious that JTF-ME and the Middle East Force were directing much the same operations, and a single dual-hatted naval commander, Commander, Middle Eastern Force (COMMIDEASTFOR), was appointed by February 1988. U.S. Naval Forces Central Command took part in Operation Earnest Will in 1986–1987 and supported Army special operations helicopters conducting Operation Prime Chance. Operation Praying Mantis followed later.

== Iraqi invasion of Kuwait ==
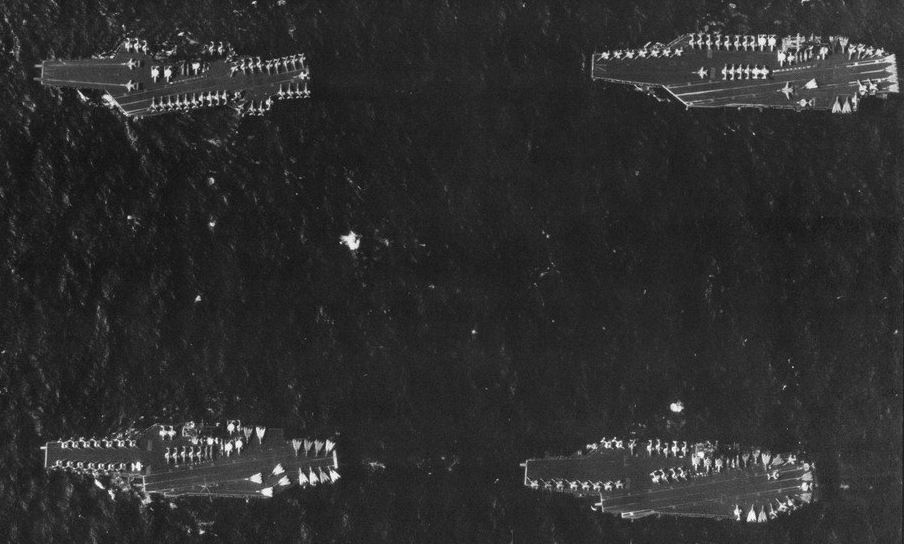
Battle Force Zulu - 1991 Gulf War

In August 1990, Captain Robert Sutton USN, who had been selected for promotion to rear admiral (lower half), was serving as ComUSNAVCENT. The first Central Command operations order for Desert Shield, issued on 10 August 1990, reflected the Pearl Harbor/MIDEASTFOR split and split the tasks between the two organisations, but, 'most likely,' Pokrant writes, 'Schwarzkopf had already decided to do things differently.' As Pokrant recounts, in a meeting on 6 August 1990, the Central Command plans chief, Rear Admiral Grant Sharp, had advised Schwarzkopf to have a [numbered] fleet commander assigned to CENTCOM to control the extensive naval forces that would deploy. Schwarzkopf discussed the issue with Commander-in-Chief, Pacific Command, Admiral Huntington Hardisty. It was agreed that the Commander, U.S. Seventh Fleet (COMSEVENTHFLT) staff, under Vice Admiral Henry H. Mauz, Jr. ("Hank" Mauz), would be despatched to command in the Middle East and, tentatively, the Commander, U.S. Third Fleet staff would be earmarked to replace them in six months.

Mauz, his staff, and his flagship, USS Blue Ridge, were all located at Yokosuka, Japan, their normal homeport. To speed the process of taking over command, Mauz obtained permission from Hardisty to fly immediately to Diego Garcia aboard a VIP-configured Lockheed P-3 Orion, 'Peter Rabbit,' with key members of his staff. The rest of the command group would steam to the Persian Gulf aboard Blue Ridge. When Mauz was cleared to proceed from Diego Garcia to Bahrain, he expected to land and have some days to familiarise himself with the situation before taking over command of NAVCENT from Rear Admiral William M. Fogarty. However, on landing he found a message from Schwarzkopf ordering him to assume command immediately.

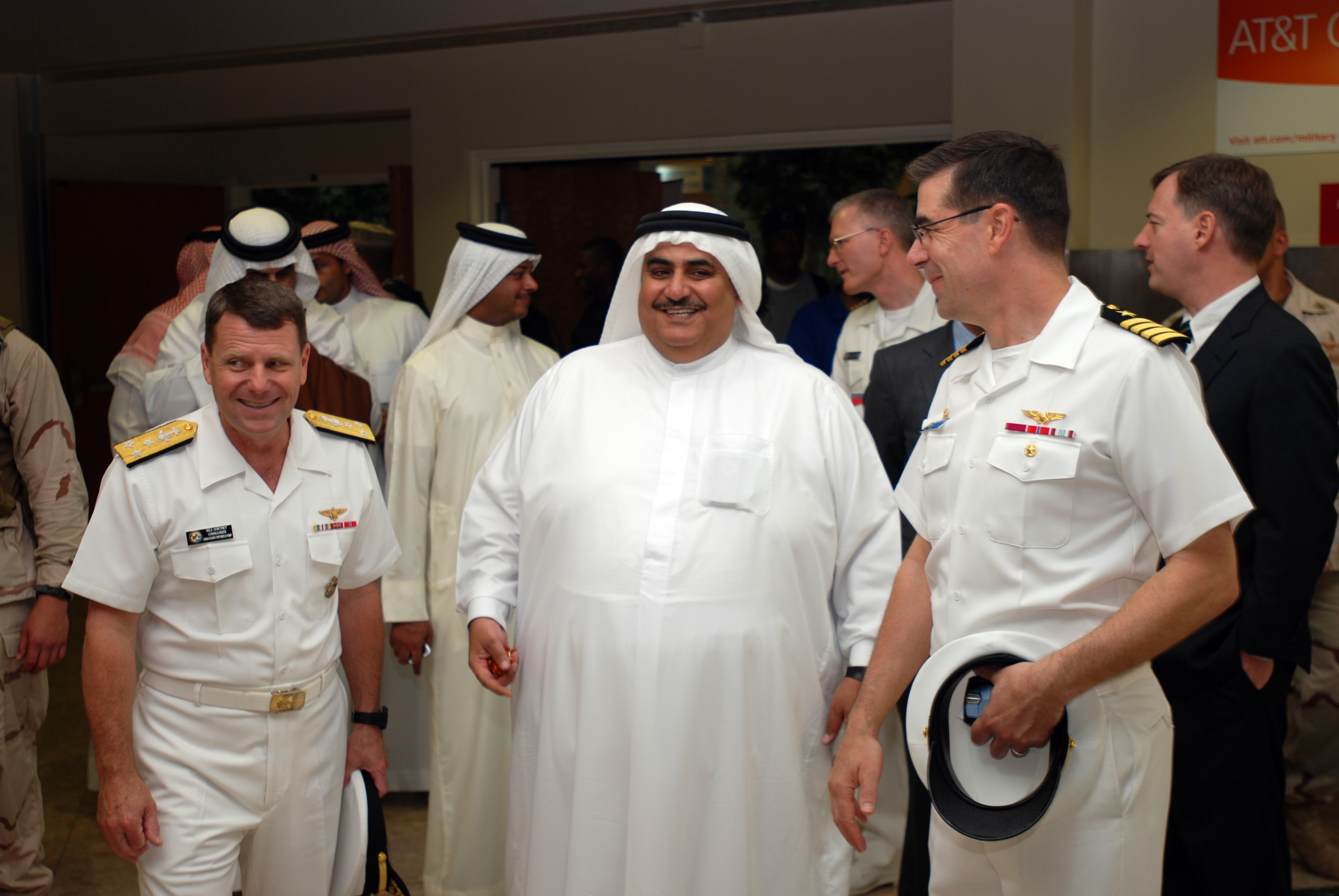
Vice Adm. Bill Gortney welcomes Bahraini Foreign Minister Khalid bin Ahmed Al Khalifa to NAVCENT headquarters in Manama, 28 August 2008

After arriving in-theatre in late 1990, Vice Admiral Mauz "retained the Middle East Force, designated CTG 150.1 [Commander Task Group 150.1], for most warfighting functions inside the Persian Gulf. Under this hat, Rear Admiral Fogarty would control only the half-dozen ships or so of the Middle East Force, augmented by the battleship Wisconsin when it arrived. Under a second hat, CTG 150.2, Fogarty would be the commander of the U.S. Maritime Interception Force. For this job, his authority would extend outside the Persian Gulf to ships operating in the North Arabian Sea and Red Sea, but only for interception operations." The CVBGs in the North Arabian Sea and Red Sea were designated Task Groups 150.4 and 150.5 respectively; the Amphibious and Landing Forces were CTG 150.6 and CTG 150.8 (Major General Jenkins). Rear Admiral Stephen S. Clarey was Commander U.S. Maritime Prepositioning Force, Commander Task Group 150.7 (CTG 150.7), with the equipment for the U.S. Marine Corps aboard. After the ships had disembarked the Marine equipment in Saudi Arabia, CTG 150.7 was disestablished on 12 September 1990.

From 1 January 1991, the six carriers deployed were divided into Battle Force Yankee (two carriers, including Saratoga, in the Red Sea under Rear Admiral Riley Mixson, Commander, Carrier Group Two/Task Force 155) and Task Force 154, Battle Force Zulu (four carriers in the Arabian Sea/Persian Gulf under Rear Admiral Daniel P. March, Commander, Carrier Group Five). TF 150 was Vice Admiral Henry H. Mauz, Jr. himself, TF 151 the Middle East Force, now including USS Bunker Hill, TG 150.3 Naval Logistics Support Force (Rear Admiral Bob Sutton), and TF 156 the amphibious force.

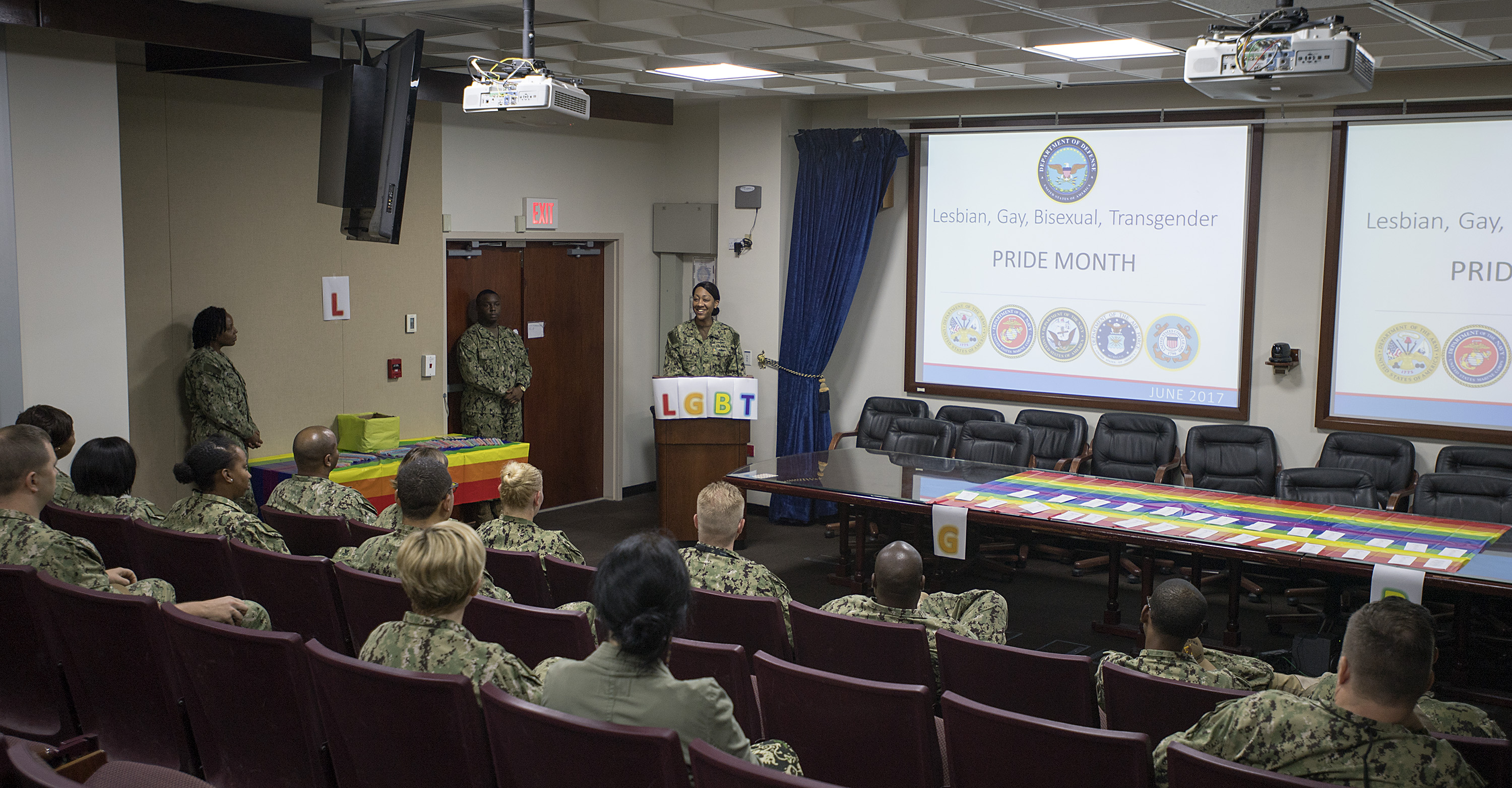
U.S. Naval Forces Central Command hosts an LGBT Pride Month observance on 29 June 2017

Since ComUSNAVCENT operated from on board ship, he established NAVCENT-Riyadh as a staff organization to provide continuous Navy representation at CENTCOM headquarters. This mission was assigned initially to Commander, Carrier Group Three (COMCARGRU 3). During succeeding months, the NAVCENT-Riyadh staff was augmented substantially but remained small, relative to the ARCENT and CENTAF staffs. In November, the NAVCENT-Riyadh command was transferred from COMCARGRU 3 to Commander, Cruiser-Destroyer Group 5. This change resulted in the Navy flag officer at NAVCENT Riyadh's remaining relatively junior to other Service representatives, particularly CENTAF. This imbalance in size and seniority between the Navy and other staffs, coupled with the geographic separation with NAVCENT headquarters, made it difficult for NAVCENT-Riyadh to represent the interests of the Navy in the overall coordination and planning efforts.

On 24 April 1991, Vice Admiral Stan Arthur turned over command of NAVCENT to Rear Admiral Ray Taylor, Fogerty's replacement as Commander, Middle East Force, and Arthur and Blue Ridge began their voyage back to the Pacific. Two months earlier, Rear Admiral Taylor had submitted thoughts on the reorientation of the NAVCENT command structure to Schwarzkopf following an earlier direction from Admiral Arthur. The proposal, which was modified in the staffing process, eventually meant that the one-staff ComUSNAVCENT in Hawaii was upgraded to a two-star appointment co-located with Central Command headquarters in Tampa, Florida. Rear Admiral David Rogers became the first two-star Navy representative in Tampa when he relieved Rear Admiral Sutton.

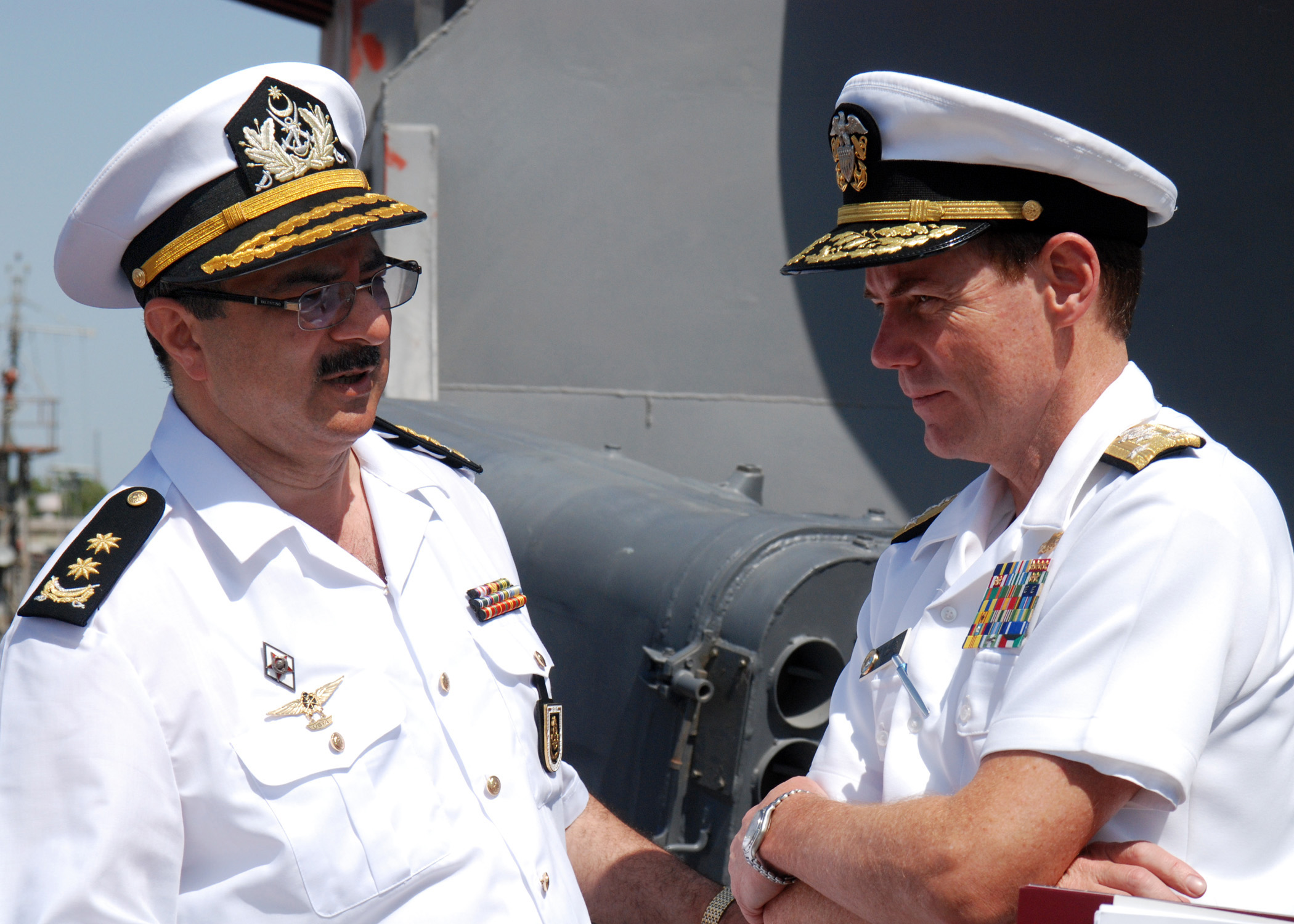
Vice Admiral Kevin Cosgriff, commander, U.S. Naval Forces Central Command, meets with Vice Admiral, Azerbaijani Navy, Shahin Sultanov during his visit to Baku, Azerbaijan in June 2008.

Although COMSEVENTHFLT held command responsibility during this period, no numbered fleet existed permanently within the USCENTCOM area of responsibility during the first Gulf War and for the next four years thereafter. By July 1995, a new numbered fleet was deemed necessary by the senior U.S. Navy leadership, and after a 48-year hiatus, the U.S. Fifth Fleet was reactivated, replacing COMMIDEASTFOR. Dual-hatted as COMUSNAVCENT as the naval component command of USCENTCOM, the same Vice Admiral (and his staff) as Commander, U.S. Fifth Fleet (COMFIFTHFLT) now directs naval operations in the Persian Gulf, Red Sea, and the Arabian Sea. The combined COMUSNAVCENT/COMFIFTHFLT headquarters is located at NSA Bahrain in Manama, Bahrain. The command oversees both afloat and shore-based units that rotationally deploy or surge from the United States, plus a few smaller surface ships that are based in the Gulf for longer periods. Ships rotationally deploy to the U.S. Fifth Fleet from the Pacific and Atlantic Fleets.

From 2010 through 2013, the U.S. maintained two aircraft carriers east of Suez, known as a "2.0 carrier presence," although it sometimes temporarily dipped below that level. The heightened presence aimed to provide air and sea striking power for U.S. operations in Iraq and Afghanistan and also to deter Iran from bad behavior in the region and keep the Strait of Hormuz open.

In 2016 the USS San Antonio, USS Mason, USS Nitze, and USS Ponce came under attack as they moved through the Bab al-Mandeb strait on the southern end of the Red Sea. Shortly after the attacks, the USS Nitze destroyed three radar sites in Yemen in retaliation for the two separate attacks on U.S. ships in the Red Sea.

On 1 December 2018, NAVCENT commander Vice Admiral Scott A. Stearney was found dead in his residence in Bahrain. No foul play was suspected. Rear Admiral Paul J. Schlise assumed interim command. Vice Admiral Jim Malloy flew to Bahrain to take command.

== Task Forces ==
See United States Fifth Fleet#Composition for more historical detail and context

Task Force Structure of U.S. Naval Forces Central Command (June 2025)
| Task Force | Role | Elements | Current Units (If available) |
|---|---|---|---|
| Task Force 50 | Carrier Strike Group | Nimitz-class Aircraft Carrier Ticonderoga-class Cruiser Arleigh Burke-Class Destroyer | Carrier Strike Group 1: USS Carl Vinson; Carrier Air Wing 2; Cruiser USS Princeton (CG-59); Destroyer Squadron 1; USS Sterett (DDG-104); USS William P. Lawrence (DDG-110); Arriving in June 2025: Carrier Strike Group 11: USS Nimitz; Carrier Air Wing 17; Destroyer Squadron 9; USS Curtis Wilbur (DDG-54); USS Gridley (DDG-101); USS Wayne E. Meyer (DDG-108); USS Lenah Sutcliffe Higbee (DDG-123) |
| Task Force 51 | Naval Amphibious Force/Marine Expeditionary Brigade | Wasp-class LHD Tarawa-class LHA Harpers Ferry-class LSD Whidbey Island-class LSD AV-8B Harrier II CH-53D/E Sea Stallion V-22A Osprey AH-1W Super Cobra | US Navy Task Force 51 ARG 5th Marine Expeditionary Brigade |
| Task Force 53 | Logistics | Fast Combat Support Ship Dry Cargo/Ammunition Ship Fleet Replenishment Oiler | Unknown |
| Task Force 54 | Submarine Forces | Ohio-Class Guided-Missile Submarine Los Angeles-Class Submarine | Unknown |
| Task Force 55 | Non-CSG/Independent Surface Forces | Ticonderoga-class Cruiser Arleigh Burke-Class Destroyer Freedom-class LCS Avenger-Class MCM MH-53E Sea Dragon | At least 5 deployed destroyers in the region: USS Paul Ignatius (DDG-117); USS Oscar Austin (DDG-79); USS Arleigh Burke (DDG-51); USS Thomas Hudner (DDG-116); USS The Sullivans (DDG-68) |
| Task Force 56 | Expeditionary Combat Forces: Explosive Ordnance Disposal, Naval Coastal Warfare, SeaBees, Expeditionary Logistics Support Forces, and Riverine Forces | Marine Mammals Inshore Boat Units Mobile Construction Battalion Riverine Forces Individual Augmentee | Unknown |
| Task Force 57 | Maritime Patrol Forces: Maritime surveillance and reconnaissance operations | P-8A Poseidon, MMA Aircraft MQ-4C Triton, ISR UAV | Unknown |
| Task Force 59 | Unmanned Systems & AI | Unmanned Aerial Vehicles Unmanned Surface Vehicles Unmanned Underwater Vehicles | Unknown |

== Combined Maritime Forces ==
In February 2002 the Combined Maritime Forces was established within USNAVCENT headquarters as an embedded activity. It is an international naval partnership that provides security for civilian maritime traffic by conducting counter-piracy and counter-terrorism missions in the heavily trafficked waters of the Middle East, Africa and South Asia, including the Red Sea, the Persian Gulf, the Gulf of Aden, Arabian Sea and the wider Indian Ocean.

As of May 2025, there were 46 sovereign state participants. Most states joined and then continued to participate in a variety of ways. The United Arab Emirates became a member of the task force, but has not participated since March 2023.

USNAVCENT has organised the CMF into four principal task forces:

- Combined Task Force 150 (CTF-150) – Maritime Security & Counter-terrorism
- Combined Task Force 151 (CTF-151) – Counter-piracy
- Combined Task Force 152 (CTF-152) – Persian Gulf Security Cooperation
- Combined Task Force 153 (CTF-153) – Red Sea Maritime Security
- Combined Task Force 154 (CTF-154) – Maritime Security Training

After the September 11 terrorist attacks on the United States, Commander, Task Force 150, previously a single-nation U.S. formation, was made into a multinational effort as Combined Task Force 150 (HOA MIO Force), and was given a renewed focus on maritime security and counter-terrorism. It was established on 3 February 2002, by Vice Admiral Charles W. Moore, Commander, US Naval Forces Central Command. Over time, it became increasingly involved in combating the rising incidence of piracy in Somalia.

Combined Task Force 151 was established in January 2009 by Vice Admiral William E. Gortney specifically to address counter-piracy operations.

Operating alongside CTF 151 and Operation Ocean Shield are other national deployments such as the People's Liberation Army Navy, most recently with "CTF 526" aboard the Type 054 frigate Wenzhou (which had the hull number 526).

Combined Task Force 153 was established in April 2022 by Vice Admiral Brad Cooper with a mission of maritime security and capacity building efforts in the Red Sea, Bab al-Mandeb, and Gulf of Aden. Captain Robert Francis was designated the first CTF-153 commander.

The Combined Task Force 154 was established on 22 May 2023 as a training arm operating around the Middle East with a focus on five core principles — maritime domain awareness, law of the sea, maritime interdiction, maritime rescue and assistance, and leadership development. On 11 February 2026, Commodore Milind M Mokashi SC of the Indian Navy took command of CTF 154.

=== Combined Maritime Forces Participants ===
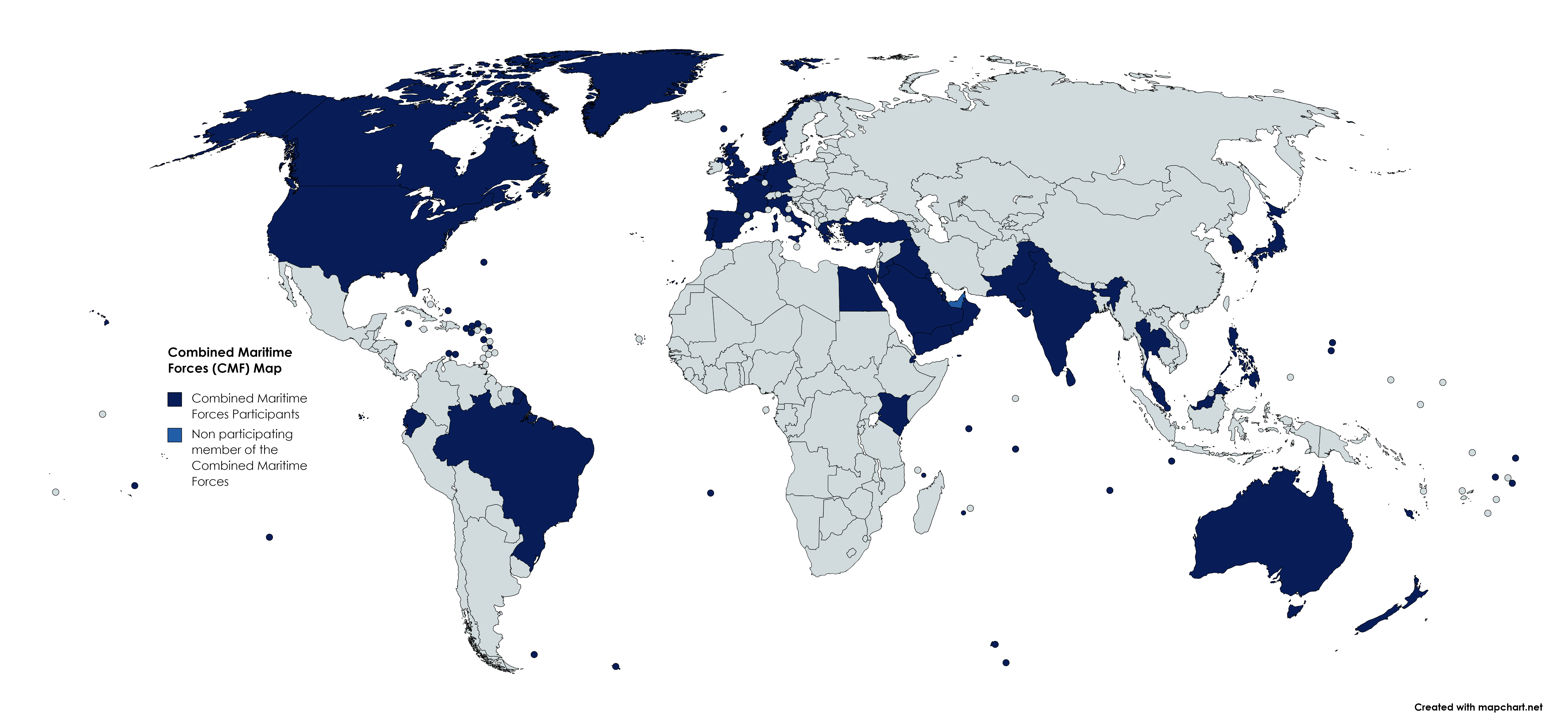
Combined Maritime Forces (CMF) Map

There are now 46 members of the CMF, including:

- Albania
- Argentina
- Australia
- Bahrain
- Belgium
- Brazil
- Canada
- Denmark
- Ecuador
- Djibouti
- Egypt
- Finland
- France
- Germany
- Greece
- India
- Iraq
- Italy
- Japan
- Jordan
- Kenya
- Kuwait
- Malaysia
- Netherlands
- New Zealand
- Norway
- Oman
- Pakistan
- Philippines
- Poland
- Portugal
- Qatar
- Saudi Arabia
- Seychelles
- Singapore
- South Korea
- Spain
- Sri Lanka
- Sweden
- Thailand
- Turkey
- United Arab Emirates (2002–2023)
- United Kingdom
- United States
- Yemen

== List of commanders ==
| No. | Commander | | Term | | | Notes |
| No. | Portrait | Name | Took office | Left office | Term length | Notes |
Commander, U.S. Naval Forces Central Command (COMUSNAVCENT)
| 1 | Stanley R. Arthur | Rear Admiral (lower half); Stanley R. Arthur (born 1935) | 1 January 1983 | 1987 | ~4 years, 0 days | Later served as the 5th NAVCENT commander from 1990 to 1991. |
| 2 | Philip F. Duffy | Rear Admiral (lower half); Philip F. Duffy | 1987 | June 1990 | ~3 years, 151 days | Commander, Training Command, U.S. Atlantic Fleet (1990-1991); Retired, 1991. |
| 3 | Robert Sutton | Captain; Robert Sutton (1942–2020) | June 1990 | August 1990 | ~61 days | Promoted to RDML in 1991; RADM in 1996; Commander, U.S. Naval Logistics; Support Force (Task Force 150.3) (1990-1991); Commander, U.S. Naval Forces Central Command (Rear) (1991); Retired, 1999. |
Commander, U.S. Naval Forces Central Command (COMUSNAVCENT) and U.S. Seventh Fleet (C7F)
| 4 | Henry H. Mauz Jr. | Vice Admiral; Henry H. Mauz Jr. (born 1936) | August 1990 | 1 December 1990 | ~122 days | Deputy Chief of Naval Operations for Navy Program Planning (1990-1992); Promoted to admiral, 1992. Commander-in-Chief, U.S. Atlantic Fleet (1992-1994); Retired, 1994. |
| 5 | Stanley R. Arthur | Vice Admiral; Stanley R. Arthur (born 1935) | 1 December 1990 | 24 April 1991 | 144 days | Continued to command Seventh Fleet until July 1992; Promoted to admiral, 1992. Vice Chief of Naval Operations (1992-1995); Retired, 1995. |
Commander, U.S. Naval Forces Central Command (COMUSNAVCENT)
| 6 | Raynor A.K. Taylor | Rear Admiral; Raynor A.K. Taylor (1935–2013) | 24 April 1991 | 19 October 1992 | 1 year, 178 days | Retired, 1993. |
| 7 | Douglas J. Katz | Vice Admiral; Douglas J. Katz | 19 October 1992 | September 1994 | ~1 year, 317 days | Commander, Naval Surface Force, U.S. Atlantic Fleet (1994-1997); Retired, 1997. |
| 8 | John Scott Redd | Vice Admiral; John Scott Redd (born 1944) | September 1994 | 1 July 1995 | ~303 days | Director for Strategy, Plans and Policy, Joint Staff (1996-1998); Retired, 1998. |
Commander, U.S. Naval Forces Central Command (COMUSNAVCENT) and U.S. Fifth Fleet (C5F)
| 8 | John Scott Redd | Vice Admiral; John Scott Redd (born 1944) | 1 July 1995 | June 1996 | ~336 days | Director for Strategy, Plans and Policy, Joint Staff (1996-1998); Retired, 1998. |
| 9 | Thomas B. Fargo | Vice Admiral; Thomas B. Fargo (born 1948) | June 1996 | 27 July 1998 | ~2 years, 56 days | Promoted to admiral, 1999. Commander-in-Chief, U.S. Pacific Fleet (1999-2002); Commander-in-Chief, U.S. Pacific Command (2002); Commander, U.S. Pacific Command (2002-2005); Retired, 2005. |
| 10 | Charles W. Moore Jr. | Vice Admiral; Charles W. Moore Jr. (born 1946) | 27 July 1998 | 3 February 2002 | 3 years, 191 days | Deputy Chief of Naval Operations for Fleet Readiness and Logistics (2002-2004); Retired, 2004. |
Commander, U.S. Naval Forces Central Command (COMUSNAVCENT), U.S. Fifth Fleet (C5F) and Combined Maritime Forces (CMF)
| 10 | Charles W. Moore Jr. | Vice Admiral; Charles W. Moore Jr. (born 1946) | 3 February 2002 | 11 February 2002 | 8 days | Deputy Chief of Naval Operations for Fleet Readiness and Logistics (2002-2004); Retired, 2004. |
| 11 | Timothy J. Keating | Vice Admiral; Timothy J. Keating (born 1948) | 11 February 2002 | 7 October 2003 | 1 year, 238 days | Director of the Joint Staff (2003-2004); Promoted to admiral, 2004. Commander, U.S. Northern Command and North American Aerospace Defense Command (2004-2007); Commander, U.S. Pacific Command (2007-2009); Retired, 2009. |
| 12 | David C. Nichols | Vice Admiral; David C. Nichols (born 1950) | 7 October 2003 | 3 November 2005 | 2 years, 27 days | Deputy Commander, U.S. Central Command (2005-2007); Retired, 2007. |
| 13 | Patrick M. Walsh | Vice Admiral; Patrick M. Walsh (born 1955) | 3 November 2005 | 27 February 2007 | 1 year, 116 days | Promoted to admiral, 2007. Vice Chief of Naval Operations (2007-2009); Commander, U.S. Pacific Fleet (2009-2012); Retired, 2012. |
| 14 | Kevin J. Cosgriff | Vice Admiral; Kevin J. Cosgriff | 27 February 2007 | 5 July 2008 | 1 year, 129 days | Retired, 2008. |
| 15 | William E. Gortney | Vice Admiral; William E. Gortney (born 1955) | 5 July 2008 | 5 July 2010 | 2 years, 0 days | Director of the Joint Staff (2010-2012); Promoted to admiral, 2012. Commander, U.S. Fleet Forces Command (2012-2014); Commander, U.S. Northern Command and North American Aerospace Defense Command (2014-2016); Retired, 2016. |
| 16 | Mark I. Fox | Vice Admiral; Mark I. Fox (born 1956) | 5 July 2010 | 24 May 2012 | 1 year, 324 days | Deputy Chief of Naval Operations for Operations, Plans, and Strategy (2012-2013); Deputy Commander, U.S. Central Command (2013-2016); Retired, 2016. |
| 17 | John W. Miller | Vice Admiral; John W. Miller | 24 May 2012 | 3 September 2015 | 3 years, 102 days | Retired, 2015. |
| 18 | Kevin M. Donegan | Vice Admiral; Kevin M. Donegan (born 1958) | 3 September 2015 | 19 September 2017 | 2 years, 16 days | Director of Navy Staff and Deputy Chief of Naval Operations for Operations, Plans and Strategy (2017-2018); Retired, 2018. |
| 19 | John C. Aquilino | Vice Admiral; John C. Aquilino (born 1962) | 19 September 2017 | 6 May 2018 | 229 days | Promoted to admiral, 2018. Commander, U.S. Pacific Fleet (2018–2021); Commander, U.S. Indo-Pacific Command (2021–2024); Retired, 2024. |
| 20 | Scott Stearney | Vice Admiral; Scott Stearney (1960–2018) | 6 May 2018 | 1 December 2018 | 209 days | Found dead in Bahrain residence, cause of death ruled a suicide. |
| - | Paul J. Schlise | Rear Admiral (lower half); Paul J. Schlise (born 1966); Acting | 1 December 2018 | 7 December 2018 | 6 days | Was deputy commander of NAVCENT/C5F from 2017 to 2019. Director, Surface Warfare Division, N96, Office of the Chief of Naval Operations (2020-present) |
| 21 | James J. Malloy | Vice Admiral; James J. Malloy (born 1963) | 7 December 2018 | 19 August 2020 | 1 year, 256 days | Deputy Commander, U.S. Central Command (2020-present) |
| 22 | Samuel Paparo | Vice Admiral; Samuel Paparo (born 1964) | 19 August 2020 | 5 May 2021 | 259 days | Promoted to admiral, 2021. Commander, U.S. Pacific Fleet (2021-present) |
| 23 | Charles B. Cooper II | Vice Admiral; Charles B. Cooper II (born 1967) | 5 May 2021 | 1 February 2024 | 2 years, 272 days | - |
| 25 | George M. Wikoff | Vice Admiral; George M. Wikoff (born 1968) | 1 February 2024 | 4 October 2025 | 1 year, 245 days | - |
| 24 | Curt A. Renshaw | Vice Admiral; Curt A. Renshaw (born 1968) | 4 October 2025 | Incumbent | 1 year, 3 days | - |
