= Brad Cooper (admiral) =

American admiral (born 1967)

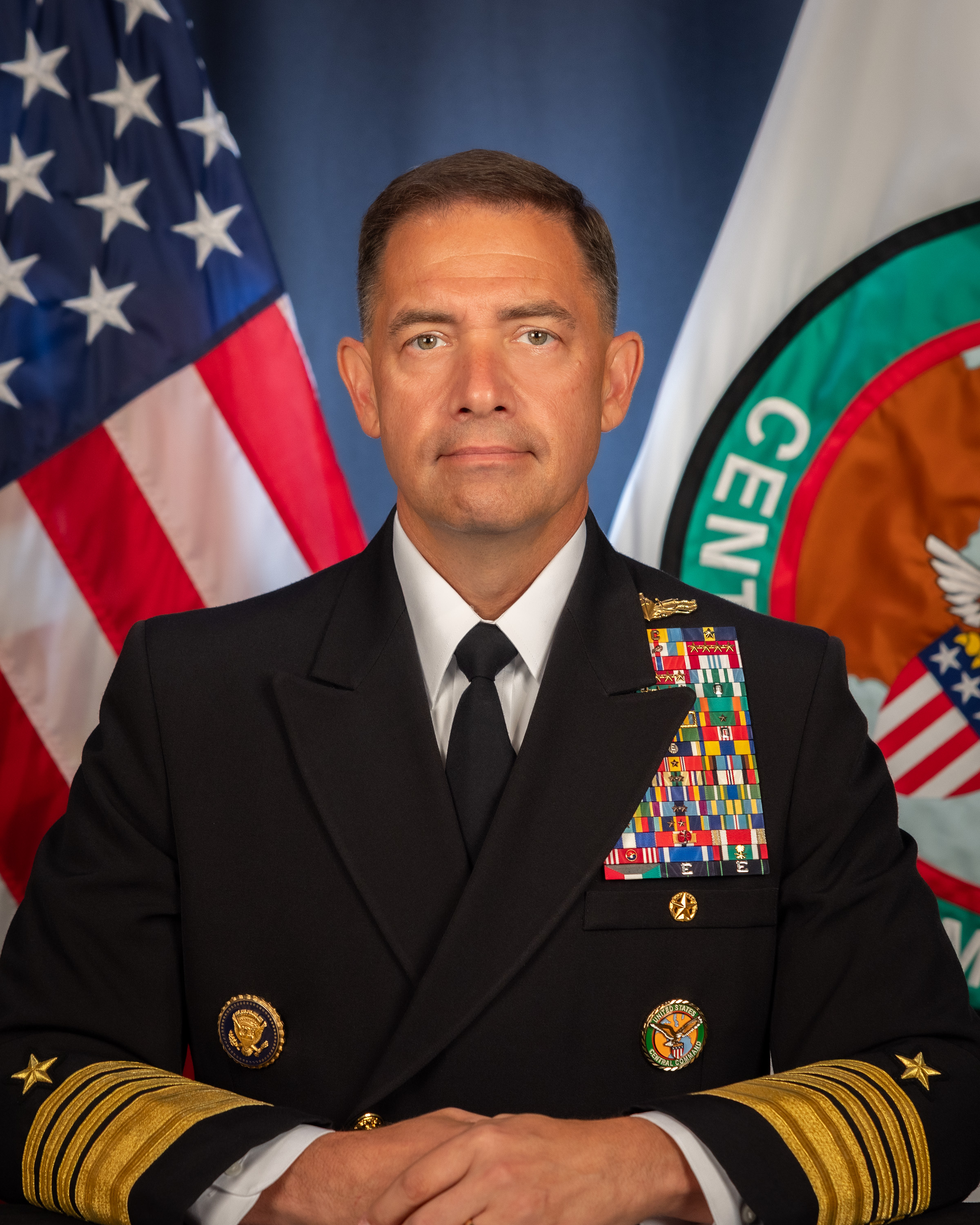
- Official portrait, 2025
- Born: Charles Bradford Cooper II; 1967 (age 58–59); Winston-Salem, North Carolina, U.S.
- Education: United States Naval Academy (BS); National Intelligence University (MS)
- Spouse: Susan Cooper
- Military career
- Allegiance: United States
- Branch: United States Navy
- Service years: 1989–present
- Rank: Admiral
- Commands: United States Central Command; United States Naval Forces Central Command; United States Fifth Fleet; Naval Surface Force Atlantic; Expeditionary Strike Group 7; United States Naval Forces Korea; USS Gettysburg (CG-64); USS Russell (DDG-59)
- Conflicts: Gulf War; Bosnian War; Operation Deny Flight; Kosovo War; War in Afghanistan; Red Sea crisis; Operation Prosperity Guardian; Operation Poseidon Archer; 2026 Iran war
- Awards: Navy Distinguished Service Medal; Defense Superior Service Medal (2); Legion of Merit (5); Bronze Star Medal

Charles Bradford Cooper II (born 1967) is an American admiral who has served as the commander of the United States Central Command since 2025 and has led forces during the 2026 Iran war.

Cooper was born in North Carolina and raised in Alabama. He graduated from the United States Naval Academy in 1989 and became a career surface warfare officer. His commands included a destroyer, a cruiser, U.S. Naval Forces Korea, and Expeditionary Strike Group 7. Cooper has been deployed during combat operations in the Gulf War and the lead-up to the Iraq War; the Yugoslav Wars; and the war in Afghanistan. In the latter, Cooper served in the Combined Security Transition Command, Afghanistan, while an advisor to the Afghan government. He also served in the White House, the Office of the Secretary of Defense, the U.S. Africa Command, and the U.S. Pacific Fleet. His senior posts included as Chief of Legislative Affairs of the United States Navy from 2019 to 2020 and as Commander, Naval Surface Force Atlantic, from 2020 to 2021.

He served as the commander of the U.S. Naval Forces Central Command, U.S. Fifth Fleet, and Combined Maritime Forces from 2021 to 2024. He became the deputy commander of Central Command in 2024. Cooper helped oversee the response to the attacks against U.S. forces in the region during the Gaza war, following the October 7 attacks in Israel. He also led forces in the naval and air operations during the Red Sea crisis, and expanded partnerships with regional navies, particularly to counter the Houthi attacks on commercial vessels. In June 2025, Secretary of Defense Pete Hegseth announced that Cooper was President Donald Trump's nominee for commander of the United States Central Command. When Cooper took over the role on 8 August 2025, he became the first Navy admiral to hold the post since William J. Fallon in 2008.

As the commander of Central Command, Cooper prepared for and commanded operations during the war against Iran that began on 28 February 2026, in coordination with the Israel Defense Forces. He said throughout the war that Iran's conventional military capabilities have been significantly degraded, while acknowledging that it still has the ability to threaten shipping in the Strait of Hormuz. Cooper also expanded cooperation with the Syrian transitional government in the war against the Islamic State, and included Syria and Lebanon in the Central Command's regional security dialogue for the first time.

== Early life and education ==
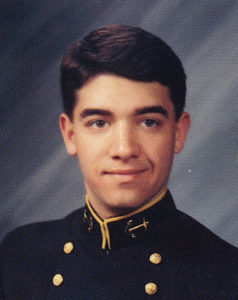
Midshipman portrait, 1989

Charles Bradford Cooper II was born in Winston-Salem, North Carolina, in 1967, and is the son of a United States Army officer. He grew up in a military family; his father and grandfather both served in the Army. He attended Sidney Lanier High School in Montgomery, Alabama, and is a 1989 graduate of the United States Naval Academy, where he obtained a bachelor of science degree in economics. Cooper later earned a master's degree in strategic intelligence from the National Intelligence University, and also studied national security policy and international relations at Harvard and Tufts universities. He is also a graduate of the United States Army Command and General Staff College.

== Early naval career ==
After receiving his commission at the Naval Academy in 1989, he became a career surface warfare officer in the United States Navy, serving on guided-missile cruisers, guided-missile destroyers, aircraft carriers, and amphibious assault ships. Cooper's assignments included as the Combat Information Center (CIC) officer on USS Thomas S. Gates (CG 51), operations officer of the USS Fitzgerald (DDG 62) and USS Anzio (CG 68), and executive officer of the USS Vicksburg (CG 69). He was also the flag aide to the commander of the USS Dwight D. Eisenhower Carrier Strike Group. His ship commands were the destroyer USS Russell (DDG 59) and the cruiser USS Gettysburg (CG 64). During his tenure as commanding officer of Gettysburg, the ship and its crew won the 2013 Battenberg Cup, recognizing it as the best vessel in the United States Fleet Forces Command, the Navy's Atlantic fleet. Cooper was awarded the Legion of Merit for his accomplishments as Gettysburg's captain.

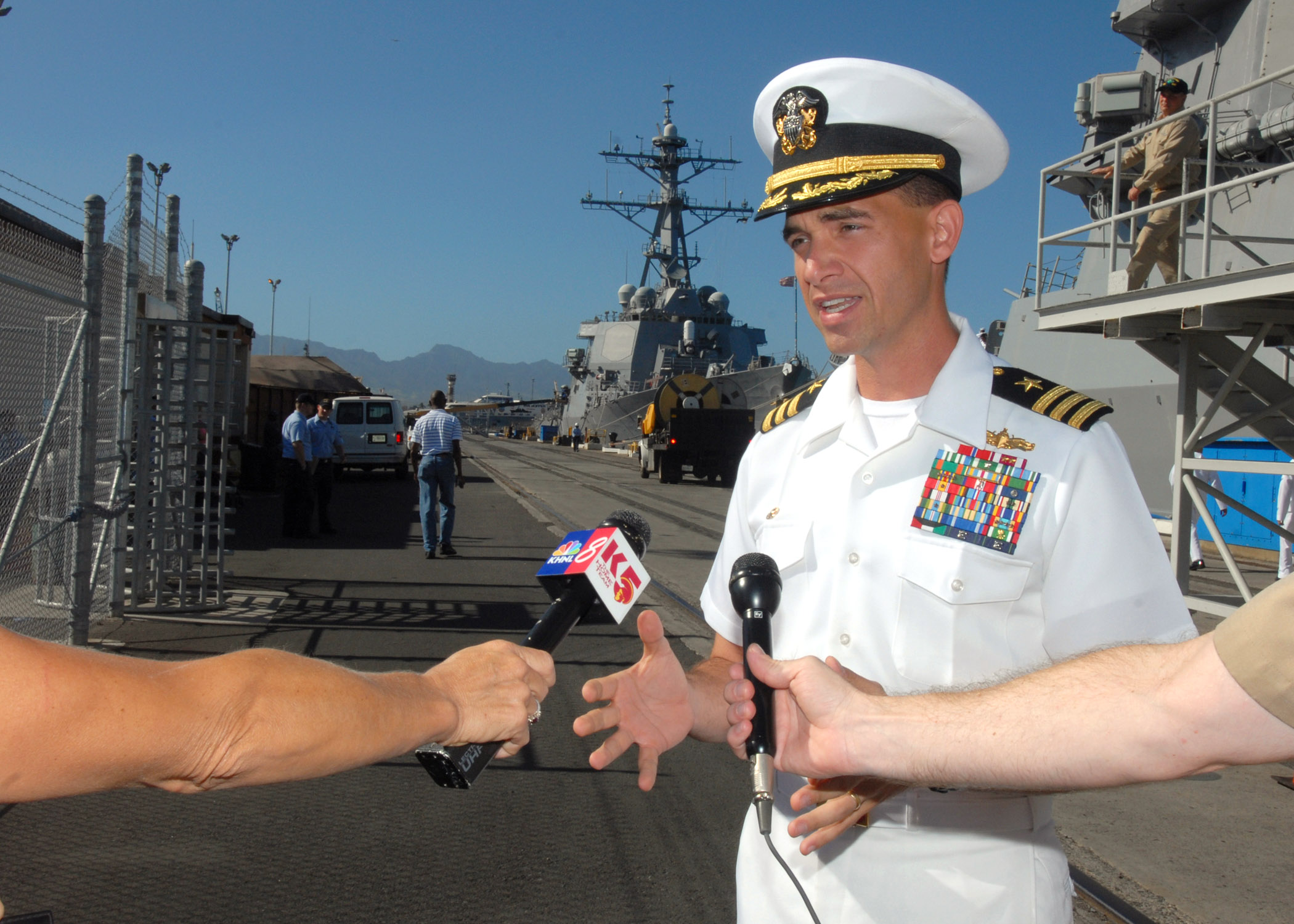
Cooper answering questions from local media as the commanding officer of USS Russell, 3 February 2007

Cooper took part in at least 13 named operations. His deployments included the Gulf War; three counter-narcotics operations off the coast of South America; Haitian migrant operations; the enforcement of the no-fly zone over Bosnia and Herzegovina and operations in the buildup to the Kosovo War; three maritime interdiction operations in the Persian Gulf against Saddam Hussein's Iraq; a deployment to the Arabian Sea after the 9/11 attacks; a deployment in the Western Pacific; and the war in Afghanistan. During the latter, Cooper was division chief for strategic reform of the Afghan Police and Border Guards while assigned to Combined Security Transition Command, Afghanistan. He also served as principal U.S. Advisor to the Interior Minister of the Islamic Republic of Afghanistan.

Ashore, he served in a variety of executive, military assistant, and special assistant roles in the White House, the Office of the Secretary of Defense, U.S. Africa Command, and U.S. Pacific Fleet headquarters. Cooper was the senior military assistant to the Under Secretary of Defense for Personnel and Readiness; special assistant to the commander of the U.S. Africa Command; and flag aide to the commander of the U.S. Pacific Fleet. While at the White House, as of 2011 he was the executive director of the "Joining Forces" campaign, which was launched by Second Lady Jill Biden and promoted by First Lady Michelle Obama to raise support in the private sector for assisting military families and veterans. He also served as both Deputy Director and Director, Surface Warfare Officer assignments, at Navy Personnel Command. Cooper was in the latter post when he was nominated for promotion to rear admiral in July 2016.

== Senior naval career ==
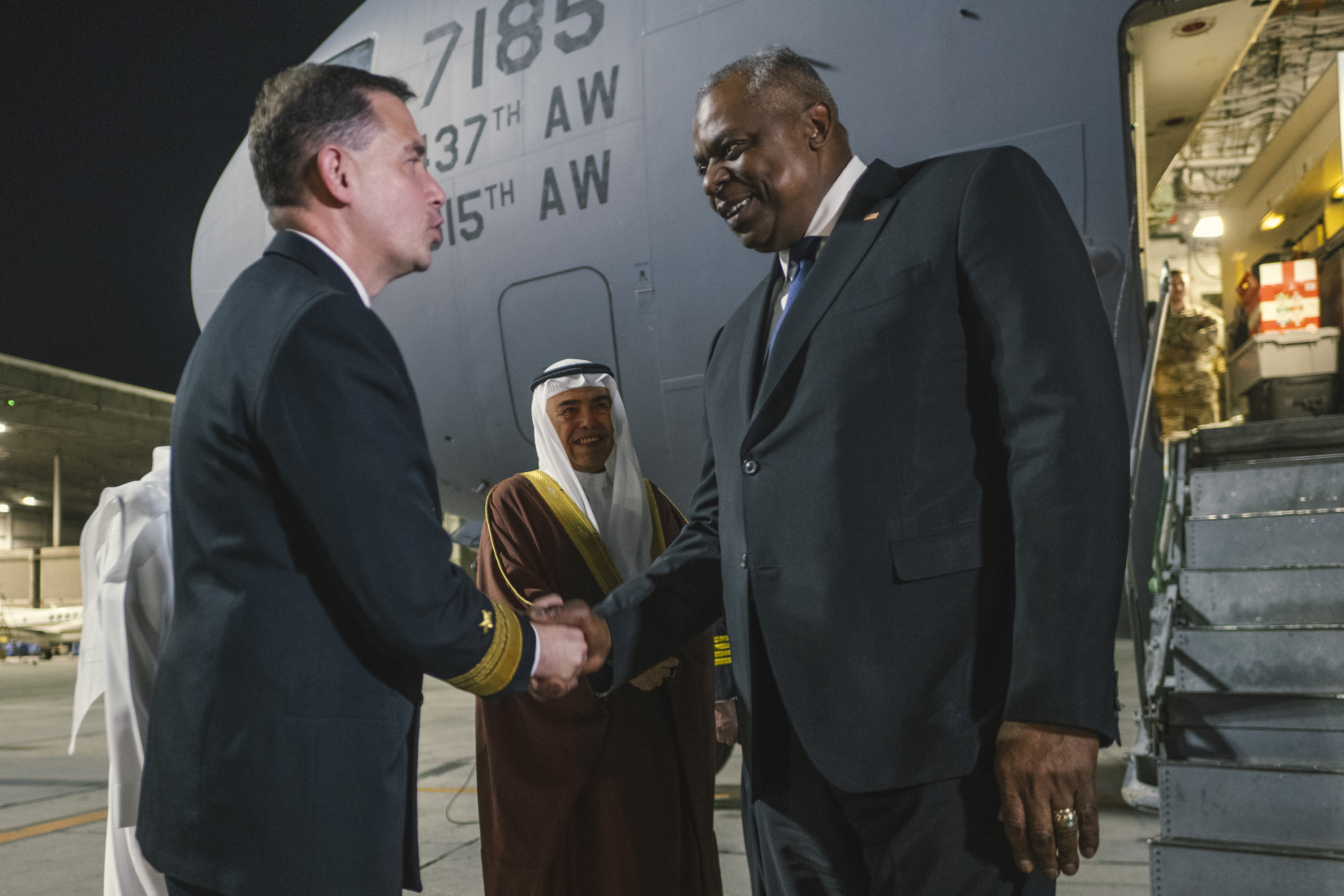
Cooper greeting Defense Secretary Lloyd Austin during the secretary's visit to U.S. forces in Bahrain, 17 December 2023

As a rear admiral, Cooper became commander of United States Naval Forces Korea in September 2016. During this tour, his sailors were honored with the Republic of Korea Presidential Unit Citation, the first such recognition of a Navy unit since the Korean War, and he was bestowed the Korean name Goo Tae-il (Note: In this Korean name, the family name is Goo.) (Note: Korean: 구태일; Hanja: 龜泰日) by the ROK-US Alliance Friendship Association in honor of his service to the Korean peninsula. He relinquished command in January 2018, and became commander of Expeditionary Strike Group 7 in Okinawa, Japan, where he led the U.S. military's first F-35 deployment. He also led the Navy response to typhoon damage in Guam and the Northern Mariana Islands, and the joint task force that supported the 2018 APEC summit. Cooper then served as the chief of legislative affairs, leading the Navy's engagement with the U.S. Congress to work on budget issues. Cooper's next assignment was as commander of Naval Surface Force Atlantic from June 2020, in which he launched new initiatives to expand mental healthcare access for sailors and improve fleet-wide readiness; and oversaw the response to the COVID-19 pandemic. Cooper relinquished command in March 2021.

In April 2021, he was nominated for promotion to vice admiral and the position in Bahrain of commander of U.S. Naval Forces Central Command; commander of U.S. Fifth Fleet; and commander of Combined Maritime Forces. Cooper took command on 5 May 2021. During the violent period following the October 7 attacks and the start of the Gaza war in 2023, Cooper worked closely with General Michael Kurilla, the head of United States Central Command, for the response to attacks on U.S. forces in Iraq, Syria, Jordan, and the Red Sea. Cooper also frequently visited Israel while serving as the Fifth Fleet commander, and became acquainted with every general and many colonels in the Israel Defense Forces. Cooper established "unprecedented" cooperation between the U.S. Fifth Fleet and the Israeli Navy, and expanded partnerships with other regional navies. He was in command when the U.S. Navy began Operation Prosperity Guardian in December 2023 to defend merchant ships from attacks by the Houthis in Yemen, and played a central role in the operation.

During that tour, he significantly expanded multi-national maritime partnerships, established the Navy's first unmanned and artificial intelligence Task Force, and led multiple operations countering Iranian and Houthi activity throughout the Middle East, including operations Prosperity Guardian and Poseidon Archer in the southern Red Sea. In April 2023, Cooper was nominated for reappointment as vice admiral and assignment as the deputy commander of United States Central Command. He assumed the post in February 2024. That same month, he told the media that the actions against the Houthis represent the largest and most intense operation of the U.S. Navy since World War II. Cooper organized the U.S. military's maritime corridor that briefly increased the delivery of humanitarian aid to Gaza in 2024, and that summer he visited the Strait of Mandeb to personally examine the Houthi attacks on shipping.

=== CENTCOM commander ===
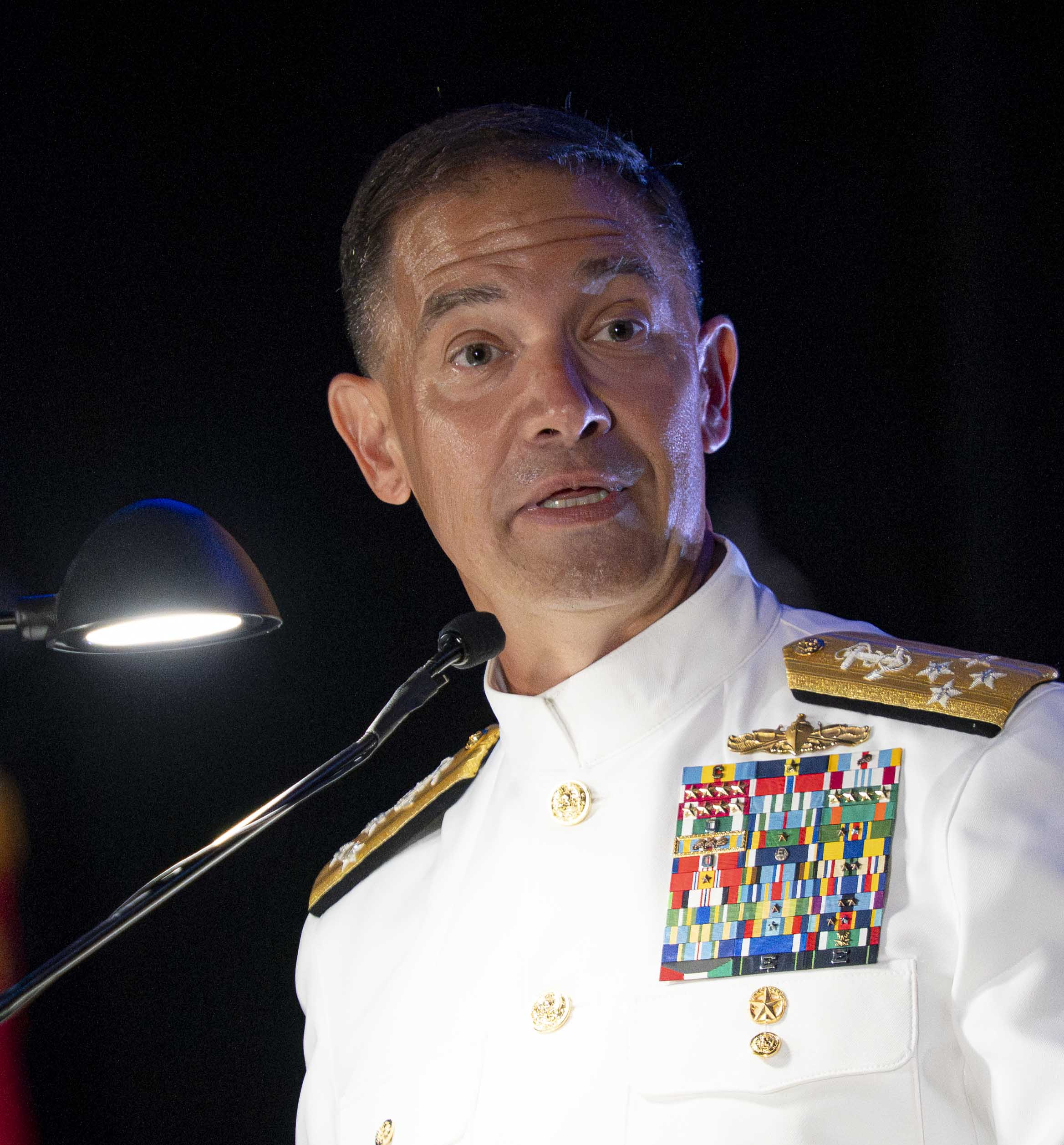
Cooper speaks at the CENTCOM change of command ceremony in Tampa, Florida, on 8 August 2025

In June 2025, Secretary of Defense Pete Hegseth announced that Cooper was President Donald Trump's nominee for commander of the U.S. Central Command, with the grade of admiral. Cooper was selected by the Trump administration over Army general James Mingus, who had been expected to receive the position, in what was interpreted as a prioritization of naval operations ahead of a potential confrontation with Iran and the ongoing mission against the Houthis. Cooper is a critic of Iran and a supporter of Israel, like his predecessor Michael Kurilla. Kurilla recommended him to Trump, who took that into consideration and chose Cooper over several other candidates. On 8 August 2025, he succeeded Kurilla as commander of Central Command, becoming the first naval officer to hold the post since William J. Fallon in 2008, as it was traditionally held by Army or Marine generals.

At his nomination hearing, Cooper said that the U.S. should maintain its military presence in Syria as part of the war against the Islamic State, and should work with the Syrian transitional government against ISIS. In September 2025, Cooper visited Damascus, where he met with Syrian President Ahmed al-Sharaa and U.S. special envoy Tom Barrack to discuss cooperation on counter-Islamic State operations and future U.S.–Syrian engagement. On 21 January 2026, Cooper spoke by phone with al-Sharaa regarding the ceasefire with the Syrian Democratic Forces (SDF) amid the northeastern Syria offensive and coordination on the transfer of Islamic State detainees from Syria to Iraq. The next day, Cooper met with SDF commander-in-chief Mazloum Abdi, along with Tom Barrack, in Erbil to discuss implementation, integration, and ongoing U.S. support for the ceasefire.

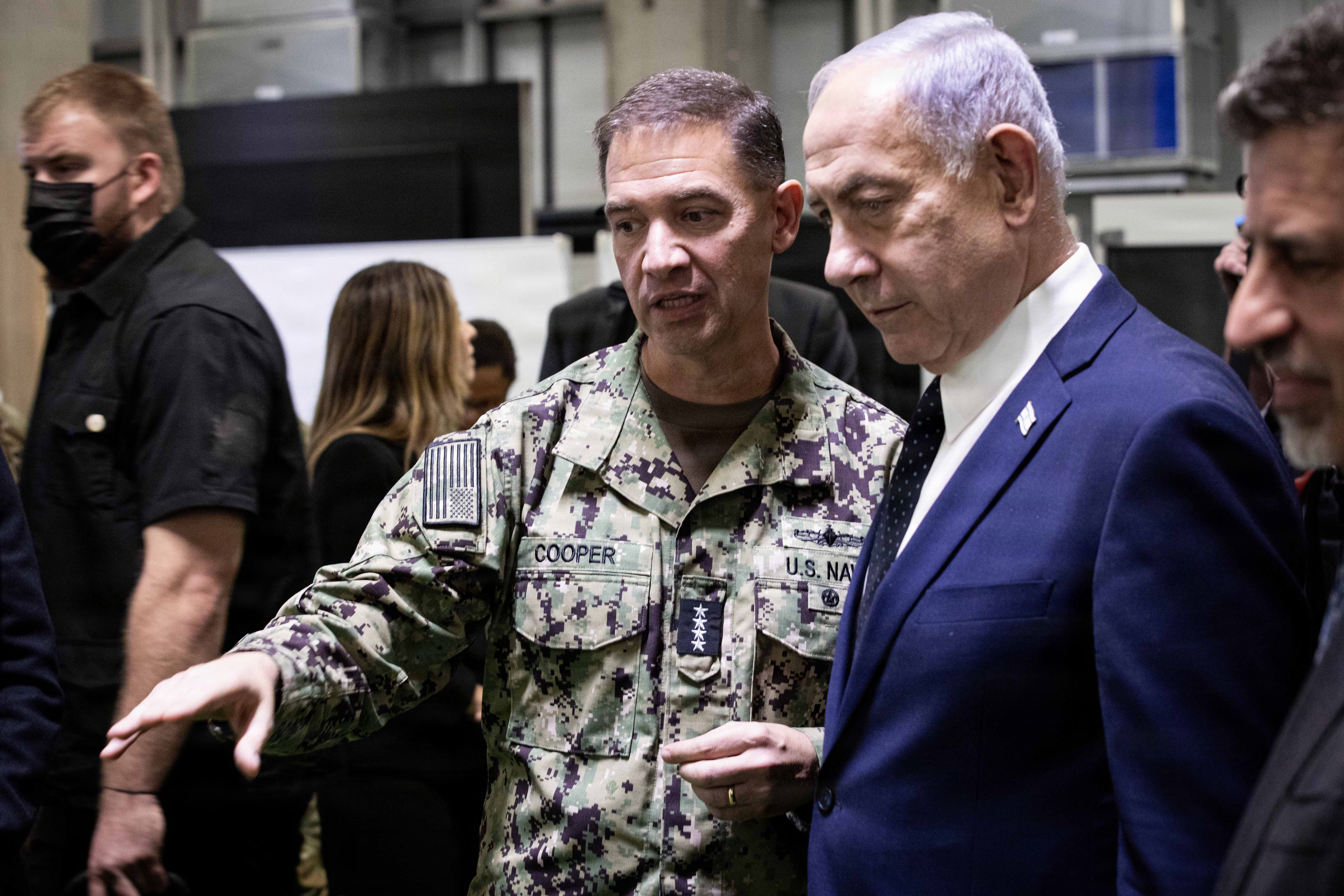
Cooper with Prime Minister Benjamin Netanyahu while on a visit to Israel, 28 October 2025

Cooper also continued developing the partnerships in regional air defense that Kurilla had started, and conducted his own debriefing of Israeli–U.S. actions during the Twelve-Day War. He began preparations for a possible second conflict. On 24 January, he visited Tel Aviv, holding meetings with Israel Defense Forces Chief of Staff Lt. Gen. Eyal Zamir and other senior officials to reinforce close strategic military cooperation amid a broader U.S. military buildup in the Middle East. Zamir was critical in convincing Cooper that a war with Iran would be viable, and Cooper gave his support to the first two steps of the proposed Israeli plan: the assassination of Ali Khamenei and strikes against Iran's ballistic missile and drone programs. In his talks with Trump, Cooper focused on the military aspects of such an operation rather than on whether or not it would be a good decision to go to war. He did not emphasize to Trump the risk from the potential closure of the Strait of Hormuz.

On 6 February 2026, Cooper took part in the indirect negotiations between Iran and the United States that were held in Muscat, Oman, along with Steve Witkoff and Jared Kushner. The following day, Witkoff and Kushner visited Cooper aboard USS Abraham Lincoln at his invitation. On 26 February, Cooper and chairman of the Joint Chiefs of Staff Dan Caine briefed Donald Trump on military options with regard to Iran. Cooper began the U.S. airstrikes on Iran on 28 February on the order of Trump. On the first day, he stated that the goal of CENTCOM's operation was to dismantle the Islamic Revolutionary Guard Corps. Cooper also wrote a letter addressed to U.S. troops in the Middle East, telling them that they will "change the course of human history."

Cooper was the main American architect of the campaign. He and his team spent the weeks before the war identifying targets in Iran that enabled it to project power beyond its borders. Since the war began, Cooper has been in almost daily contact with Lt. Gen. Eyal Zamir, coordinating with the Israeli military, and also coordinating with almost a dozen Arab countries. Cooper made Iran's military capabilities the focus of the U.S. campaign, including their missile launch sites and their navy, while leaving targets related to the goal of regime change to Israel. He issued an update on the operation on 3 March, claiming to have eliminated the Iranian Navy. On 5 March he said that the next phase of the war would be targeting Iran's missile production capacity. Cooper confirmed on 11 March that the military is using artificial intelligence tools in the war, but said that "humans will always make final decisions" on targeting. On 9 April, after the ceasefire went into effect, he claimed that U.S. and Israel inflicted a "generational military defeat" on Iran, and that its conventional military "has been eliminated."

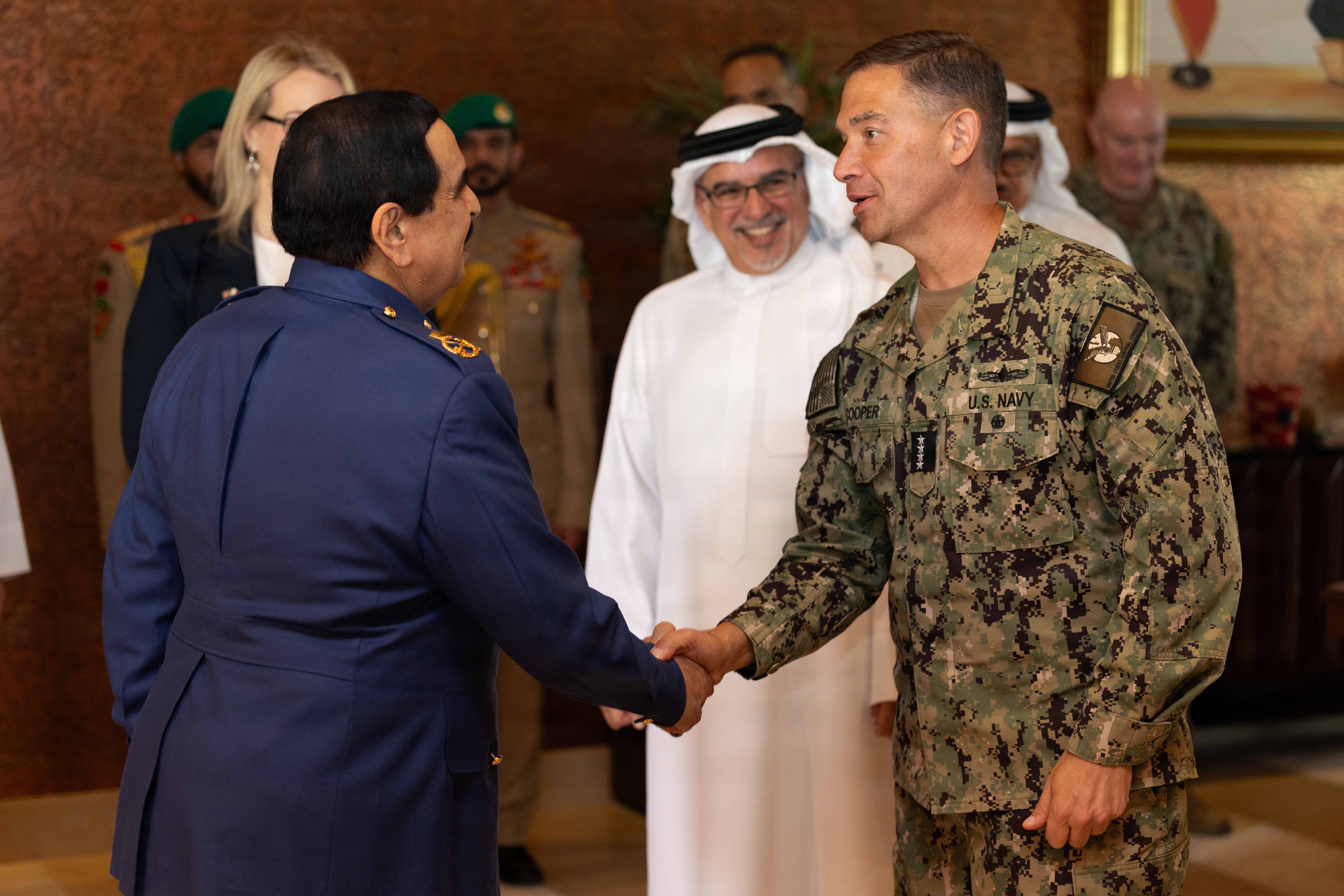
Cooper in Bahrain with King Hamad bin Isa Al Khalifa, Crown Prince Salman bin Hamad Al Khalifa, and U.S. Ambassador Stephanie Hallett, 13 April 2026

Cooper and Fifth Fleet commander Curt Renshaw met King Hamad bin Isa Al Khalifa of Bahrain and his prime minister, Salman bin Hamad Al Khalifa, on 13 April in Manama. On 15 April, Cooper announced that the naval blockade of Iran has been "fully implemented" and all maritime traffic to and from Iran has been "completely halted." Central Command made plans to resume combat operations against Iran, and he reportedly briefed Trump on military options along with Dan Caine on 29 April. On 4 May, he said that the U.S. Navy has set up a "defense umbrella" for ships to pass the Strait of Hormuz, as part of Operation Project Freedom. He gave a testimony to Congress on 14 May, claiming that the war achieved all of its objectives to "significantly degrade" Iran's military capabilities, while also acknowledging the Iran still has the ability to threaten shipping in the Strait of Hormuz. Cooper also said that the U.S. has military options for reopening the strait.

In early July 2026, Cooper and CENTCOM hosted a regional security dialogue in Bahrain for Arab country military leaders, which for the first time included those from Syria and Lebanon, as the U.S. works to counter Iranian regional influence. In addition to defense cooperation, the meeting focused on ensuring freedom of navigation in the Strait of Hormuz. In late July, amidst the two-week bombing campaign in southern Iran, Cooper told the Pentagon, the Joint Chiefs of Staff, and the White House that most designated targets have been hit, degrading Iran's ability to threaten shipping in the Strait of Hormuz. His advice to stop the air campaign, along with that of Caine and others, influenced Trump's decision to halt the strikes on 24 July.

On 16 August CENTCOM posted a statement from Cooper that he had visited USS Abraham Lincoln, wishing the crew good conditions on their journey home, and that "Of the U.S. Navy's 11 active aircraft carriers, the Lincoln currently has among the lowest number of cases related to mental health". In mid-September, Cooper organized a meeting of military chiefs from Israel and several Arab countries in Germany, focused on security cooperation. The attendees included IDF chief of staff Zamir, who briefed them on Israeli operations. Cooper assured them that the US will not withdraw its forces from the Middle East. On 10–11 September, Cooper flew to Saudi Arabia for meetings with Saudi leaders as the Houthis made advances against Saudi-backed Yemeni forces during the 2026 Yemen offensives. On 14 September he spoke with Saudi Crown Prince Mohammed bin Salman.

Cooper visited the Strait of Hormuz on 25 October, and that same day CENTCOM announced that over 1.5 billion barrels of oil and 3,000 commercial ships transited the strait with the support of American forces in the previous six months. He briefed Trump, Vance, and other senior officials on the state of the Iran war on 29 October, as Trump wanted to know the status of the naval blockade on Iran. On 5 November, Cooper appeared on a podcast that he launched, "Inside CENTCOM", where he was interview by the command's senior enlisted leader, Fleet Master Chief Lateef Compton.

== Awards and decorations ==
Cooper has been described as one of the most decorated officers in the U.S. military.

Surface Warfare Officer Pin
Defense Distinguished Service Medal with one C device	Navy Distinguished Service Medal with one gold award star	Defense Superior Service Medal with one bronze oak leaf cluster
Legion of Merit with four gold award stars	Bronze Star Medal	Defense Meritorious Service Medal
Meritorious Service Medal with four award stars	Joint Service Commendation Medal	Navy and Marine Corps Commendation Medal with four award stars
Joint Service Achievement Medal	Navy and Marine Corps Achievement Medal	Joint Meritorious Unit Award with two oak leaf clusters
Navy Unit Commendation	Navy Meritorious Unit Commendation with one silver service star	Meritorious Team Commendation with Operational Distinguishing Device
Navy "E" Ribbon with wreathed Battle E device	National Defense Service Medal with service star	Armed Forces Expeditionary Medal
Southwest Asia Service Medal with two service stars	Afghanistan Campaign Medal with service star	Global War on Terrorism Expeditionary Medal
Global War on Terrorism Service Medal	Korea Defense Service Medal	Armed Forces Service Medal with service star
Humanitarian Service Medal with two service stars	Military Outstanding Volunteer Service Medal	Navy Sea Service Deployment Ribbon with silver service star
Navy and Marine Corps Overseas Service Ribbon with three service stars	Special Operations Service Ribbon	Defence Cooperation Medal (Japan)
Order of National Security Merit, Cheonsu Medal (Republic of Korea)	NATO Medal for the former Yugoslavia	Kuwait Liberation Medal (Saudi Arabia)
Kuwait Liberation Medal (Kuwait)	Navy Expert Rifleman Medal	Navy Expert Pistol Shot Medal
Command at Sea insignia
Office of the Secretary of Defense Identification Badge
Presidential Service Badge
United States Central Command Badge

== Dates of promotion ==
Rank	Branch	Date
Ensign	Navy	1989
Lieutenant junior grade	Navy	1991
Lieutenant	Navy	1993
Lieutenant commander	Navy	11 August 1997
Commander	Navy	31 July 2003
Captain	Navy	19 June 2009
Rear admiral (lower half)	Navy	13 July 2016
Rear admiral	Navy	28 March 2019
Vice admiral	Navy	29 April 2021
Admiral	Navy	29 June 2025

== Personal life ==
Brad and Susan at Cairo International Airport, 2025

He is married to Susan Cooper, who is a speech-language pathologist, and they have two children.

Cooper was briefly a fellow of the Asia Pacific Center for Security Studies.

== Notes ==
Military offices
Preceded by James Kilby	Commanding Officer of USS Russell (DDG-59); 2007–2008	Succeeded by Jeff D. Weston
Preceded by Robert N. Hein	Commanding Officer of USS Gettysburg (CG-64); 2013–2015	Succeeded by John Schmidt
Preceded by William D. Byrne Jr.	Commander of United States Naval Forces Korea; 2016–2018	Succeeded by Michael E. Boyle
Preceded by Marvin Thompson	Commander of Expeditionary Strike Group 7; 2018–2019	Succeeded by Fred W. Kacher
Preceded by James T. Loeblein	Chief of Legislative Affairs of the United States Navy; 2019–2020	Succeeded by Sara A. Joyner
Preceded by Roy Kitchener	Commander, Naval Surface Force Atlantic; 2020–2021	Succeeded by Brendan McLane
Preceded by Samuel Paparo	Commander of the United States Naval Forces Central Command; 2021–2024	Succeeded by George Wikoff
Preceded by Gregory Guillot	Deputy Commander of the United States Central Command; 2024–2025	Succeeded by Sean Salene; Acting
Preceded by Michael Kurilla	Commander of the United States Central Command; 2025–present	Incumbent
