= Stan Arthur =

United States Navy admiral

Stanley R. Arthur
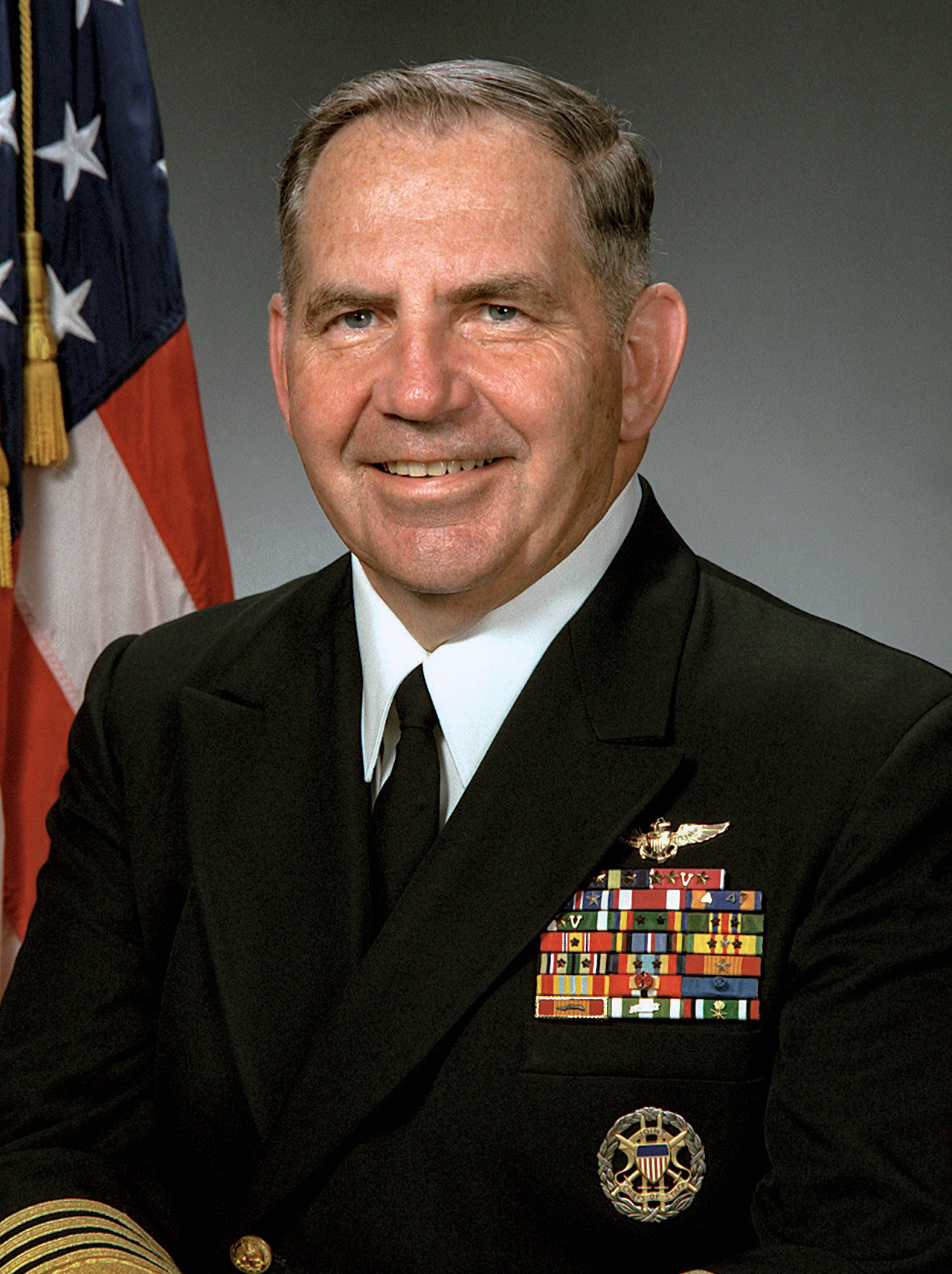
- Stan Arthur
- Born: September 27, 1935 (age 91); Jackson, Ohio, U.S.
- Military career
- Allegiance: United States
- Branch: United States Navy
- Service years: 1957–1995
- Rank: Admiral
- Nickname: Bear
- Commands: Vice Chief of Naval Operations; United States Seventh Fleet; Carrier Group 7
- Conflicts: Vietnam War; Gulf War
- Awards: Navy Distinguished Service Medal (3); Legion of Merit (4 with Combat "V"); Distinguished Flying Cross (11)

Admiral Stanley Roger Arthur (born September 27, 1935) is a retired admiral of the United States Navy who served as the Vice Chief of Naval Operations from 1992 to 1995.

== Military career ==
Arthur was born in Jackson, Ohio, and was commissioned in United States Navy through the Naval Reserve Officer Training Corps Program in June 1957. Following completion of flight training, he was designated as a Naval Aviator in 1958.

Arthur flew more than 500 combat missions in the A-4 Skyhawk during the Vietnam War, receiving 11 separate awards of the Distinguished Flying Cross and over 50 separate awards of the Air Medal, making him one of the most highly decorated combat aviators of that conflict. During the 1970s and 1980s, he also held command of a carrier-based attack squadron, a carrier air wing, an aircraft carrier, a carrier battle group (Carrier Group 7), and was Deputy Chief of Naval Operations (Logistics) (OP-O4).

In December 1990, then-Vice Admiral Arthur took command of the United States Seventh Fleet, headquartered in Japan. At the time, the Seventh Fleet staff also had oversight of U.S. Naval Forces Central Command (NAVCENT) in Bahrain and was forward deployed in the Persian Gulf. Thus, Vice Admiral Arthur oversaw the buildup for the Persian Gulf War, which broke out on 17 January 1991. He directed the operations of more than 96,000 Navy and Marine Corps personnel and 130 United States Navy and allied ships. This represented the largest United States naval armada amassed since World War II. He continued directing United States Naval Forces Central Command until 24 April 1991, when he turned over command of NAVCENT to Rear Admiral Ray Taylor. Arthur then returned to Fleet Activities Yokosuka to take up Seventh Fleet duties once more. He continued to command Seventh Fleet until July 1992.

Arthur assumed duties as the Vice Chief of Naval Operations on 6 July 1992. He retired from active military service on 1 June 1995. In that job as the Navy's number two officer, he was also the Navy's "Gray Eagle," the senior-most naval aviator on active duty, immediately after the 1991 Tailhook Incident. Arthur was nominated by President Bill Clinton to head U.S. military forces in the Pacific as the prospective Commander of United States Pacific Command, but the nomination was withdrawn after Senator Dave Durenberger (R-Minnesota), questioned Arthur's handling of sexual harassment allegations brought by one of the Senator's constituents, a female navy student helicopter pilot, Ensign Rebecca Hansen, who was attrited from flight training for substandard flight performance.

Rather than let the Pacific Fleet job go unfilled during what might have been protracted congressional hearings, Arthur elected to retire from the Navy on February 1, 1995, as a four-star admiral. Critics charged that the Chief of Naval Operations, Admiral Mike Boorda, a non-aviator, had professionally sacrificed Arthur to improve the navy's image on sexual harassment following the Tailhook Incident. The volume of complaints prompted Boorda to issue an unusual public defense of Arthur and his decision not to fight for the nomination:

Stan Arthur is an officer of integrity... who chose to take this selfless action... in the interests of more rapidly filling a critical leadership position. Those who postulate other reasons for the withdrawal are simply wrong.

== After military ==
Arthur joined Lockheed Martin in 1996 and was appointed President, Missiles and Fire Control – Orlando, Florida, in July 1999.

== Education ==
Arthur is a graduate of Miami University in Oxford, Ohio. He later earned a second bachelor's degree in aeronautical engineering from the Naval Postgraduate School and received his master's degree in administration from George Washington University.

== Awards and decorations ==

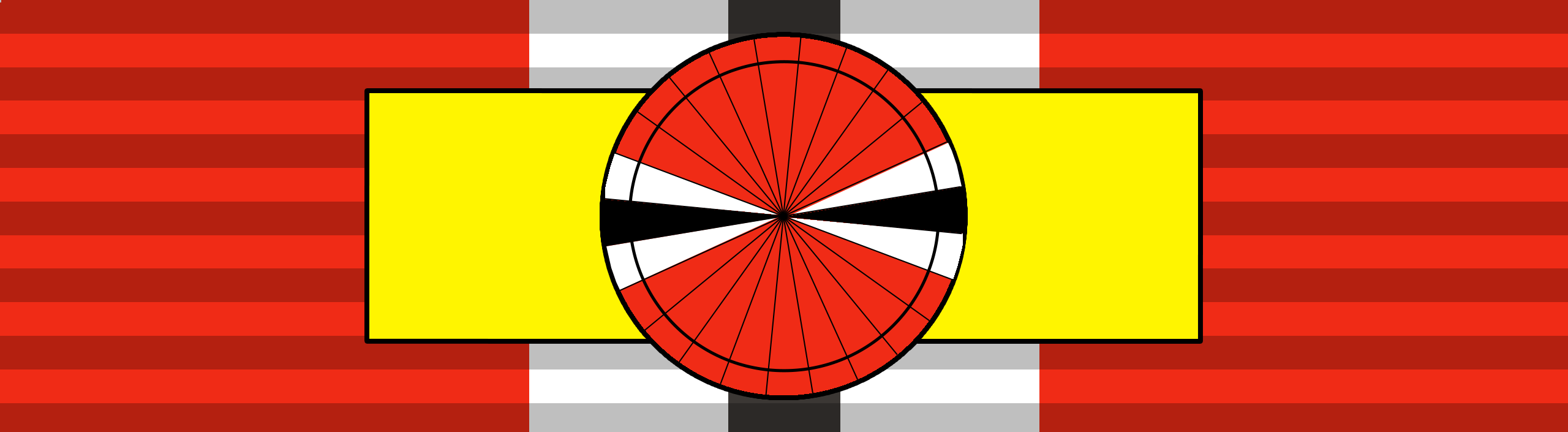

In 1996 Arthur received the Admiral Arleigh A. Burke Leadership Award from the Navy League. He was inducted into the Naval Aviation Hall of Honor in 2008. He also received the Gray Eagle Award.

The Admiral Stan Arthur Award For Logistics Excellence is presented annually in his honor, and recognizes military and civilian logisticians who epitomize excellence in logistics planning and execution.

Military offices
Preceded by Jerome L. Johnson	Vice Chief of Naval Operations; 1992–1995	Succeeded by Joseph Prueher
