= United States Fifth Fleet =

Numbered fleet of the United States Navy

Fifth Fleet
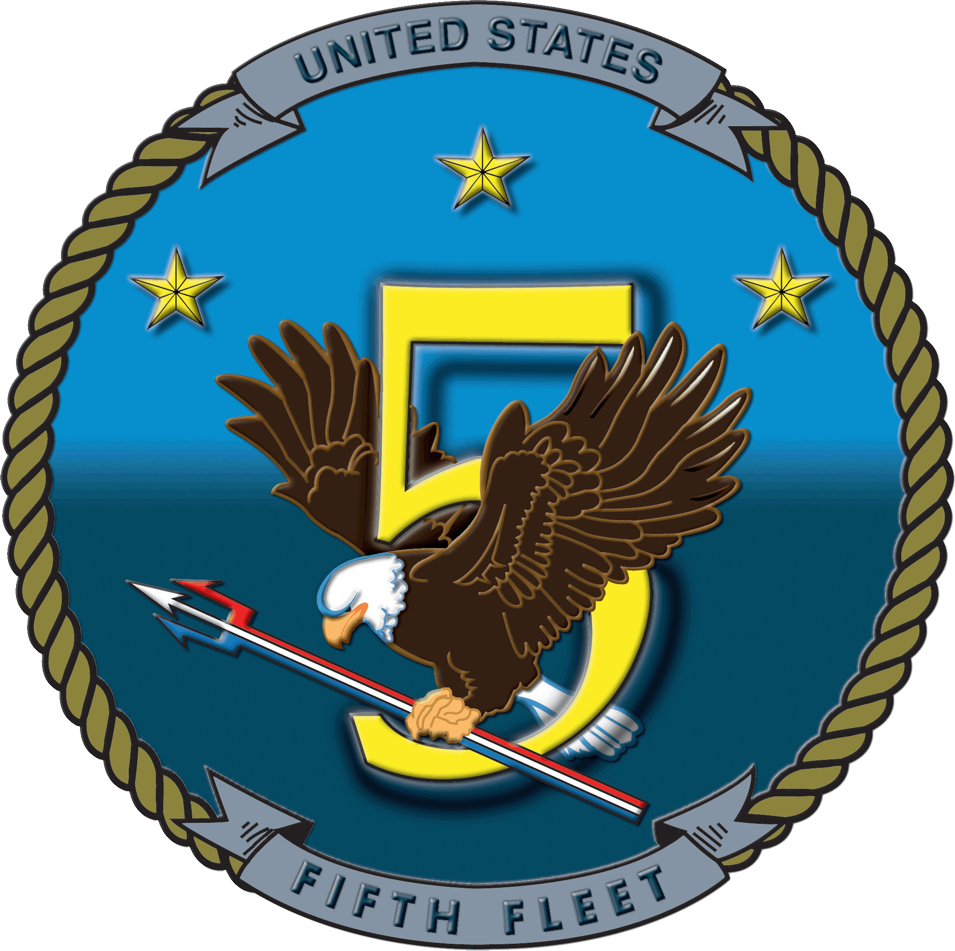
- The U.S. Fifth Fleet's emblem
- Active: 26 April 1944 – January 1947; 1 July 1995 – present
- Country: United States
- Branch: United States Navy
- Part of: U.S. Central Command (CENTCOM); U.S. Naval Forces Central Command (NAVCENT)
- Garrison/HQ: Naval Support Activity Bahrain, Bahrain
- Engagements: World War II; Gilbert and Marshall Islands campaign; Operation Hailstone; Mariana and Palau Islands campaign; Battle of Iwo Jima; Battle of Okinawa; Global War on Terrorism; Middle Eastern crisis; Red Sea crisis; 2026 Iran war
- Battle honours: Pacific Theatre of World War II

Commanders
- Current commander: VADM Curt Renshaw
- Command Master Chief: CMDCM Jason M. Dunn
- Notable commanders: ADM Raymond A. Spruance, USN

The Fifth Fleet is a numbered fleet of the United States Navy. Its area of responsibility encompasses approximately 2.5 million mi^{2} (6.5 million km^{2}) and includes the Persian Gulf, Red Sea, Arabian Sea, and parts of the Indian Ocean. It shares a commander and headquarters with U.S. Naval Forces Central Command (NAVCENT) in Bahrain. Fifth Fleet/NAVCENT is a component command of, and reports to, United States Central Command (CENTCOM).

Established during World War II in 1944, the Fifth Fleet conducted extensive operations that led to the defeat of Japanese forces in the Central Pacific, including battles for the Mariana Islands campaign, Iwo Jima, and Okinawa. In 1947, two years after the Allied victory, it was stood down. After remaining inactive for 48 years, the Fifth Fleet was reactivated in 1995. It contributed significant forces in the Global War on Terrorism and continues to project US naval power in the Middle East.

== World War II ==
The Fifth Fleet was initially established during World War II on 26 April 1944 from the Central Pacific Force under the command of Admiral Raymond Spruance. Central Pacific Force was itself part of Pacific Ocean Areas. The ships of the Fifth Fleet also formed the basis of the Third Fleet, which was the designation of the "Big Blue Fleet" when under the command of Admiral William F. Halsey, Jr. (Note: The "Big Blue Fleet" was the name given to the main fleet of the U.S. Navy in the Pacific. The term stems from pre-war planning, called the "color plans" because each nation included was given a color code name. In these plans for potential conflicts, the British Royal Navy was "Red," the German Navy was "Black," and so forth. The Imperial Japanese Navy was termed the "Orange Fleet," while the U.S. fleet was the "Blue Fleet". The "Big Blue Fleet" was the massive fleet that the U.S. Navy anticipated it would field to win a war with Japan and which it thought largely would come into being by late 1943 or early 1944.) Spruance and Halsey would alternate command of the fleet for major operations, allowing the other admiral and his staff time to prepare for the subsequent one. A secondary benefit was confusing the Japanese into thinking that they were actually two separate fleets as the fleet designation flipped back and forth. Under Admiral Spruance, the Fifth Fleet was, by June 1944, the largest combat fleet in the world, with 535 warships.

While operating under Spruance's command as the Fifth Fleet, the fleet took part in the Mariana Islands campaign of June–August 1944, the Iwo Jima campaign of February–March 1945, and the Okinawa campaign of April–June 1945. During the course of these operations, it conducted Operation Hailstone (a major raid against the Japanese naval base at Truk) in February 1944, defeated the Imperial Japanese Navy in the Battle of the Philippine Sea in June 1944, and blunted the Japanese Operation Ten-Go – sinking the Japanese battleship Yamato in the process – in April 1945.

The British Pacific Fleet operated as part of the Fifth Fleet from March to May 1945 under the designation Task Force 57. Halsey then relieved Spruance of command and the British ships, like the rest of the Fifth Fleet, were resubordinated to the Third Fleet.

The Fifth Fleet's next major combat operation would have been Operation Olympic, the invasion of Kyushu in the Japanese Home Islands, scheduled to begin on 1 November 1945. The size of the operation resulted in plans for the Fifth Fleet to function as a separate command, operating simultaneously with the Third Fleet for the first time. The atomic bombings of Hiroshima and Nagasaki and subsequent cessation of hostilities in August 1945 made this operation unnecessary, and the Fifth Fleet did not return to combat again during the war.

The commanders of the Fifth Fleet during this era were Admirals Spruance (26 April 1944 – 8 November 1945), John Henry Towers (8 November 1945 – 18 January 1946), Frederick C. Sherman (18 January 1946 – 3 September 1946), and Alfred E. Montgomery (5 September 1946 – 1 January 1947). The Fifth Fleet was deactivated in January 1947. The position of Commander, Fifth Fleet, became Commander, First Task Fleet. Montgomery became Commander, First Task Fleet, upon the deactivation of the Fifth Fleet.

== In the Middle East after 1995 ==
Prior to the first Gulf War in 1990–1991, U.S. naval operations in the Persian Gulf region were directed by the Commander, Middle Eastern Force (COMMIDEASTFOR). Since this organization was considered insufficient to manage large-scale combat operations during the Gulf War, the Seventh Fleet — primarily responsible for the Western Pacific and Indian Ocean and normally based in Japan – was given the temporary task of managing the force during the period. However, no numbered fleet existed permanently within the USCENTCOM area of responsibility. In 1995, John Scott Redd proposed and founded the only new U.S. Navy Fleet in half a century, serving as the first Commander, Fifth Fleet (COMFIFTHFLT) since World War II. After a 48-year hiatus, the Fifth Fleet was reactivated, replacing COMMIDEASTFOR, and it now directs operations in the Persian Gulf, Red Sea, and Arabian Sea. Its headquarters are at NSA Bahrain located in Manama, Bahrain.

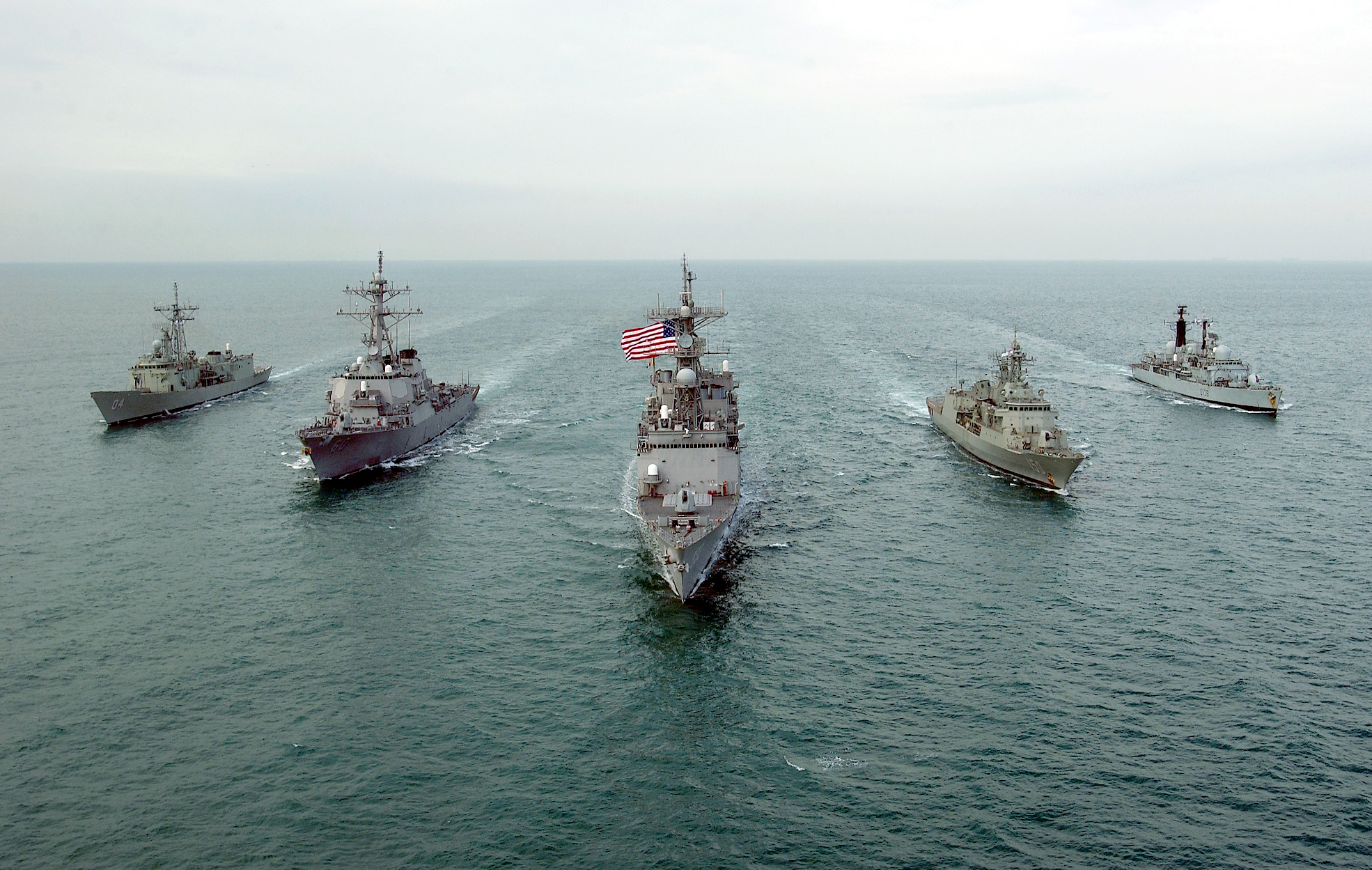
U.S. Navy, Royal Navy, and Royal Australian Navy destroyers and frigates on joint operations in the Persian Gulf.

For the early years of its existence, its forces normally consisted of an Aircraft Carrier Battle Group (CVBG), an Amphibious Ready Group (ARG), surface combatants, submarines, maritime patrol and reconnaissance aircraft, and logistics ships. After the September 11 terrorist attack and the beginning of Operation Enduring Freedom, the naval strategy of the U.S. changed. Consequently, the policy of always maintaining a certain number of ships in various parts of the world also changed.

However, its usual configuration now includes a Carrier Strike Group (CSG), Amphibious Ready Group or Expeditionary Strike Group (ESG), and other ships and aircraft with almost 15,000 people serving afloat and 1,000 support personnel ashore.

Carrier Strike Group Three formed the core of the naval power during the initial phase of Operation Enduring Freedom in 2001. Commander, Carrier Group Three, Rear Admiral Thomas E. Zelibor, arrived in the Arabian Sea on 12 September 2001 and was subsequently designated Commander Task Force 50 (CTF 50), commanding multiple carrier strike groups and coalition forces. The Task Force conducted strikes against Al-Qaeda and Taliban forces in Afghanistan. Task Force 50 comprised over 59 ships from six nations including six aircraft carriers, stretching over 800 nautical miles.

Naval operations in the Middle East were the subject of DOD Exercise Millennium Challenge 2002, during which unanticipated maneuvers by opposing forces director Lieutenant General Paul Van Riper USMC (retd.) led to heavy losses to the 'imaginary' exercise U.S. fleet.

In August 2002, Marines from the 22nd Marine Expeditionary Unit (Special Operations Capable (MEU) (SOC)) carried out a long-range deployment exercise from the amphibious assault ship USS Wasp (LHD 1) into Djibouti. During the deployment the MEU also participated in Operation Sea Eagle in the Gulf of Aden and Operation Infinite Anvil in the Horn of Africa.

Fifth Fleet forces peaked in early 2003, when five USN aircraft carriers (CV and CVNs), six amphibious assault ships (LHAs and LHDs) and their embarked Marine Corps air ground combat elements, their escorting and supply vessels, and over 30 Royal Navy vessels were under its command.

In the Persian Gulf, United States Coast Guard surface ships attached to the Fifth Fleet were under Commander, Destroyer Squadron 50 (CDS-50) commanded by Captain John W. Peterson of the Navy. Coast Guard cutters Boutwell, Walnut, and the four patrol boats were part of this group. The shore detachments, MCSD and Patrol Forces Southwest Asia also operated under the command of CDS-50. For actual operations, the Coast Guard forces were part of two different task forces. The surface units were part of Task Force 55 (CTF-55). Command of CTF-55 actually shifted during OIF. Initially, Rear Admiral Barry M. Costello, Commander of the Constellation Battle Group, commanded CTF-55. The surface forces were designated Task Group 55.1 (TG-55.1) with Commander Destroyer Squadron 50 (CDS-50) as the task group commander. In mid-April, the Constellation Battle Group left the NAG and the Destroyer Squadron 50 staff commanded TF-55 for the remainder of OIF major combat operations. In the aftermath of the fall of Baghdad in April 2003, the very large force of ships was quickly drawn down.

On 6 May 2005, a party of Marines reportedly landed in Somaliland, the autonomous and self-declared state in northern Somalia. The landings were purportedly conducted to carry out searches, as well as to question locals regarding the whereabouts of terrorist suspects. Three ships, including a helicopter carrier, were reported in a nearby anchorage, likely a MEU/ARG. United States military officials denied the allegations and said operations were not being conducted in Somaliland.

On 3 January 2012, following the end of the ten-day Velayat 90 naval maneuvers by the Iranian Navy in the Strait of Hormuz, the Iranian Army chief of staff, General Ataollah Salehi, was quoted by the state news agency IRNA as warning the United States to not deploy John C. Stennis back to the Persian Gulf. On 4 January 2011, Fars News Agency reported that a bill was being prepared for the Iranian Parliament to bar foreign naval vessels from entering the Persian Gulf unless they receive permission from the Iranian navy, with Iranian lawmaker Nader Qazipour noting: "If the military vessels and warships of any country want to pass via the Strait of Hormuz without coordination and permission of Iran's navy forces, they should be stopped by the Iranian armed forces." Also, Iranian Defense Minister Ahmad Vahidi reiterated that "transnational forces" have no place in the Persian Gulf region. On 6 January 2012, armed Iranian speedboats reportedly harassed two U.S. naval vessels, the amphibious transport dock New Orleans and the Coast Guard cutter Adak, as they transited the Strait of Hormuz into the Persian Gulf.

On 9 January 2012, Carrier Strike Group One, led by the carrier Carl Vinson, joined Carrier Strike Group Three in the North Arabian Sea, with Carrier Strike Group Nine, led by the carrier Abraham Lincoln, en route to the Arabian Sea amid rising tension between the United States and the Islamic Republic of Iran over U.S. naval access to the Strait of Hormuz. On 19 January 2012, Carrier Strike Group Nine entered the Fifth Fleet's area of responsibility (AOR) and relieved Carrier Strike Group Three. That same day during an interview on the Charlie Rose program, Mohammad Khazaee, Iran's ambassador to the United Nations, stated that Iran would consider closing the Strait of Hormuz if Iran's security was endangered.

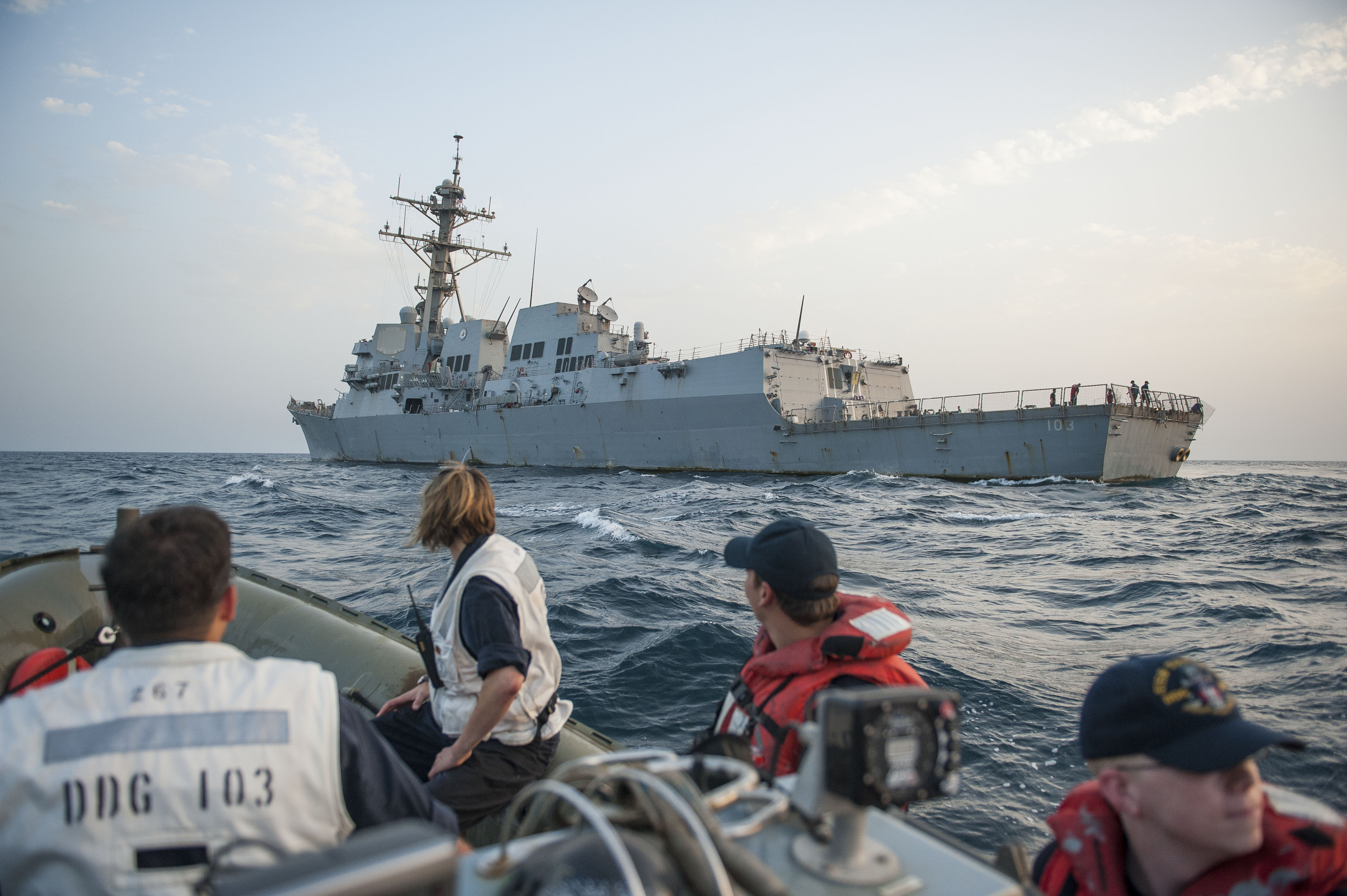
Arleigh Burke-class destroyer USS Truxtun (DDG-103) transits the Persian Gulf during maritime security operations, October 2014

For December 2012 and January 2013, Carrier Strike Group Three was the only carrier strike group operating with the U.S. Fifth Fleet until relieved by the Carrier Strike Group Ten. This is because of the temporary two-month rotation of the Carrier Strike Group Eight back to the United States in order to resurface the flight deck of that group's flagship, the carrier Dwight D. Eisenhower. Dwight D. Eisenhower, Carrier Air Wing Seven, and the guided-missile cruiser Hue City returned to base on 19 December 2012, and the guided missile destroyers Jason Dunham, Farragut, and Winston S. Churchill were scheduled to return to base in March 2013.

In September 2016, Commander Amphibious Task Group, Commodore Andrew Burns, set off from the UK with Ocean, along with helicopters from 845 Naval Air Squadron, No. 662 Squadron AAC and No. 27 Squadron RAF, Bulwark, and element of 3 Commando Brigade HQ Royal Marines, RFA Mounts Bay and MV Eddystone Point under his flag. This deployment was known as the Joint Expeditionary Force (Maritime) 2016. The Amphibious Task Group was planned to sail to the Red Sea and Persian Gulf, where Burns was to assume command of the United States Fifth Fleet Task Force 50 until March 2017.

On 1 December 2018, Commander, Fifth Fleet, Vice Admiral Scott A. Stearney was found dead in his residence in Bahrain. No foul play was suspected. Deputy commander Rear Admiral Paul J. Schlise assumed command in his place. Vice Admiral Jim Malloy flew to Bahrain to provide support. Malloy was formally nominated to succeed Stearney on 4 December and quickly confirmed by voice vote of the full United States Senate on 6 December. Vice Adm. Malloy assumed command on 7 December.

=== 2026 war damage ===
On 28 February 2026, as part of a broader retaliatory wave following joint U.S.–Israeli strikes on Iran, Iranian missiles and drones struck the Naval Support Activity Bahrain, the headquarters of the U.S. Fifth Fleet in Manama. Satellite imagery later confirmed that two AN/GSC-52B satellite communications (SATCOM) terminals were destroyed, along with damage to several warehouses and at least one base service facility. The acting Navy Secretary noted Iran "blew the hell out of" USN infrastructure in Bahrain, and some reports described the base as destroyed.

== Composition ==
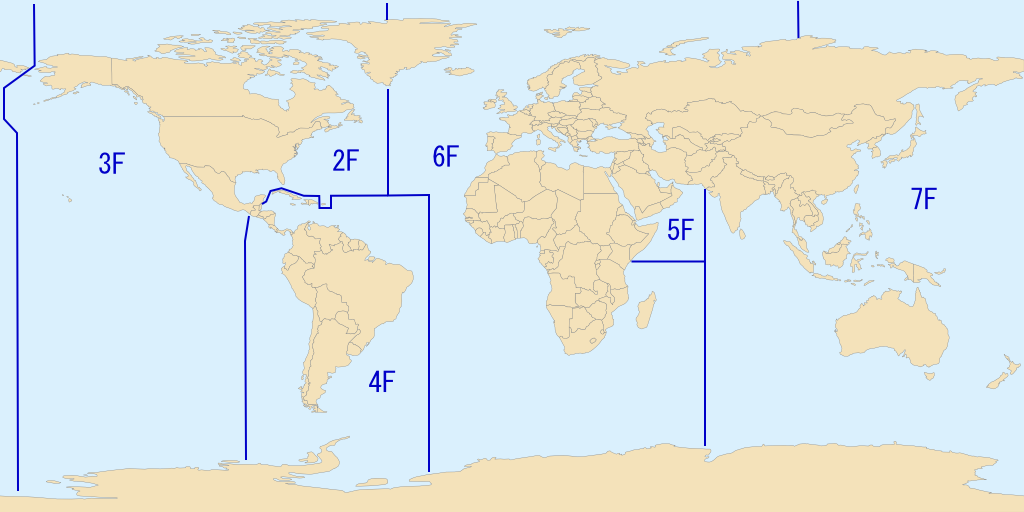
The Fifth Fleet's area of responsibility, 2009.

- Task Force 50, Battle Force (~1 x Forward Deployed Carrier Strike Group). From 2010 through 2013, the U.S. maintained two aircraft carriers east of Suez, known as a "2.0 carrier presence," although it sometimes temporarily dipped below that level. The heightened presence aimed to provide air and sea striking power for U.S. operations in Iraq and Afghanistan, to deter Iran from problematic behavior in the region and keep the Strait of Hormuz open.
- Task Force 51, Amphibious Force (~1 x Expeditionary Strike Group)/Expeditionary Strike Group Five/TF 59 (Manama, Bahrain)
- Task Force 52, mining/demining force
- Task Force 53, Logistics Force/Sealift Logistics Command Central, Military Sealift Command (MSC replenishment ships plus C-130 Hercules, C-9 Skytrain II and/or C-40 Clipper aircraft)
- Task Force 54, (dual-hatted as Task Force 74) Submarine Force
- Task Force 55, June 2003: mine clearing force, including elements from the U.S. Navy Marine Mammal Program. Task Group 55.4 included a US Navy special clearance team, two explosive ordnance disposal (EOD) units, a detachment of MH-53E Sea Dragon helicopters from Helicopter Mine Countermeasures Squadron FOURTEEN, a British unit, and Clearance Diving Team 3, from the Australian Clearance Diving Branch. The ships involved included the dock landing ship Gunston Hall. The Arleigh Burke-class guided-missile destroyer USS Delbert D. Black (DDG 119) was more recently assigned to TF55.
- Task Force 56, Navy Expeditionary Combat Command force.
  - CTG 56.1 Explosive Ordnance Disposal / Expeditionary Diving and Salvage
  - CTG 56.2 Naval Construction Forces
  - CTG 56.3 Navy Expeditionary Logistics Support Group Forward; NSA Bahrain. Provides logistics support for USN/USA/USMC, cargo movement and customs throughout the area of responsibility.
  - CTG 56.4 U.S. Army Civil Affairs
  - CTG 56.5 Maritime Expeditionary Security; Provides anti-Terrorism/Force Protection of land/port/littoral waterway operations for USN and Coalition assets, as well as point defense of strategic platforms and MSC vessels
  - CTG 56.6 Expeditionary Combat Readiness; Provides administrative "Sailor support" for all Individual Augmentees, and administers the Navy Individual Augmentee Combat Training Course and Warrior Transition Program
  - CTG 56.7 Riverine; Provides riverine protection of waterways from illegal smuggling of weapons, drugs and people
- Task Force 57, (dual-hatted as Task Force 72) Patrol and Reconnaissance Force (P-3 and EP-3 Maritime Patrol and Reconnaissance Aircraft)
  - Task Group 57.1 – Lockheed EP-3, VQ-1
  - Task Group 57.2 – in October 2006, consisted of VP-8, VP-9, VP-16, and VP-46.
  - Note that as of 13 October 2011, Officer in Charge, Patrol and Reconnaissance Force Fifth Fleet Det Bahrain (COMPATRECONFORFIFTHFLT DET BAHRAIN (44468)) has been modified to Commander, Patrol and Reconnaissance Wing FIVE SEVEN.
- Task Force 58, Maritime Surveillance Force (Northern Persian Gulf)
- Task Force 59, Expeditionary Force/Contingency Force (when required, e.g. July–August 2006 Lebanon evacuation operation, in conjunction with Joint Task Force Lebanon) In February 2007, it was conducting Maritime Security Operations, and, as of 2 November 2007, it was running a crisis management exercise. The Independence-class littoral combat ship USS Santa Barbara (LCS 32) was a part of TF59 as of late 2025 & early 2026.

=== Coalition Forces Maritime Component Command ===
Together with Naval Forces Central Command, Fifth Fleet oversees four naval task forces monitoring maritime activity:

- Combined Task Force 150 that patrols from Hormuz, halfway across the Arabia Sea, South as far as the Seychelles, through the Gulf of Aden, up through the strait between Djibouti and Yemen known as the Bab Al Mandeb and into the Red Sea and, finally, around the Horn of Africa;
- Combined Task Force 152 patrols the Persian Gulf from the northern end where area of responsibility of CTF 158 ends and down to the Strait of Hormuz between Oman and Iran where the area of responsibility for CTF 150 begins;
- Combined Task Force 151 patrols mostly the same area as CTF 150 but is primarily focused on deterring and disrupting Somali piracy attack on commercial shipping and leisure craft;
- CTF 52 (as above) patrols the same area as CTF 152 but is focused on countermining/demining activity.

== Commanders ==
The commander's position "..was originally titled Commander, Central Pacific Force. On 26 April 1944 it was renamed Commander, Fifth Fleet. It then became Commander, First Task Fleet on 1 January 1947."

=== List of commanders ===
==== During and after Second World War ====
No.	Commander		Term			Ref
No.	Portrait	Name	Took office	Left office	Term length	Ref
1	Raymond A. Spruance	Admiral; Raymond A. Spruance (1886–1969)	26 April 1944	8 November 1945	1 year, 196 days	
2	John Henry Towers	Admiral; John Henry Towers (1885–1955)	8 November 1945	18 January 1946	71 days	
3	Frederick C. Sherman	Vice Admiral; Frederick C. Sherman (1888–1957)	18 January 1946	3 September 1946	228 days	
4	Alfred E. Montgomery	Vice Admiral; Alfred E. Montgomery (1891–1961)	5 September 1946	1 January 1947	118 days	

==== Post Cold War ====
No.	Commander		Term			Ref
No.	Portrait	Name	Took office	Left office	Term length	Ref
1	John Scott Redd	Vice Admiral; John Scott Redd (born 1944)	1 July 1995	June 1996	~336 days	
2	Thomas B. Fargo	Vice Admiral; Thomas B. Fargo (born 1948)	June 1996	27 July 1998	~2 years, 56 days	
3	Charles W. Moore Jr.	Vice Admiral; Charles W. Moore Jr. (born 1946)	27 July 1998	11 February 2002	3 years, 199 days	
4	Timothy J. Keating	Vice Admiral; Timothy J. Keating (born 1948)	11 February 2002	7 October 2003	1 year, 238 days	
5	David C. Nichols	Vice Admiral; David C. Nichols (born 1950)	7 October 2003	3 November 2005	2 years, 27 days	
6	Patrick M. Walsh	Vice Admiral; Patrick M. Walsh (born 1955)	3 November 2005	27 February 2007	1 year, 116 days	
7	Kevin J. Cosgriff	Vice Admiral; Kevin J. Cosgriff	27 February 2007	5 July 2008	1 year, 129 days	
8	William E. Gortney	Vice Admiral; William E. Gortney (born 1955)	5 July 2008	5 July 2010	2 years, 0 days	
9	Mark I. Fox	Vice Admiral; Mark I. Fox (born 1956)	5 July 2010	24 May 2012	1 year, 324 days	
10	John W. Miller	Vice Admiral; John W. Miller	24 May 2012	3 September 2015	3 years, 102 days	
11	Kevin M. Donegan	Vice Admiral; Kevin M. Donegan (born 1958)	3 September 2015	19 September 2017	2 years, 16 days	
12	John C. Aquilino	Vice Admiral; John C. Aquilino (born 1962)	19 September 2017	6 May 2018	229 days	
13	Scott Stearney	Vice Admiral; Scott Stearney (1960–2018)	6 May 2018	1 December 2018	209 days	
-	Paul J. Schlise	Rear Admiral (lower half); Paul J. Schlise; Acting	1 December 2018	7 December 2018	6 days	-
14	James J. Malloy	Vice Admiral; James J. Malloy (born 1963)	7 December 2018	19 August 2019	255 days	
15	Samuel Paparo	Vice Admiral; Samuel Paparo (born 1964)	19 August 2019	5 May 2021	1 year, 259 days	
16	Charles B. Cooper II	Vice Admiral; Charles B. Cooper II (born 1967)	5 May 2021	1 February 2024	2 years, 272 days	
17	George M. Wikoff	Vice Admiral; George M. Wikoff (born 1968)	1 February 2024	5 October 2025	1 year, 246 days	-
18	Curt A. Renshaw	Vice Admiral; Curt A. Renshaw (born 1968)	5 October 2025	Incumbent	1 year, 45 days	-
