= George Wikoff =

U.S. Navy admiral (born 1968)

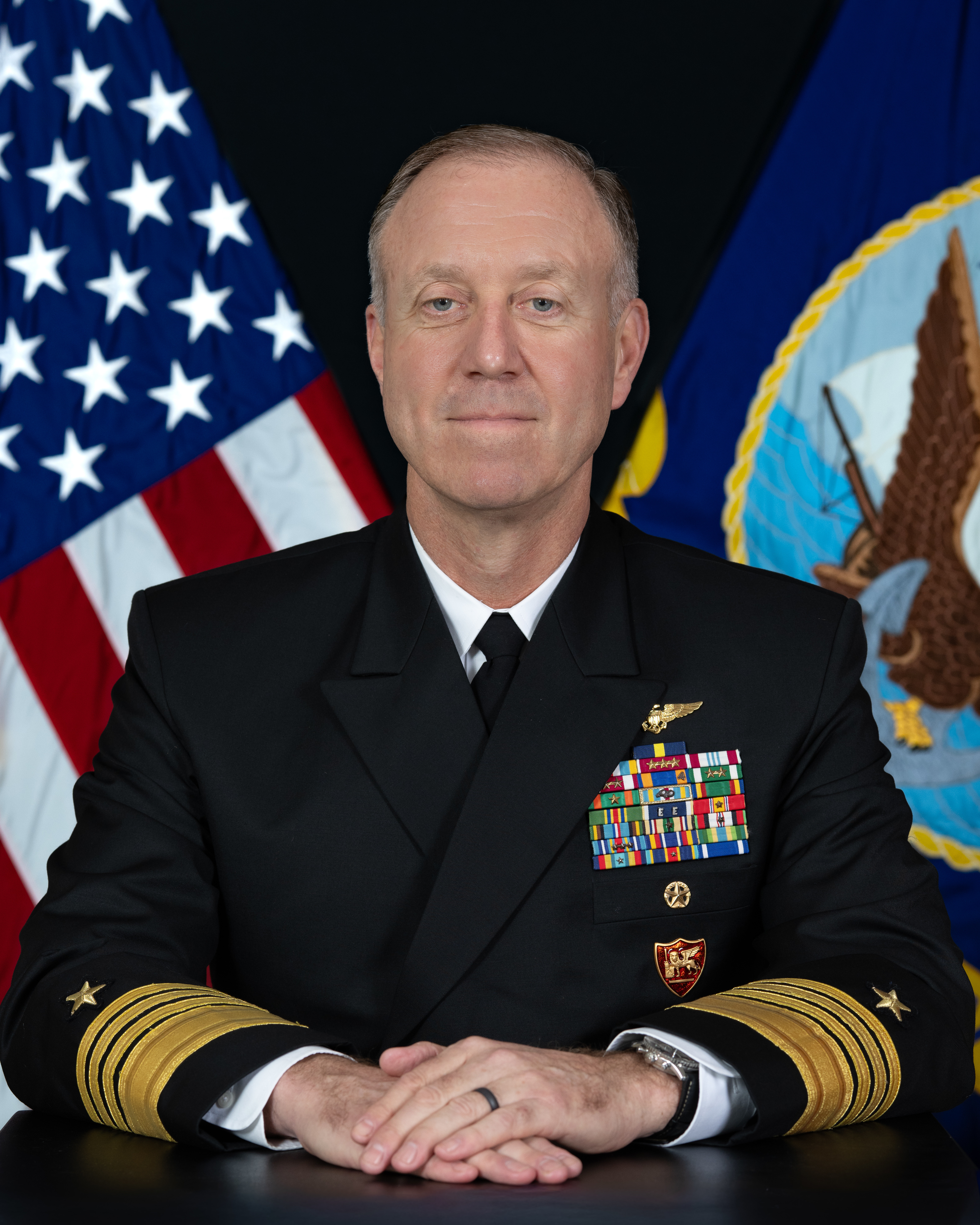
- Born: 1968 (age 57–58); New Brunswick, New Jersey, U.S.
- Education: Catholic University of America; University of Arkansas
- Military career
- Allegiance: United States
- Branch: United States Navy
- Service years: 1990–present
- Rank: Admiral
- Commands: United States Naval Forces Europe and Africa; Allied Joint Force Command Naples; United States Naval Forces Central Command; United States Fifth Fleet; Combined Maritime Forces; Naval Air Forces (acting); Naval Air Force, U.S. Pacific Fleet (acting); Carrier Strike Group 5 Carrier Air Wing 3 VFA-122; VFA-211
- Conflicts: War in Afghanistan; Red Sea crisis; Operation Poseidon Archer; Operation Rough Rider; Twelve-Day War; Operation Midnight Hammer
- Awards: Defense Superior Service Medal; Legion of Merit (4)

George M. Wikoff (born 1968) is an American admiral who has served as the commander of United States Naval Forces Europe and Africa and Allied Joint Force Command Naples since 2025.

Wikoff graduated from George Washington University's Naval Reserve Officers Training Corps in 1990 and became a naval aviator in the United States Navy. He served on several aircraft carriers and was an instructor at TOPGUN. His senior commands included Carrier Air Wing 3, Carrier Strike Group 5, and concurrently the Naval Air Forces and the Naval Air Force, U.S. Pacific Fleet, the latter in an acting capacity from 2023 to 2024. He was also the vice director of the Joint Staff from 2021 to 2023. Wikoff served as the commander of U.S. Naval Forces Central Command, U.S. Fifth Fleet, and Combined Maritime Forces from 2024 to 2025, and oversaw operations during the Red Sea crisis and the Twelve-Day War.

== Early life and education ==
George M. Wikoff was born in 1968 and is a native of New Brunswick, New Jersey. He is a 1990 graduate of the Catholic University of America, and was commissioned through the George Washington University Naval Reserve Officers Training Corps program. Wikoff also earned a master's degree from the University of Arkansas.

== Naval career ==
Wikoff became a naval aviator with experience flying the F-14 Tomcat and the F/A-18 Hornet. He served operationally in Fighter Squadron (VF) 102 aboard USS America (CV-66) and VF-154 forward deployed to Atsugi, Japan on USS Kitty Hawk (CV-63). Command assignments include Strike Fighter Squadron (VFA) 211 deployed aboard USS Enterprise (CVN-65), VFA-122, Carrier Air Wing 3 deployed aboard USS Harry S. Truman (CVN 75), and Carrier Strike Group 5 forward deployed to Yokosuka, Japan aboard USS Ronald Reagan (CVN 76).

Wikoff’s shore assignments include the Naval Strike and Air Warfare Center, as TOPGUN training officer; Navy Personnel Command as placement officer for the Tomcat and Super Hornet communities; Joint Staff as an action officer in the Operations Directorate, Deputy Directorate for Antiterrorism and Homeland Defense (J-34); Chief of Naval Operations staff as air warfare special programs requirements officer (N88); the Combined Air and Space Operations Center as battle director in Qatar; U.S. Naval Forces Central Command as Chief of Staff and Maritime Operations Center Director in Bahrain, Executive Assistant to the Chief of Naval Operations, Joint Staff as Deputy Director for Operations (OT-5) and Assistant Director for Global Integration and Current Operations (J-33), and Vice Director, Joint Staff.

He took office as vice director of the Joint Staff in May 2021. In January 2023 he was nominated for promotion to the grade of vice admiral and assignment as commander of United States Naval Forces Central Command, United States Fifth Fleet, and Combined Maritime Forces. On 7 September 2023, when Kenneth Whitesell retired as the Navy's "Air Boss," Wikoff became acting commander of Naval Air Forces and the Naval Air Force, U.S. Pacific Fleet. His tenure lasted during a hold on his nomination and hundreds of other military nominations in the U.S. Senate by Senator Tommy Tuberville.

Wikoff assumed command of NAVCENT, the Fifth Fleet, and Combined Maritime Forces in Manama, Bahrain, on 1 February 2024 from Brad Cooper. He presided over combat operations for more than a year, mainly against the Houthis in Yemen, amidst Houthi attacks on commercial shipping in the Red Sea. This consisted of U.S. attacks inside Yemen during Operation Poseidon Archer from January 2024 to January 2025, and Operation Rough Rider in the spring of 2025. He was also in command of Navy ships involved in Operation Midnight Hammer during the Twelve-Day War with Iran in June 2025. He relinquished command to Curt Renshaw on 6 October 2025.

Wikoff assumed command of U.S. Naval Forces Europe-Africa and Allied Joint Force Command Naples in Lago Patria, Italy, from Stuart B. Munsch on 19 November 2025.

== Awards and decorations ==

Naval Aviator Badge
Navy Distinguished Service Medal
Defense Superior Service Medal	Legion of Merit with three award stars	Defense Meritorious Service Medal
Air Medal with strike/flight numeral "4" device	Meritorious Service Medal with two award stars	Navy and Marine Corps Commendation Medal with two award stars
Navy Unit Commendation ribbon	Navy and Marine Corps Achievement Medal with award star	Joint Meritorious Unit Award with two oak leaf clusters
Navy Meritorious Unit Commendation	Battle Effectiveness Award 2nd award	National Defense Service Medal with bronze service star
Armed Forces Expeditionary Medal	Southwest Asia Service Medal with bronze service star	Afghanistan Campaign Medal with bronze service star
Global War on Terrorism Expeditionary Medal with three bronze service stars	Armed Forces Service Medal	Global War on Terrorism Service Medal
Navy and Marine Corps Sea Service Deployment Ribbon with bronze service star	Navy and Marine Corps Overseas Service Ribbon with bronze service star	NATO Medal
Command at Sea insignia
Office of the Secretary of Defense Identification Badge
Allied Joint Force Command Naples Badge

== Dates of promotion ==
Rank	Branch	Date
Ensign	Navy	1990
Lieutenant junior grade	Navy	
Lieutenant	Navy	
Lieutenant commander	Navy	24 September 1999
Commander	Navy	29 July 2005
Captain	Navy	30 June 2011
Rear admiral (lower half)	Navy	26 April 2018
Rear admiral	Navy	25 March 2021
Vice admiral	Navy	5 December 2023
Admiral	Navy	19 September 2025

Military offices
Preceded by Sara A. Joyner	Commander of Carrier Air Wing 3; 2013–201?	Succeeded by ???
Preceded by Karl O. Thomas	Commander of Carrier Strike Group 5; 2019–2020	Succeeded by Will Pennington
Preceded by William D. Byrne Jr.	Vice Director of the Joint Staff; 2021–2023	Succeeded by Michael L. Downs
Preceded by Kenneth R. Whitesell	Commander of Naval Air Forces and Naval Air Force, U.S. Pacific Fleet; Acting; 2023–2024	Succeeded by Douglas C. Verissimo
Preceded by Brad Cooper	Commander of the United States Naval Forces Central Command, United States Fifth Fleet, and Combined Maritime Forces; 2024–2025	Succeeded by Curt Renshaw
Preceded by Stuart B. Munsch	Commander of Allied Joint Force Command Naples and United States Naval Forces Europe-Africa; 2025–present	Incumbent
