= Charles W. Moore Jr. =

United States Navy vice admiral

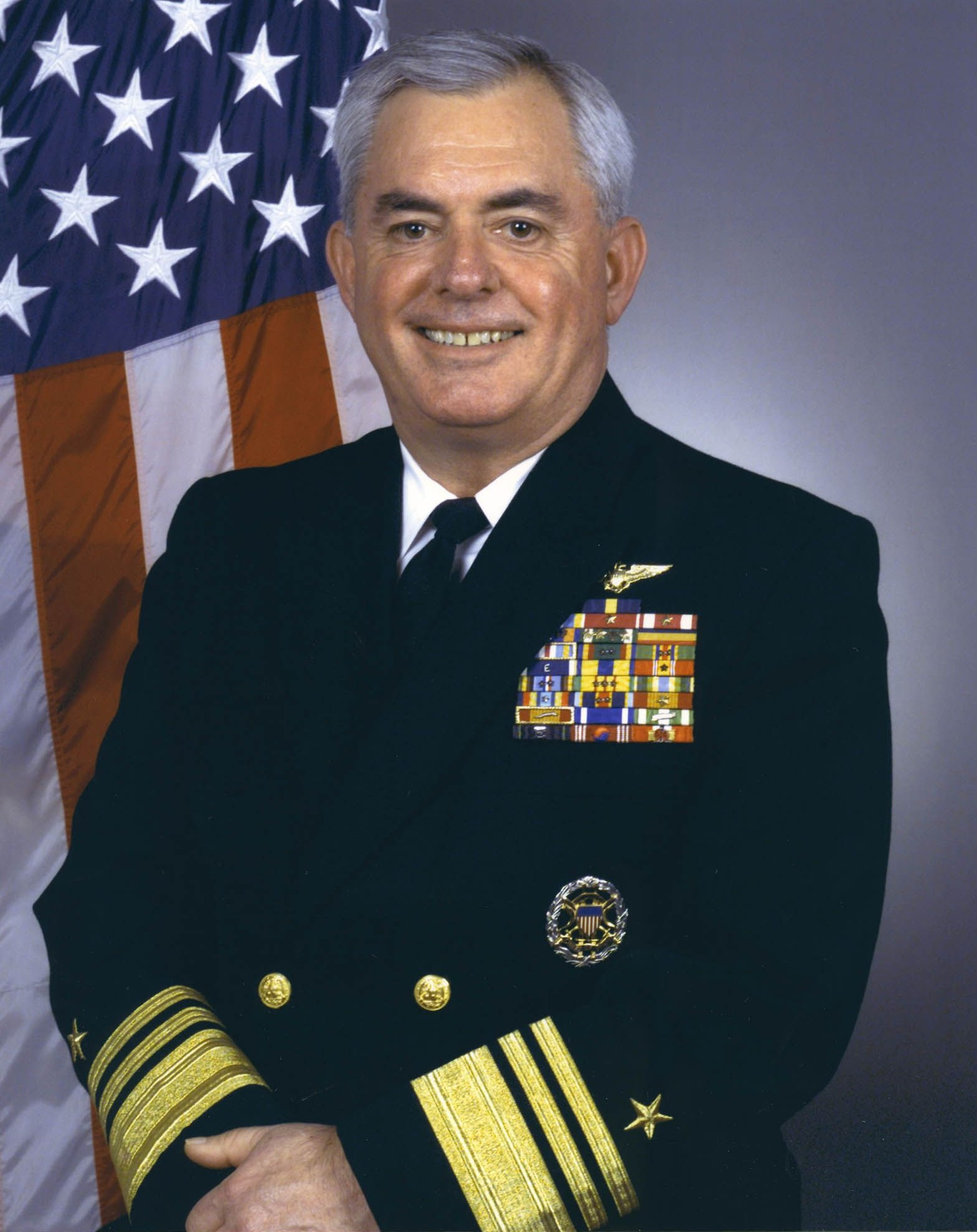
- Moore as acting Superintendent of the United States Naval Academy, 2003
- Born: May 24, 1946 (age 80); Midland, Texas, U.S.
- Military career
- Allegiance: United States
- Branch: United States Navy
- Service years: 1968–2004
- Rank: Vice Admiral
- Commands: Superintendent of the United States Naval Academy (interim); United States Fifth Fleet; Carrier Group Five; Carrier Air Wing Eight; VFA-131
- Conflicts: Vietnam
- Awards: Defense Superior Service Medal; Legion of Merit (2)

Charles William "Willy" Moore Jr. (born May 24, 1946) is a retired vice admiral in the United States Navy. He was an interim Superintendent of the United States Naval Academy in Annapolis, Maryland from June 5, 2003, until Vice Admiral Rodney P. Rempt was appointed superintendent on August 1, 2003. He is a 1968 graduate of the Naval Academy. Moore is also a former Commander of the U.S. Naval Forces, Central Command, commander of the Fifth Fleet in Bahrain, and Deputy Chief of Naval Operations, Fleet Readiness and Logistics. From January 1, 2003, until his retirement on October 1, 2004, he was U.S. naval aviation's Gray Eagle.

In 2004, Moore began to work with Lockheed Martin and in 2009, he was named "Chief Executive-United Arab Emirates for Lockheed Martin Global, Inc."
