= Curt Renshaw =

American admiral (born 1968)

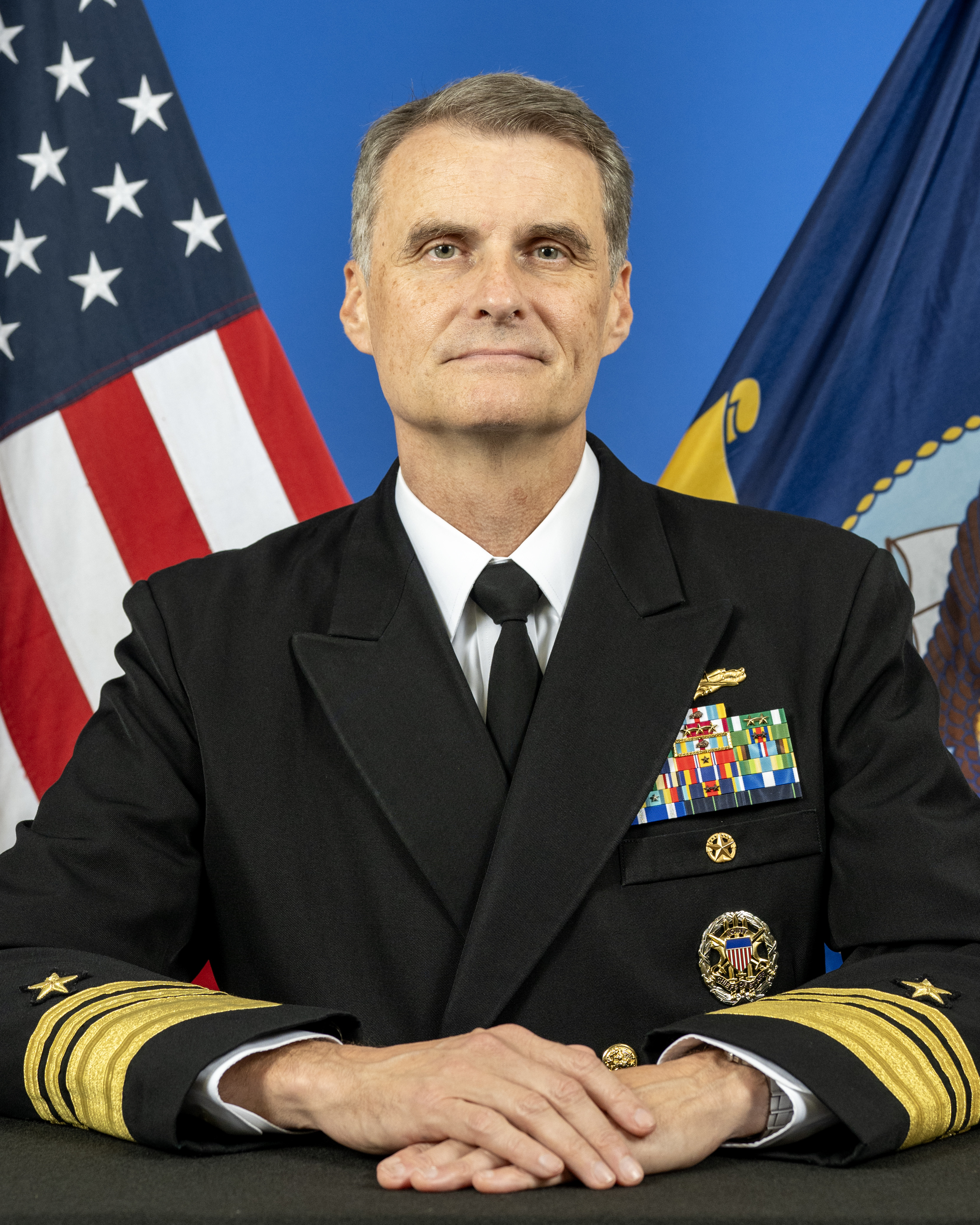
- Official portrait, 2025
- Born: 1968 (age 57–58); New Albany, Indiana, U.S.
- Education: United States Naval Academy (BS); Naval Postgraduate School (MS)
- Military career
- Allegiance: United States
- Branch: United States Navy
- Service years: 1990–present
- Rank: Vice Admiral
- Commands: United States Naval Forces Central Command; United States Fifth Fleet; Carrier Strike Group 8 USS Patriot (MCM 7); USS Independence (LCS-2); USS Chancellorsville (CG 62)
- Conflicts: 2026 Iran war
- Awards: Defense Superior Service Medal; Legion of Merit (2); Navy Meritorious Service Medal (4)

Curt Anthony Renshaw (born 1968) is a United States Navy vice admiral who serves as the commander of the United States Naval Forces Central Command, United States Fifth Fleet, and Combined Maritime Forces since 2025. He previously served as director of operations of the United States Central Command from 2022 to 2025, commander of Carrier Strike Group 8 from 2021 to 2022, and deputy commander of United States Naval Forces Central Command from 2019 to 2021.

== Early life and education ==
Curt Anthony Renshaw was born in 1968 and is a native of New Albany, Indiana. He graduated from the United States Naval Academy in May 1990 with a Bachelor of Science in chemistry. He holds a Master of Science in operations research from the Naval Postgraduate School, earning the Military Operations Research Society Stephen A. Tisdale Graduate Research Award in September 1997 for his thesis An Analytical Model for Evaluating Aegis Missile Defense Effectiveness.

== Naval career ==
Sea tours include Repair Officer and Aegis Fire Control Officer in USS Shiloh (CG 67); Weapons and Combat Systems Officer in USS Anzio (CG 68); and Commanding Officer of USS Patriot (MCM 7); USS Independence (LCS-2); and USS Chancellorsville (CG 62) where he also served as air defense commander for Commander, Task Force Seven Zero.

Ashore, he served as Executive Assistant to the Vice Chief of Naval Operations, Special Assistant to the Assistant Chairman, Joint Chiefs of Staff, Detailer and deputy director, Surface Warfare Officer Assignments in the Bureau of Naval Personnel, and in the Commander, Naval Surface Forces Command staff. He assumed duties as the deputy commander of United States Naval Forces Central Command in June 2019, in Manama, Bahrain. In that role, he was also the deputy commander of the United States Fifth Fleet.

Renshaw commanded Carrier Strike Group 8, based out of Norfolk, Virginia, from August 2021 to May 2022. During his tenure, it became the first U.S. carrier strike group to be placed under NATO command. In March 2022 he was assigned as director of operations of United States Central Command at MacDill Air Force Base, Florida. In June 2025, he was nominated for promotion to vice admiral and assignment as the commander of United States Naval Forces Central Command, United States Fifth Fleet, and Combined Maritime Forces. He took command in October 2025.

During the Iran–United States war that began on 28 February 2026, Renshaw has led the naval engagement against the Iranian Navy.

Renshaw's awards include the Defense Superior Service Medal, Legion of Merit (two awards), Navy Meritorious Service Medal (four awards), Navy Commendation Medal (three awards) and the Navy Achievement Medal (two awards) and other various personal, unit, and service awards.

Military offices
Preceded by Paul J. Schlise	Deputy Commander of the United States Naval Forces Central Command and United States Fifth Fleet; 2019–2021	Succeeded by Sean R. Bailey
Preceded by Ryan B. Scholl	Commander of Carrier Strike Group 8; 2021–2022	Succeeded by Paul Spedero Jr.
Preceded by Alexus Grynkewich	Director of Operations of the United States Central Command; 2022–2025	Succeeded by Curtis R. Bass
Preceded by George Wikoff	Commander of the United States Naval Forces Central Command, United States Fifth Fleet, and Combined Maritime Forces; 2025–present	Incumbent
