= 2021 Special Honours (Australia) =

The Special Honours Lists for Australia are announced by the Sovereign and Governor–General at any time.

Some honours are awarded by other countries where Queen Elizabeth II is the Head of State and Australians receiving those honours are listed here with the relevant reference.

This list also incorporates the Mid Winters Day honours list and the Bravery honours list's.

== Order of Australia ==
Ribbon bar of the Order of Australia (Military)

=== Officer (AO) ===
Honorary Military

- Admiral John C. Aquilino, United States – 27 April 2021 – For distinguished service and dedication to strengthening the military alliance between Australia and the United States.

Honorary General

- Senator Roy Blunt, United States – 9 August 2021 – For distinguished service to Australia's bilateral relationship with the United States of America, in particular to the joint Free Trade Agreement.

=== Member (AM) ===
Honorary General

- Professor Antonella Rirm Natale, Italy – 9 August 2021 – For significant service to Australia's bilateral relationship with Italy, particularly through the promotion of Australian literature internationally, and to cultural exchange programs.

=== Medal (OAM) ===
Honorary General

- David Edwin Crewe, New Zealand – 9 August 2021 – For service to the performing arts, and to the community of Maleny.

== Royal Victorian Order ==
Ribbon bar of the Royal Victorian Order

=== Commander (CVO) ===
- His Excellency the Honourable Paul de Jersey, AC, QC, Governor of Queensland, Australia. Awarded as part of the United Kingdom's 2021 Birthday Honours list.

=== Member (MVO) ===
- Roselyn Eilidh Hamilton, Acting Official Secretary to the Governor of Western Australia. Awarded as part of the United Kingdom's 2021 Birthday Honours list.
- Craig Ernest Kitchen, Official Secretary to the Administrator of the Northern Territory of Australia. Awarded as part of the United Kingdom's 2021 Birthday Honours list.

== Star of Courage (SC) ==
Ribbon bar of the Star of Courage

- Tom Jackson – The late Mr Tom Jackson displayed conspicuous courage during a knife attack at a hostel in Home Hill in Queensland on 23 August 2016.
- Laurie Nolan – Mr Laurie Nolan displayed conspicuous courage during the rescue attempt of a race yacht in treacherous seas off the coast near Port Stephens in New South Wales on 6 January 2016.

== Bravery Medal (BM) ==
Ribbon bar of the Bravery Medal

- Sivei Ah Chong – Mr Sivei Ah Chong displayed considerable bravery following an assault at Minto in New South Wales on 10 September 2016.
- Tom Atkinson – Mr Tom Atkinson displayed considerable bravery during the rescue of a man from a burning vehicle at Wurdiboluc in Victoria on 5 September 2015.
- Andrew Brooker – Mr Andrew Brooker displayed considerable bravery during the rescue of children from a rip at Wollongong Beach in New South Wales on 10 September 2017.
- Scott Burrows – Mr Scott Burrows displayed considerable bravery during the rescue of two people at East Point in Darwin in the Northern Territory on 3 December 2006.
- Luke Chilcott – Mr Luke Chilcott displayed considerable bravery during a confrontation with an armed offender in Wangaratta in Victoria on 25 April 2017.
- Noel Corcoran – Mr Noel Corcoran displayed considerable bravery during the rescue of race yacht crews in treacherous seas off the coast near Port Stephens in New South Wales on 6 January 2016.
- Ian Drummond – Mr Ian Drummond displayed considerable bravery during the rescue attempt of a race yacht crew in treacherous seas off the coast near Port Stephens in New South Wales on 6 January 2016.
- Michael Duggan – Mr Michael Duggan displayed considerable bravery during the rescue of race yacht crews in treacherous seas off the coast near Port Stephens in New South Wales on 6 January 2016.
- Joven Estrada – Mr Joven Estrada displayed considerable bravery during the rescue of a man from a burning vehicle at Malanda in Queensland on 7 March 2019.
- Suzanne Freeman – Ms Suzanne Freeman displayed considerable bravery during the rescue of race yacht crews in treacherous seas off the coast near Port Stephens in New South Wales on 6 January 2016.
- Senior Constable Matthew Gray – Senior Constable Matthew Gray displayed considerable bravery during the rescue of race yacht crews in treacherous seas off the coast near Port Stephens in New South Wales on 6 January 2016.
- William Grey – Mr William Grey displayed considerable bravery when undertaking multiple rescues of people trapped in floodwaters at Stroud in New South Wales on 21 April 2015.
- Dean Hancock – Mr Dean Hancock displayed considerable bravery when undertaking multiple rescues of people trapped in floodwaters at Stroud in New South Wales on 21 April 2015.
- Sergeant Robert Harper – Sergeant Robert Harper displayed considerable bravery during the rescue of six people from a burning building at Belmore in New South Wales on 15 January 2017.
- Sergeant Tony Hogg – Sergeant Tony Hogg displayed considerable bravery during the rescue of race yacht crews in treacherous seas off the coast near Port Stephens in New South Wales on 6 January 2016.
- Jackson Hollmer – Mr Jackson Hollmer displayed considerable bravery during the rescue of a man from a burning vehicle at Wurdiboluc in Victoria on 5 September 2015.
- David Jack – Mr David Jack displayed considerable bravery during the rescue of race yacht crews in treacherous seas off the coast near Port Stephens in New South Wales on 6 January 2016.
- Kenneth Johnson – Mr Kenneth Johnson displayed considerable bravery during the rescue of race yacht crews in treacherous seas off the coast near Port Stephens in New South Wales on 6 January 2016.
- Senior Constable Nicholas Leach – Senior Constable Nicholas Leach displayed considerable bravery during the rescue of race yacht crews in treacherous seas off the coast near Port Stephens in New South Wales on 6 January 2016.
- Ronald Lighton – Mr Ronald Lighton displayed considerable bravery during the rescue attempt of a race yacht crew in treacherous seas off the coast near Port Stephens in New South Wales on 6 January 2016.
- Sergeant David McHenry – Sergeant David McHenry displayed considerable bravery during an encounter with an armed offender in South Melbourne in Victoria on 13 May 2008.
- Senior Constable Adam McKenzie – Senior Constable Adam McKenzie displayed considerable bravery during an encounter with an armed offender in South Melbourne in Victoria on 13 May 2008.
- Benjamin Martin – Mr Benjamin Martin displayed considerable bravery during the rescue of a person from a burning cabin at Port Fairy in Victoria on 21 December 2017.
- Vincent Melbin – Mr Vincent Melbin displayed considerable bravery during the rescue of a man from the Brisbane River in Queensland on 15 March 2019.
- Peter Merlino – Mr Peter Merlino displayed considerable bravery during the rescue of race yacht crews in treacherous seas off the coast near Port Stephens in New South Wales on 6 January 2016.
- Tom Miller – Mr Tom Miller displayed considerable bravery during the rescue attempt of a race yacht in treacherous seas off the coast near Port Stephens in New South Wales on 6 January 2016.
- Senior Constable Trent Moffat – Senior Constable Trent Moffat displayed considerable bravery during the rescue of an elderly couple from floodwaters at Stroud in New South Wales on 21 April 2015.
- Shaun Oliver – The late Mr Shaun Oliver displayed considerable bravery during the rescue of children from a rip at Wollongong Beach in New South Wales on 10 September 2017.
- Sergeant Andrew Parker – Sergeant Andrew Parker displayed considerable bravery during the rescue of race yacht crews in treacherous seas off the coast near Port Stephens in New South Wales on 6 January 2016.
- Thomas Parkinson – Mr Thomas Parkinson displayed considerable bravery during the rescue of children from a rip at Wollongong Beach in New South Wales on 10 September 2017.
- Richard Pizzuto – Mr Richard Pizzuto displayed considerable bravery during the rescue attempt of a race yacht crew in treacherous seas off the coast near Port Stephens in New South Wales on 6 January 2016.
- Khalfan Rashid – Mr Khalfan Rashid displayed considerable bravery following a high speed vehicle accident in central Sydney in New South Wales on 9 September 2017.
- Daniel Richards – Mr Daniel Richards displayed considerable bravery during a knife attack at a hostel in Home Hill in Queensland on 23 August 2016.
- Bill Rathbone – Mr Bill Rathbone displayed considerable bravery when undertaking multiple rescues of people trapped in floodwaters at Stroud in New South Wales on 21 April 2015.
- Dr Stuart Romm – Dr Stuart Romm displayed considerable bravery during the rescue of an elderly man from a burning house at Bellevue Hill in New South Wales on 3 August 2010.
- Sergeant Brad Smith – Sergeant Brad Smith displayed considerable bravery when undertaking multiple rescues of people trapped in floodwaters at Stroud in New South Wales on 21 April 2015.
- Michael Smith – Mr Michael Smith displayed considerable bravery during the rescue attempt of a race yacht crew in treacherous seas off the coast near Port Stephens in New South Wales on 6 January 2016.
- Paul Sullivan – Mr Paul Sullivan displayed considerable bravery during the rescue attempt of a race yacht crew in treacherous seas off the coast near Port Stephens in New South Wales on 6 January 2016.
- Resha Tandan – Miss Resha Tandan displayed considerable bravery after a cliff face incident at the Blue Mountains in New South Wales on 14 January 2019.
- John Eryl Thomas – Mr John Eryl Thomas displayed considerable bravery during the rescue of race yacht crews in treacherous seas off the coast near Port Stephens in New South Wales on 6 January 2016.
- Benjamin van der Burgt – Mr Benjamin van der Burgt displayed considerable bravery during the rescue of a young woman from a cabin fire at Port Fairy in Victoria on 21 December 2017.
- Nigel Waters – Mr Nigel Waters displayed considerable bravery during the rescue of race yacht crews in treacherous seas off the coast near Port Stephens in New South Wales on 6 January 2016.
- Adam Whitehouse – Mr Adam Whitehouse displayed considerable bravery during the rescue of two boys at Tin Can Bay in Queensland on 12 February 2017.
- Senior Constable William Robert Atwood, Queensland Police – Senior Constable William Atwood displayed considerable bravery during the attempted rescue of a man in Bowen, Queensland on 12 December 2015.
- Sergeant Clint William Drew, Queensland Police – Sergeant Clint Drew displayed considerable bravery during the rescue of people from a burning vehicle on Palm Island, Queensland on 27 December 2017.
- Senior Constable Dylan Michael Maestri, Queensland Police – Senior Constable Dylan Maestri displayed considerable bravery during the rescue of people from a burning vehicle on Palm Island, Queensland on 27 December 2017.
- Senior Constable Daniel Peter Murphy, Western Australia Police – Senior Constable Daniel Murphy displayed considerable bravery during the rescue of a person from a burning vehicle in Margaret River, Western Australia on 6 July 2019.
- Senior Constable Kimberley Jayne Murphy, Queensland Police – Senior Constable Kimberley Murphy displayed considerable bravery during the attempted rescue of a man in Bowen, Queensland on 12 December 2015.
- Senior Constable Andrew Christopher Slee, Western Australia Police – Senior Constable Andrew Slee displayed considerable bravery during the rescue of a person from a burning vehicle in Margaret River, Western Australia on 6 July 2019.
- Sergeant Martin Stagg, Australian Army – Sergeant Martin Stagg displayed considerable bravery during the rescue of a person from treacherous surf at Stockton Beach near Newcastle, New South Wales on 26 March 2016.
- Mr Roland Tan – Mr Roland Tan displayed considerable bravery during the rescue of a group of girls from treacherous surf at Glenelg Beach, South Australia on 10 December 2017.
- Mr Anthony Walker – Mr Anthony Walker displayed considerable bravery during the rescue of a man from difficult seas near Broome, Western Australia on 12 November 2018.

== Australian Antarctic Medal (AAM) ==
Ribbon bar of the Australian Antarctic Medal

- Dr Nicholas John Gales – For his outstanding contribution to the Australian Antarctic Program, particularly his leadership in Antarctic and Southern Ocean scientific research by developing a marine mammal program in the Southern Ocean.
- Timothy Price – For his outstanding contribution to the Australian Antarctic Program, particularly in his capacity as a trade supervisor, station leader and expeditioner, ensuring the effective operation of Antarctic Research Station infrastructure and communities.
- Associate Professor Patti Virtue – For her outstanding contribution to the Australian Antarctic Program, particularly in her efforts in mentoring and teaching the next generation of Antarctic ecologists.
- Donna Faye Wightman – For her outstanding contribution to the Australian Antarctic Program, particularly in her capacity as Chef and Deputy Station Leader, especially during the 2015–2016 transition of expeditioners following the grounding of the Aurora Australis.

== Royal Victorian Medal (RVM) ==
Ribbon bar of the Royal Victorian Medal

Silver

- Yvonne Maria Holt, Senior Service Team Member, Government House, Perth, Australia. Awarded as part of the United Kingdom's 2021 New Year Honours list.
- Taisa Okanovic, House Attendant, Government House, Perth, Australia. Awarded as part of the United Kingdom's 2021 Birthday Honours list.

== Commendation for Brave Conduct ==
Ribbon bar of the Commendation for Brave Conduct

- Derek Ah Chong – Mr Derek Ah Chong is commended for brave conduct for his actions following an assault at Minto in New South Wales on 10 September 2016.
- Pearl Ah Chong – Mrs Pearl Ah Chong is commended for brave conduct for her actions following an assault at Minto in New South Wales on 10 September 2016.
- Matthew Airey – Mr Matthew Airey is commended for brave conduct for his actions following a high speed vehicle accident in central Sydney in New South Wales on 9 September 2017.
- Senior Constable Abraham Baidengan – Senior Constable Abraham Baidengan is commended for brave conduct for actions during the rescue of six people from a burning building at Belmore in New South Wales on 15 January 2017.
- Senior Constable Matthew Bassford – Senior Constable Matthew Bassford is commended for brave conduct for his actions following a high speed vehicle accident in central Sydney in New South Wales on 9 September 2017.
- Nathan Beasy – Mr Nathan Beasy is commended for brave conduct for his actions following a vehicle accident and fire at Jancourt East in Victoria on 26 August 2015.
- Paul Brennan – Mr Paul Brennan is commended for brave conduct for his actions during a domestic violence incident in Townsville, Queensland on 5 December 2016.
- Sergeant Blair Brown – Sergeant Blair Brown is commended for brave conduct for his actions during an incident with a distressed man at a police station in Frankston in Melbourne on 8 December 2016.
- Leanne Chamberlain – Mrs Leanne Chamberlain is commended for brave conduct for her actions during a roof collapse at a hospital in Lismore in New South Wales on 28 November 2015.
- Chief Inspector Brenton Charlton – Chief Inspector Brenton Charlton is commended for brave conduct for his actions during the rescue of people from a house fire at Tempe in New South Wales on 30 August 2017.
- Senior Constable Andrew Couch – Senior Constable Andrew Couch is commended for brave conduct for his actions during the rescue of six people from a burning building at Belmore in New South Wales on 15 January 2017.
- Matthew Eddison – Mr Matthew Eddison is commended for brave conduct for his actions in rescuing a person from floodwaters at Murphy's Creek in Queensland on 10 January 2011.
- Garry Finlayson – Mr Garry Finlayson is commended for brave conduct for his actions following a vehicle accident and fire at Jancourt East in Victoria on 26 August 2015.
- Stephan Fourie – Mr Stephan Fourie is commended for brave conduct for his actions during the rescue of a person from a burning cabin at Port Fairy in Victoria on 21 December 2017.
- Christopher Gaffaney – Mr Christopher Gaffaney is commended for brave conduct for his actions during the rescue of people from a house fire at Tempe in New South Wales on 30 August 2017.
- Constable Henry Grant – The late Mr (then Police Constable) Henry Grant is commended for brave conduct for his actions during the rescue of a man from a well in Temora in New South Wales on 3 May 1921.
- Ian Hoddinott – Mr Ian Hoddinott is commended for brave conduct for his actions in rescuing a person from floodwaters at Murphy's Creek in Queensland on 10 January 2011.
- Mary-Ann Hyde – Mrs Mary-Ann Hyde is commended for brave conduct for her actions during a roof collapse at a hospital in Lismore in New South Wales on 28 November 2015.
- Constable Cecelia Jarvis – Constable Cecelia Jarvis is commended for brave conduct for her actions during an incident with a distressed person at Eimeo in Queensland on 23 February 2019.
- Nicholas Karagiannis – Mr Nicholas Karagiannis is commended for brave conduct for his actions during the rescue of people from a house fire at Homebush in New South Wales on 9 November 2014.
- Lachlan Kirwan – Mr Lachlan Kirwan is commended for brave conduct for his actions during the rescue of people from a house fire at Tempe in New South Wales on 30 August 2017.
- Constable Caitlin Langerak – Constable Caitlin Langerak is commended for brave conduct for her actions following a high speed vehicle accident in central Sydney in New South Wales on 9 September 2017.
- Sergeant Michael McClafferty – Sergeant Michael McClafferty is commended for brave conduct for his actions during the rescue of people from a house fire at Chipping Norton in New South Wales on 15 July 2018.
- Senior Constable Todd Mackay – Senior Constable Todd Mackay is commended for brave conduct for his actions during the rescue of six people from a burning building at Belmore in New South Wales on 15 January 2017.
- Michael Maytom – Mr Michael Maytom is commended for brave conduct for his actions when assisting people trapped in floodwaters at Stroud in New South Wales on 21 April 2015.
- Constable Cameron Meani – Constable Cameron Meani is commended for brave conduct for his actions during the rescue of people from a house fire at Chipping Norton in New South Wales on 15 July 2018.
- Demi Mounsey – Ms Demi Mounsey is commended for brave conduct for her actions following a vehicle accident and fire at Jancourt East in Victoria on 26 August 2015.
- Senior Constable Brendan O'Flynn – Senior Constable Brendan O'Flynn is commended for brave conduct for his actions during the rescue of six people from a burning building at Belmore in New South Wales on 15 January 2017.
- Senior Constable Hansell Pereira – Senior Constable Hansell Pereira is commended for brave conduct for his actions during the rescue of six people from a burning building at Belmore in New South Wales on 15 January 2017.
- Senior Constable Rhys Pershouse – Senior Constable Rhys Pershouse is commended for brave conduct for his actions during the rescue of six people from a burning building at Belmore in New South Wales on 15 January 2017.
- Sergeant David Raymond, BM – Sergeant David Raymond is commended for brave conduct for his actions at a building fire at Mermaid Beach in Queensland on 28 December 2018.
- Jacob Raymond – Mr Jacob Raymond is commended for brave conduct for his actions at a building fire at Mermaid Beach in Queensland on 28 December 2018.
- Mario Sardelich – Mr Mario Sardelich is commended for brave conduct for his actions during the rescue of people from Manly Dam in New South Wales on 5 December 1978.
- Grant Scholz – Mr Grant Scholz is commended for brave conduct for his actions during a knife attack at a hostel in Home Hill in Queensland on 23 August 2016.
- Luigi Spina – Mr Luigi Spina is commended for brave conduct for his actions during an assault in Southbank in Melbourne on 24 February 2017.
- Senior Constable Matthew Stewart – Senior Constable Matthew Stewart is commended for brave conduct for his actions during the rescue of six people from a burning building at Belmore in New South Wales on 15 January 2017.
- Senior Constable Arun Trevitt – Senior Constable Arun Trevitt is commended for brave conduct for his actions following a high speed vehicle accident in central Sydney in New South Wales on 9 September 2017.
- Stephen Tucker – Mr Stephen Tucker is commended for brave conduct for his actions during the rescue of people from a house fire at Tempe in New South Wales on 30 August 2017.
- Senior Constable Benjamin White – Senior Constable Benjamin White is commended for brave conduct for his actions during the rescue of six people from a burning building at Belmore in New South Wales on 15 January 2017.
- Senior Constable Brent Whiten – Senior Constable Brent Whiten is commended for brave conduct for his actions during the rescue of people from a house fire at Chipping Norton in New South Wales on 15 July 2018.
- Miss Trinity Rose Bennett – Miss Trinity Bennett is commended for brave conduct for her actions following a vehicle accident near Buchan, Victoria on 20 October 2017.
- Senior Constable Benjamin Dallas Brewster, Queensland Police – Senior Constable Benjamin Brewster is commended for brave conduct for his actions during the rescue of a person at Mooloolaba Beach, Queensland on 11 December 2017.
- Senior Constable Jonathan Cartmill, New South Wales Police – Senior Constable Jonathan Cartmill is commended for brave conduct for his actions during the rescue of a man from rough surf at Byron Bay, New South Wales on 11 March 2015.
- Mr Utah Chilcott – Mr Utah Chilcott is commended for brave conduct for his actions during the rescue of a man from a sinking boat off Evans Head, New South Wales on 1 September 2019.
- Senior Constable Ryan Clarke, Western Australia Police – Senior Constable Ryan Clarke is commended for brave conduct for his actions during the rescue of a woman from a bridge in Beckenham, Western Australia on 19 December 2018.
- Mr Robert Shayne Coverley – Mr Robert Coverley is commended for brave conduct for his actions following an explosion at a house in Midvale, Western Australia on 16 June 2019.
- Mr Peter John Crane – Mr Peter Crane is commended for brave conduct for his actions during the rescue of a man from rough surf at Byron Bay, New South Wales on 11 March 2015.
- Senior Constable Ross Cunninghame, Western Australia Police – Senior Constable Ross Cunninghame is commended for brave conduct for his actions during the rescue of a man from difficult seas at Broome, Western Australia on 12 November 2018.
- First Class Constable Dylan Edwards, Western Australia Police – First Class Constable Dylan Edwards is commended for brave conduct for his actions during an incident and house fire in Butler, Western Australia on 7 April 2020.
- Mr Peter Fabrici – Mr Peter Fabrici is commended for brave conduct for his actions during the rescue of a person from a burning vehicle near Margaret River, Western Australia on 1 January 2020.
- Senior Constable Lynden John Ganzer, Western Australia Police – Senior Constable Lynden Ganzer is commended for brave conduct for his actions during the rescue of a man from difficult seas at Broome, Western Australia on 12 November 2018.
- Senior Constable Kylie Rae Gunter, Queensland Police – Senior Constable Kylie Gunter is commended for brave conduct for her actions during an incident with an armed offender in Mackay, Queensland on 30 May 2018.
- Mr John Hilhorst – Mr John Hilhorst is commended for brave conduct for his actions during the rescue of a child from a burning house in Christie Downs, South Australia on 8 April 2011.
- Mr Angus Andrew Laing – Mr Angus Laing is commended for brave conduct for his actions in the rescue of a woman from a burning apartment in Port Melbourne, Victoria on 11 November 2016.
- First Class Constable Daniel Kenneth Lodge, Western Australia Police – First Class Constable Daniel Lodge is commended for brave conduct for his actions during an incident and house fire in Butler, Western Australia on 7 April 2020.
- Detective Senior Constable Liam James McWhinney, Queensland Police – Detective Senior Constable Liam McWhinney is commended for brave conduct for his actions during an incident with an armed offender in Mackay, Queensland on 30 May 2018.
- Mr Peter Anthony Meletopoulo – Mr Peter Meletopoulo is commended for brave conduct for his actions during the rescue of a man from rough surf at Cronulla Beach, New South Wales on 12 October 2019.
- Mr Jack Callum Mohr – Mr Jack Mohr is commended for brave conduct for his actions during the rescue of a woman from rough surf at Peregian Beach, Queensland on 18 February 2018.
- Mr Brandon James Penrose – Mr Brandon Penrose is commended for brave conduct for his actions during an incident in Roxburgh Park, Victoria on 7 March 2019.
- Sergeant Tasman Garrick Place, Queensland Police – Sergeant Tasman Place is commended for brave conduct for his actions during an incident with an armed offender in Mackay, Queensland on 30 May 2018.
- Mr Laurence Charles Sams, , OAM – Mr Laurence Sams is commended for brave conduct for his actions during an assault at a shopping centre in Perth, Western Australia on 7 April 2019.
- Mr Michael David Scanlon – Mr Michael Scanlon is commended for brave conduct for his actions following the rescue of a woman from a house fire in Carine, Western Australia on 11 June 2020.
- Mr Rolf Ronny Seidel – Mr Rolf Seidel is commended for brave conduct for his actions during the rescue of a man from a burning truck near Northam, Western Australia on 11 October 2018.
- Miss Jayla Smith – Miss Jayla Smith is commended for brave conduct for her actions during the rescue of a young child in Swan View, Western Australia on 10 July 2018.
- Mr Don Sotirov – Mr Don Sotirov is commended for brave conduct for his actions following the rescue of a woman from a house fire in Carine, Western Australia on 11 June 2020.
- The late Mr Raymond Alfred St Julian - Mr Raymond St Julian is commended for brave conduct for his actions during an altercation with an armed offender at Blacktown District Hospital, New South Wales on 27 August 2018.
- Mr Christopher Sykes – Mr Christopher Sykes is commended for brave conduct for his actions during the rescue of a woman from a burning house in Abbotsford, Victoria on 27 January 2019.
- Mr Clayton Allen Thomas – Mr Clayton Thomas is commended for brave conduct for his actions during an incident with an out of control car near Prospect, New South Wales on 28 November 2016.
- Mr Alexander Watkiss – Mr Alexander Watkiss is commended for brave conduct for his actions during the rescue of a man from rough surf at Byron Bay, New South Wales on 11 March 2015.
- Senior Constable Scott Steuart Wilson, Queensland Police – Senior Constable Scott Wilson is commended for brave conduct for his actions during an incident with an armed offender in Mackay, Queensland on 30 May 2018.
- Mr Craig Zulian – Mr Craig Zulian is commended for brave conduct for his actions during the rescue of a teenage surfer swept out to sea at North Wollongong, New South Wales on 30 January 2015.

== Group Bravery Citation ==
The recipients are recognised with the award of the Group Bravery Citation for their actions during an incident with a man at Coombabah in Queensland on 7 December 1999.

- Senior Sergeant Desmond James Hearn, Queensland Police
- Sergeant David Christopher Ives, Queensland Police
- Major Gregory Mark Newman, Australian Army
- Detective Senior Sergeant Adrian Vincent Sala, Queensland Police
- Senior Constable Karen Joyce Wakefield, Queensland Police
- Sergeant Matthew Wakerley, Queensland Police
- Sergeant Lyle Anthony Wiss, Queensland Police

The recipients are recognised with the award of the Group Bravery Citation for their actions following a multiple vehicle collision and fire at Strathpine in Queensland on 31 December 2018.

- James Peter Dale, QLD
- Anthony George Lewis, QLD

The recipients are recognised with the award of the Group Bravery Citation for their actions following an assault at Minto in New South Wales on 10 September 2016.

- Derek AH Chong, NSW
- Pearl AH Chong, NSW
- Sivei AH Chong, NSW
- The late Allice Uiga Ah Fa, NSW
- David Moli Jr, NSW

The recipients are recognised with the award of the Group Bravery Citation for their actions during the pursuit of an armed offender at Liverpool in New South Wales on 29 May 2019.

- Tevita Fakalata Mahe, NSW
- Mathew Saba, NSW
- Sam Saraya, NSW

The recipients are recognised with the award of the Group Bravery Citation for their actions during the rescue of people from crocodile infested waters at Innisfail in Queensland on 2 March 2018.

- Scott Anthony Johnson, QLD
- Edward Gerard Posar, QLD
- Shane Antun Radanovic, QLD

The recipients are recognised with the award of the Group Bravery Citation for their actions during the rescue of two people at East Point in Darwin, Northern Territory on 3 December 2006.

- Scott Douglas Burrows, NT
- Manny Koulakis, NT
- Peter Stacey Simon NT

The recipients are recognised with the award of the Group Bravery Citation for their actions during the rescue of five people from a dangerous river at Maryborough in Queensland on 25 September 2016.

- Constable Drew Jordan Harold, Queensland Police
- Bruce John Holla, QLD
- Craig Brendan McPhillips, QLD

The recipient are recognised with the award of the Group Bravery Citation for their actions following a collision between two boats on Sydney Harbour, New South Wales on 1 May 2008.

- Mr Ahmad Awik, NSW

The recipients are recognised with the award of the Group Bravery Citation for their actions during the rescue of a man from a sinking boat off Evans Head, New South Wales on 1 September 2019.

- Mr Utah Chilcott, NSW
- Mr George Daley, NSW
- Mr Lachlan Metcalf, NSW
- Mr Hayden Sauer, NSW
- Mr Luke Sauer, NSW
- Mr Shaun Sauer, NSW

The recipients are recognised with the award of the Group Bravery Citation for their actions during the rescue of a man from difficult seas at Broome, Western Australia on 12 November 2018.

- Senior Constable Ross Cunninghame, Western Australia Police
- Senior Constable Lynden John Ganzer, Western Australia Police
- Senior Constable Steven Nelson Mayger, Western Australia Police
- Mr Anthony Walker, NSW
