= Stuart B. Munsch =

U.S. Navy admiral

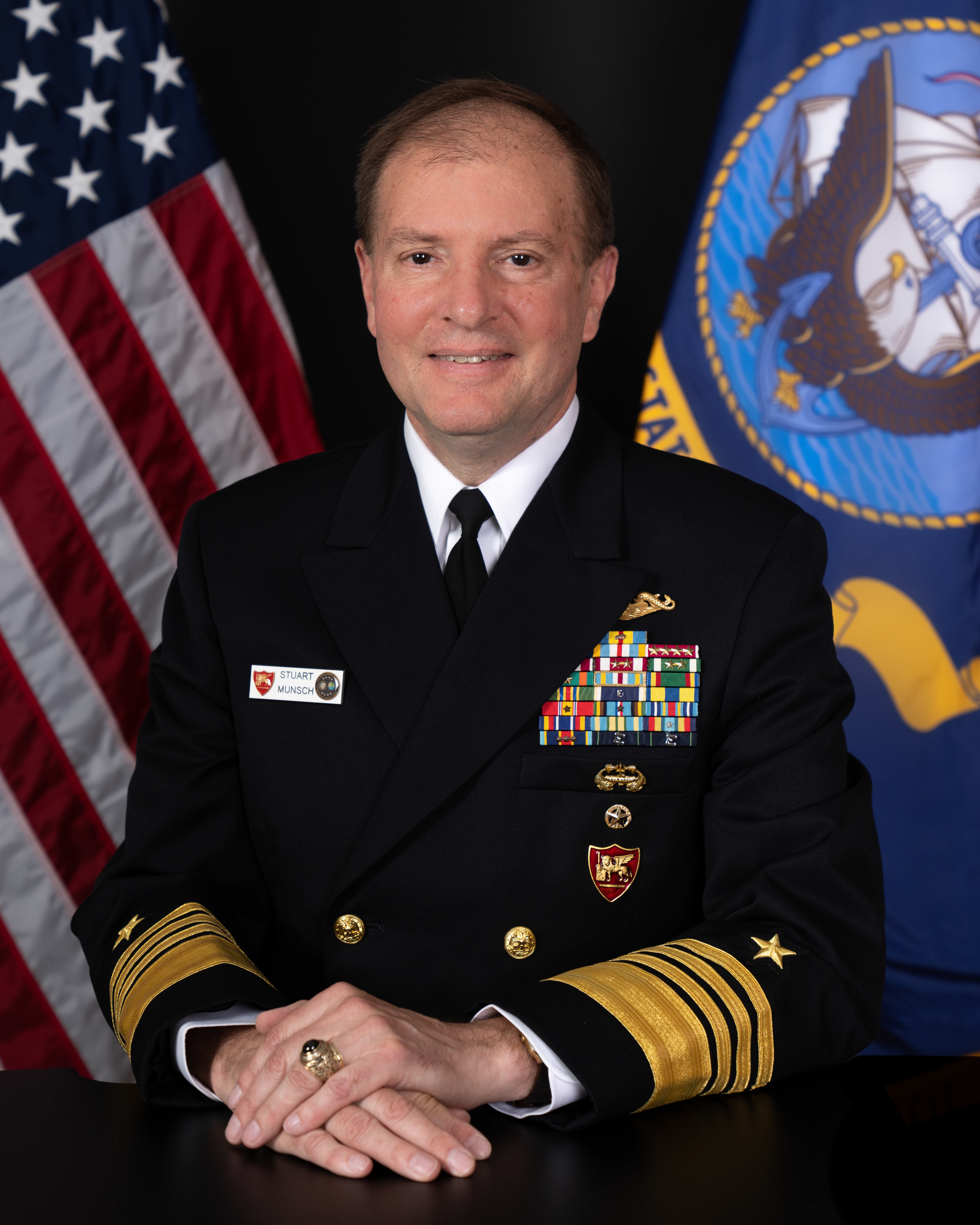
- Born: 1962 (age 63–64)
- Alma mater: United States Naval Academy (BS); University of Oxford (BA, MA)
- Military career
- Allegiance: United States
- Branch: United States Navy
- Service years: 1985–2025
- Rank: Admiral
- Commands: United States Naval Forces Europe-Africa; Allied Joint Force Command Naples; Submarine Development Squadron 5; Submarine Group 7; USS Albuquerque
- Awards: Defense Distinguished Service Medal (2); Navy Distinguished Service Medal; Defense Superior Service Medal; Legion of Merit (5)
- Stuart B. Munsch's voice Munsch's opening statement at a House Armed Services Military Personnel Subcommittee hearing on the 2022 National Defense Strategy; Recorded May 18, 2022

Stuart Benjamin Munsch (born 1962) is a retired United States Navy admiral who last served as the commander of United States Naval Forces Europe-Africa and commander of Allied Joint Force Command Naples from 27 June 2022 to 18 November 2025. Prior to that, he served as the director for joint force development, J7, of the Joint Staff from 2020 to 2022.

Munsch is also the Navy's Old Goat, the longest serving United States Naval Academy graduate on active duty, having received the title and accompanying decanter from John C. Aquilino on 26 June 2024.

== Early life and education ==
Munsch, a native of Oakes, North Dakota, graduated from the Naval Academy in 1985 with a Bachelor of Science in electrical engineering. At the United States Naval Academy, he was brigade commander of the Class of 1985 and was an All-American and national champion pistol shooter. Selected for a Rhodes Scholarship, he attended Oxford University and earned a Bachelor of Arts and a Master of Arts in philosophy, politics and economics.

== Naval career ==
Munsch was assigned to four consecutive sea duty assignments, serving on USS Will Rogers (SSBN-659), USS Jefferson City (SSN-759), USS Kitty Hawk (CV-63) on the staff of commander, Cruiser Destroyer Group 5, and USS Tucson (SSN-770). In 1999, Munsch reported ashore to U.S. Pacific Command, where he served in the Plans and Policy Directorate (J5) prior to becoming deputy executive assistant to the commander. He then was selected for a White House Fellowship and served as special assistant to the Secretary of Agriculture.

Munsch commanded USS Albuquerque (SSN-706) from 2002 to 2005, followed by duty in the Pentagon as the military assistant to the Deputy Secretary of Defense and then as executive assistant to the director, submarine warfare, Office of the Chief of Naval Operations (OPNAV N87).

Munsch commanded Submarine Development Squadron (DEVRON) 5 from 2008 to 2010 and then returned to the Pentagon to head the Navy Strategy branch (OPNAV N513). Selected for flag rank, he was reassigned as deputy director, undersea warfare (OPNAV N97).

Sent overseas to Japan and Bahrain, Munsch commanded Submarine Group 7 and Task Forces 74 and 54 from 2013 to 2015, followed by duty in the Pentagon as the senior military assistant to the Deputy Secretary of Defense. In 2017 Munsch reported to OPNAV N3/N5 as the assistant and in 2018 became the deputy chief of naval operations for operations, plans and strategy. In 2019 he established and served as the initial deputy chief of naval operations for warfighting development, N7. He assumed his role as director for joint force development (J7) in 2020.

== Awards and decorations ==

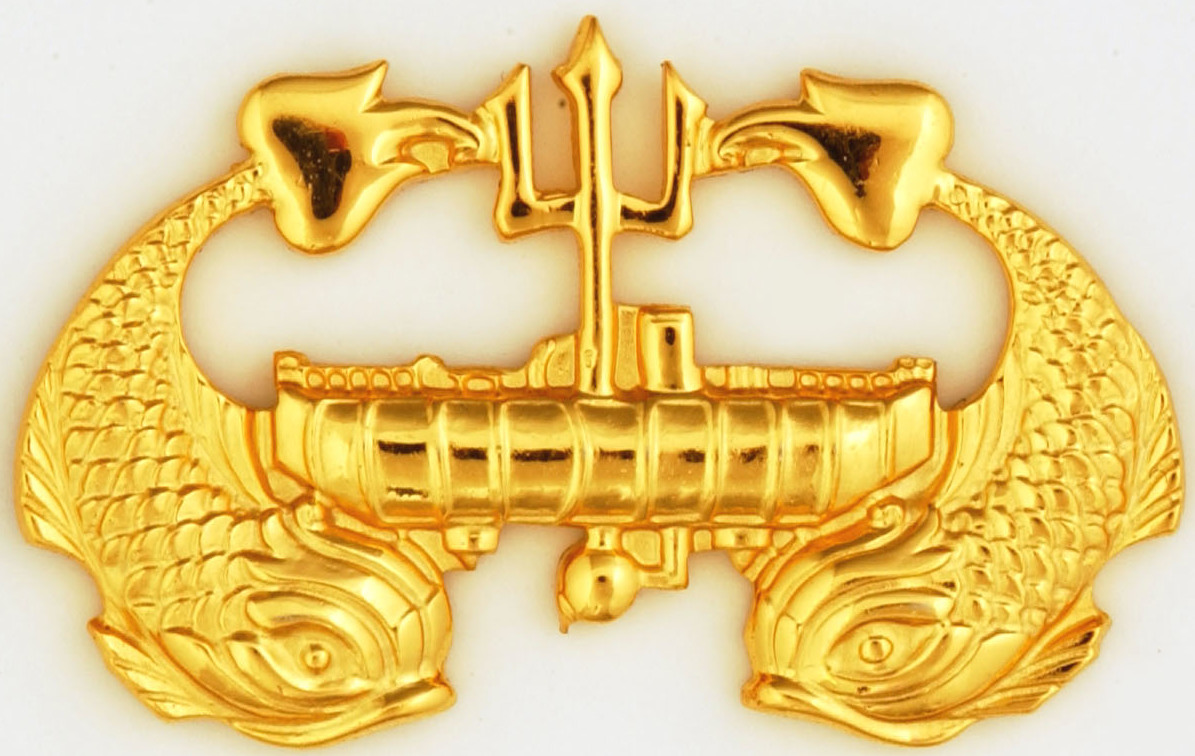

Submarine Warfare Officer Insignia
Defense Distinguished Service Medal with one bronze oak leaf cluster
Navy Distinguished Service Medal	Defense Superior Service Medal	Legion of Merit with four gold award stars
Defense Meritorious Service Medal	Meritorious Service Medal with two award stars	Navy and Marine Corps Commendation Medal with two award stars
Navy and Marine Corps Achievement Medal with award star	Joint Meritorious Unit Award	Navy Unit Commendation
Navy Meritorious Unit Commendation	Navy "E" Ribbon, 1st award	Navy Expeditionary Medal
National Defense Service Medal with one bronze service star	Armed Forces Expeditionary Medal with bronze service star	Global War on Terrorism Expeditionary Medal
Global War on Terrorism Service Medal	Military Outstanding Volunteer Service Medal	Navy Sea Service Deployment Ribbon with silver service star
Navy and Marine Corps Overseas Service Ribbon with three bronze service stars	Navy Expert Rifleman Medal	Navy Expert Pistol Shot Medal
Deep Submergence Insignia in gold
Command at Sea insignia
Allied Joint Force Command Naples Badge

Military offices
Preceded by Eric M. Smith	Senior Military Assistant to the Deputy Secretary of Defense; 2015–2017	Succeeded by Matthew McFarlane
Preceded by James J. Malloy	Deputy Chief of Operations, Plans and Strategy of the United States Navy; 2018-2019	Succeeded by Phillip G. Sawyer
New office	Deputy Chief of Naval Operations for Warfighting Development of the United States Navy; 2019–2020	Succeeded by Lisa Franchetti
Preceded by Daniel J. O'Donohue	Director for Joint Force Development of the Joint Staff; 2020–2022	Succeeded by Dagvin Anderson
Preceded by Robert P. Burke	Commander of Allied Joint Force Command Naples and United States Naval Forces Europe-Africa; 2022–2025	Succeeded by George Wikoff
