= Scott H. Swift =

American Admiral

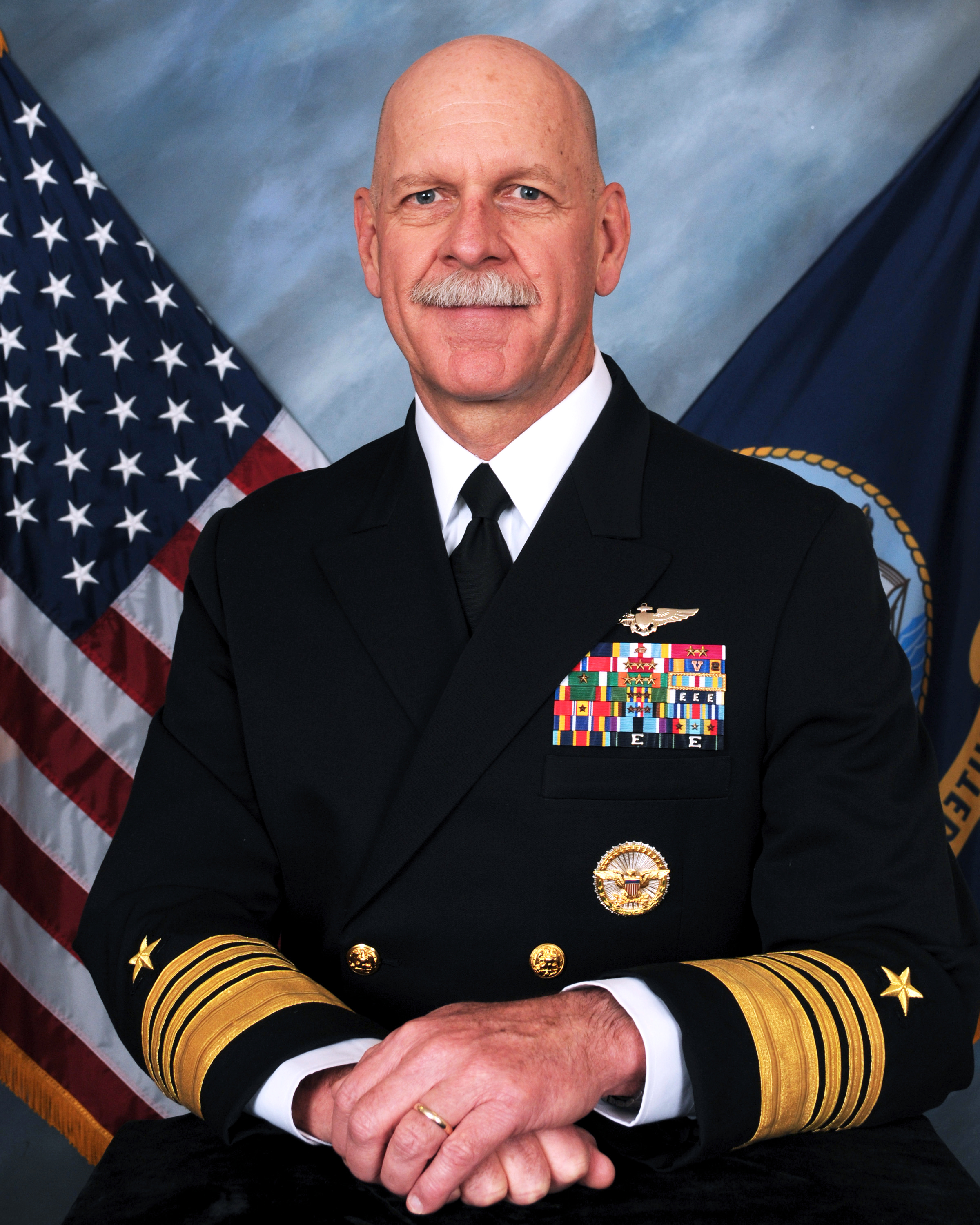
- Admiral Scott H. Swift in May 2015
- Born: December 1, 1957 (age 68); Honolulu, Territory of Hawaii, U.S.
- Alma mater: San Diego State University; Naval War College (MA)
- Military career
- Allegiance: United States
- Branch: United States Navy
- Service years: 1979 – 2018
- Rank: Admiral
- Nickname: Notso
- Commands: United States Pacific Fleet; Director of Navy Staff; United States Seventh Fleet; Deputy Commander, Naval Forces; U.S. Central Command; Director of Operations U.S. Pacific Command; Carrier Air Wing Fourteen (CVW-14); VFA-97 Warhawks; VFA-122 Flying Eagles
- Conflicts: Operation Praying Mantis; Operation Southern Watch; Operation Enduring Freedom; Operation Iraqi Freedom
- Awards: Navy Distinguished Service Medal (3); Defense Superior Service Medal (2); Legion of Merit (3); Bronze Star Medal

Scott Harbison Swift (born December 1, 1957) is a retired admiral in the United States Navy, serving as the commander of the U.S. Pacific Fleet from May 27, 2015 to May 17, 2018. He previously served as the director of Navy Staff in the office of the Chief of Naval Operations.

== Naval career ==
Swift attended San Diego State University and received his commission in 1979 through the Aviation Reserve Officer Candidate (AVROC) program. He received his master's degree from the Naval War College in Newport, Rhode Island.

His operational assignments included Attack Squadron 94 (VA-94); Attack Squadron 97 (VA-97); Attack Squadron 122 (VA-122); Carrier Air Wing 11 (CVW-11) staff; commanding officer, Strike Fighter Squadron 97 (VFA-97); commanding officer, Strike Fighter Squadron 122 (VFA-122); commander, Carrier Air Wing 14; deputy commander, U.S. Naval Forces Central Command and U.S. 5th Fleet; commander, Carrier Strike Group 9; and commander, U.S. 7th Fleet. During those tours, he participated in combat Operations Praying Mantis, Southern Watch, Enduring Freedom, and Iraqi Freedom. He became director of the Navy Staff in September 2013.

His shore tour assignments included the Naval War College; commanding officer, Strike Fighter Weapons School, Pacific; F/A-18 requirements officer on the OPNAV staff; Office of the Undersecretary of Defense for Acquisition, Technology and Logistics staff; and director of operations, U.S. Pacific Command.

Swift has been recognized as the Naval Air Forces, U.S. Pacific Fleet landing signal officer of the Year, and was presented the Commander Michael G. Hoff Award as the U.S. Pacific Fleet attack aviator of the year.

He was nominated for promotion to admiral on November 20, 2014 to assume the command of the United States Pacific Fleet and was confirmed by the United States Senate on December 11, 2014. He took over from Admiral Harry B. Harris Jr. in a ceremony on May 27, 2015.

In December 2015, Swift warned of a possible South China Sea arms race increase.

On March 1, 2017, Swift received the Gray Eagle Award as the Naval Aviator on continuous active duty in U.S. Navy or Marine Corps who has held that designation for the longest period of time.

During the July 2017 Exercise Talisman Saber, an audience member at Australian National University asked Swift if he would carry out any order from President Donald Trump to launch a nuclear strike on China, to which Swift replied yes.

On September 25, 2017, Swift announced that he would retire after he was notified by then-Chief of Naval Operations, Adm. John Richardson, that Swift would not be nominated to take over leadership of the United States Indo-Pacific Command, the inter-branch theater command for the Pacific region. Swift is among several flag officers to be removed or announce an early retirement following deadly accidents involving Navy vessels USS John S. McCain and USS Fitzgerald in the Pacific Fleet in 2017.

Admiral Swift was relieved by Admiral John C. Aquilino and officially retired from the Navy on May 17, 2018.

== Awards and decorations ==
Naval Aviator insignia
Command at Sea insignia
Office of the Secretary of Defense Identification Badge

Navy Distinguished Service Medal with two gold award stars
Defense Superior Service Medal with bronze oak leaf cluster
Legion of Merit with 2 gold award stars
Bronze Star
Meritorious Service Medal with 3 award stars
Air Medal with Combat V and bronze Strike/Flight numeral "2"
Navy and Marine Corps Commendation Medal with award star
Navy and Marine Corps Achievement Medal with three award stars
Joint Meritorious Unit Award
Navy Unit Commendation
Navy Meritorious Unit Commendation with three service stars
Navy "E" Ribbon with three Battle E devices
National Defense Service Medal with service star
Armed Forces Expeditionary Medal with three service stars
Global War on Terrorism Expeditionary Medal
Global War on Terrorism Service Medal
Humanitarian Service Medal
Navy Sea Service Deployment Ribbon with seven service stars
Navy & Marine Corps Overseas Service Ribbon
Navy Expert Rifleman Medal
Navy Expert Pistol Shot Medal

Military offices
Preceded by Harry B. Harris Jr.	Commander of the United States Pacific Fleet; 2015–2018	Succeeded by John C. Aquilino
