= Old Goat =

United States Navy designation

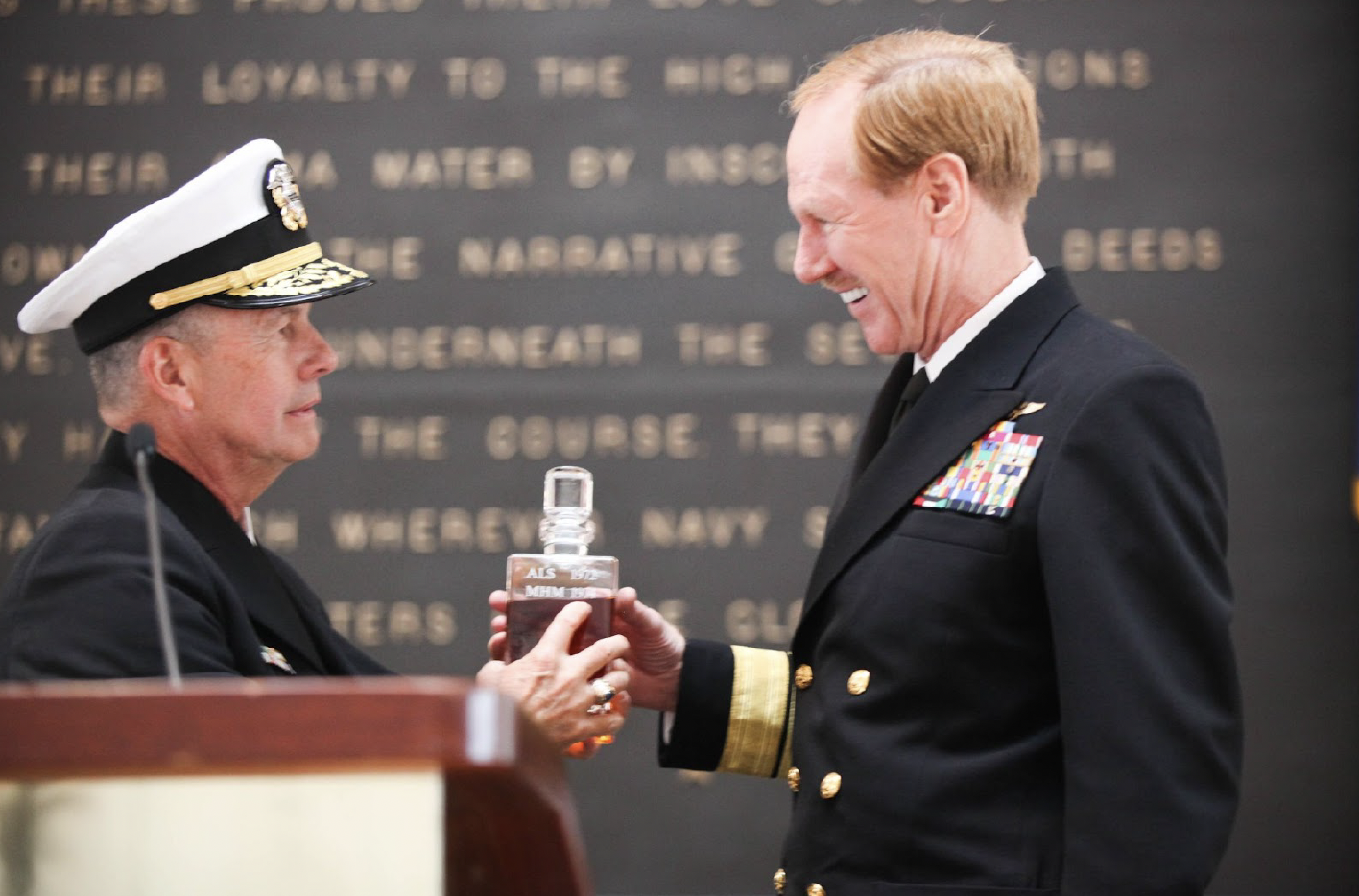
RADM Alton L. Stocks, the original and first “Old Goat,” presented the coveted Old Goat decanter—the award’s traditional trophy—to VADM Michael H. Miller at the United States Memorial Hall.

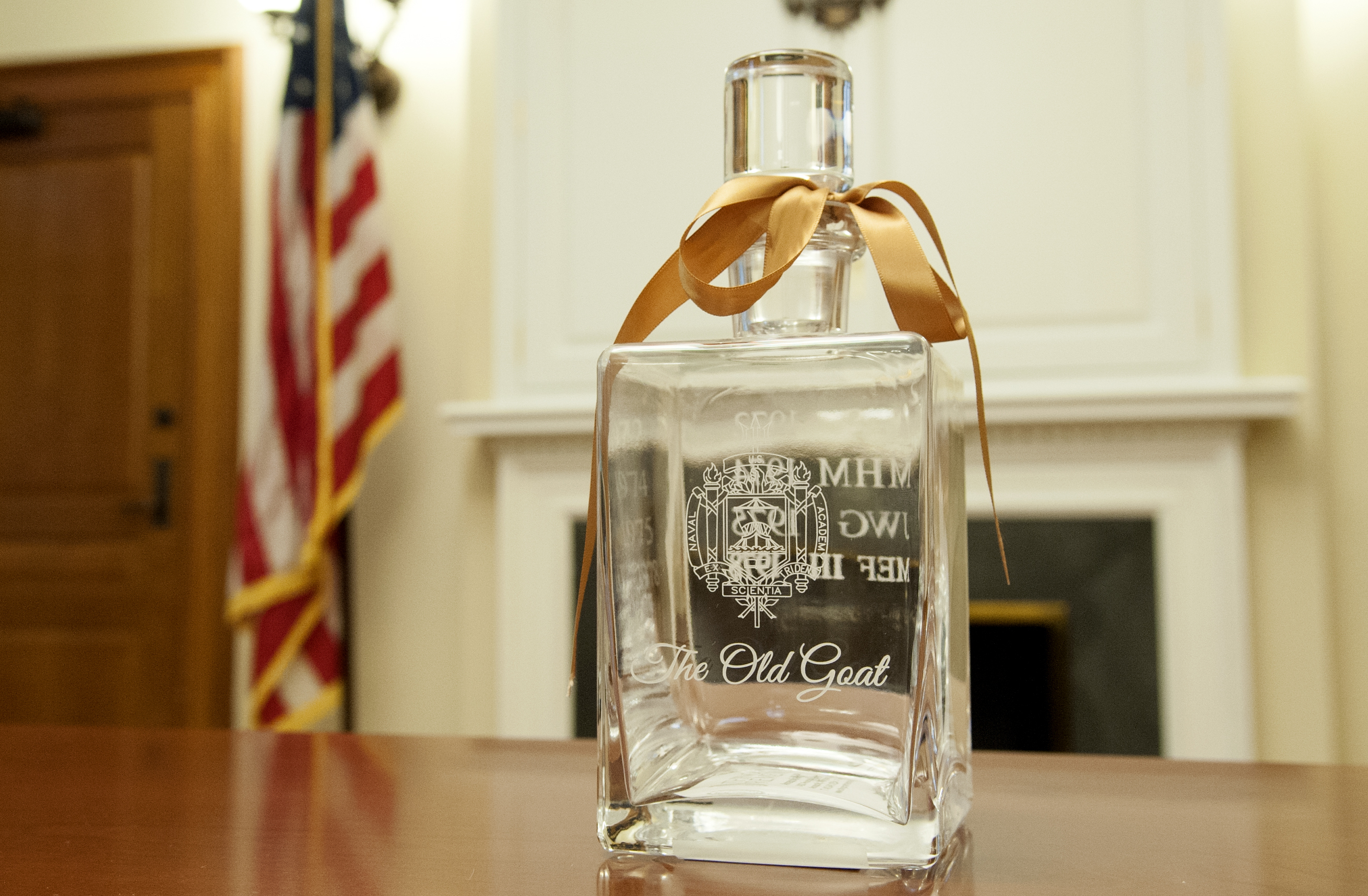
The Old Goat decanter in the possession of Admiral Mark Ferguson, Class of 1978.

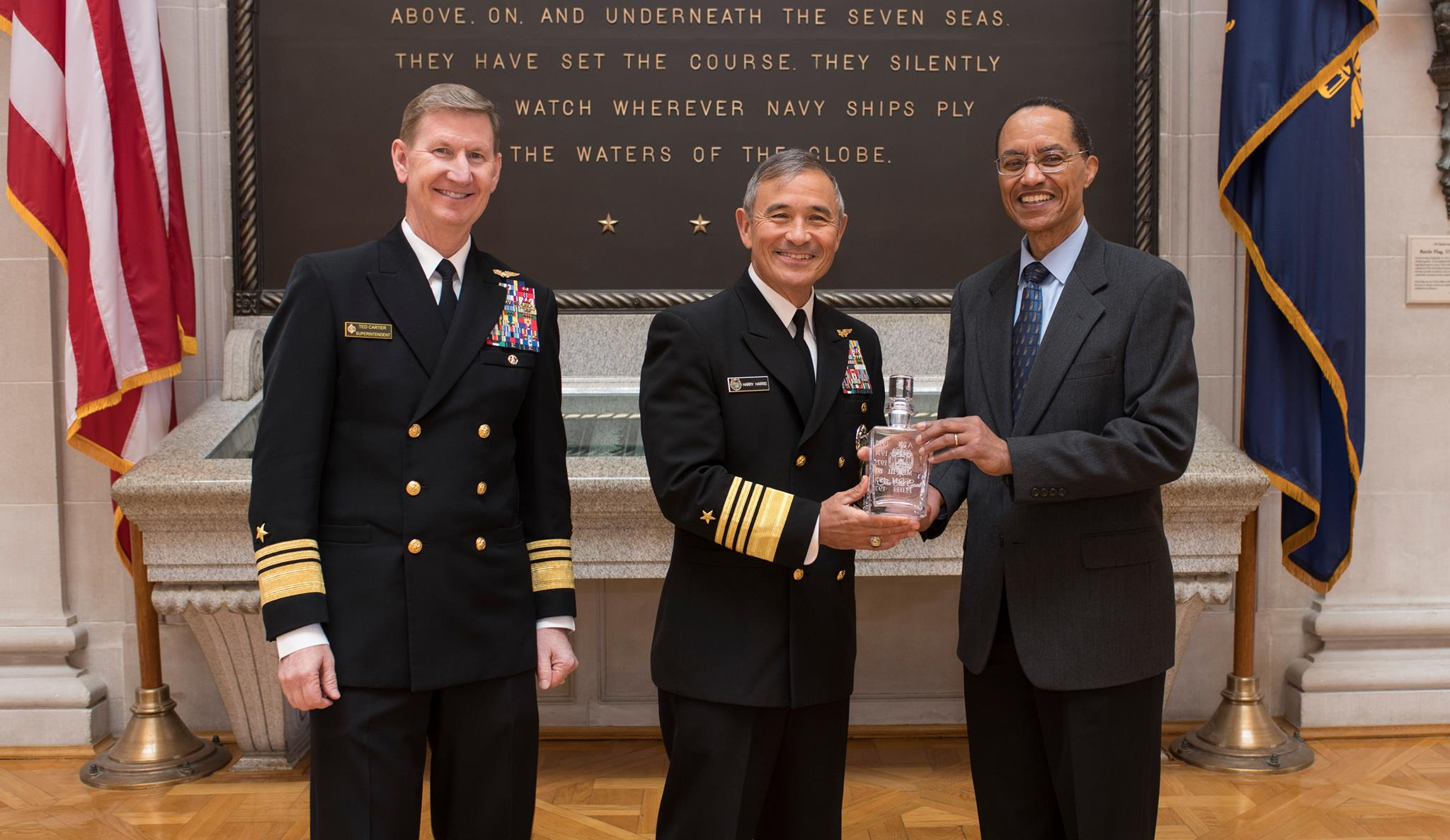
Admiral Harry Harris accepts the Old Goat decanter from retired Admiral Cecil Haney in April 2017.

In United States Naval Academy terminology, the Old Goat is the longest-serving Naval Academy graduate on active duty. Since 2014, the designation has been accompanied by an award created by a previous Old Goat, Rear Admiral Alton L. Stocks. The award – a crystal decanter engraved with the initials and class years of previous holders – is passed to a new Old Goat upon the current holder's retirement. There have been ten Old Goats so awarded, each after more than 35 years' service to the U.S. Navy.

== Award recipients ==
Photo	Recipient	Class	Awarded title	Relinquished title	Last position	Ref.
	Rear Admiral; Alton L. Stocks	1972	N/A	8 March 2014	Deputy Chief, Bureau of Medicine and Surgery	
	Vice Admiral; Michael H. Miller	1974	8 March 2014	1 August 2015	Superintendent, United States Naval Academy	
	Admiral; Jonathan W. Greenert	1975	1 August 2015	18 September 2015	Chief of Naval Operations	
	Admiral; Mark E. Ferguson III	1978	18 September 2015	1 July 2016	Commander, U.S. Naval Forces Europe & U.S. Naval Forces Africa	
	Admiral; Cecil D. Haney	1978	1 July 2016	17 January 2017	Commander, U.S. Strategic Command	
	Admiral; Harry B. Harris Jr.	1978	17 January 2017	11 April 2018	Commander, U.S. Pacific Command	
	Admiral; Kurt W. Tidd	1978	11 April 2018	8 October 2018	Commander, U.S. Southern Command	
	Admiral; William K. Lescher	1980	8 October 2018	30 August 2022	Vice Chief of Naval Operations	
	Admiral; James F. Caldwell Jr.	1981	30 August 2022	10 January 2024	Director, Naval Reactors	
	Admiral; John C. Aquilino	1984	9 January 2024	26 June 2024	Commander, U.S. Indo-Pacific Command	
	Admiral; Stuart B. Munsch	1985	26 June 2024	Incumbent	Commander, U.S. Naval Forces Europe and Africa	

The current Old Goat is Admiral Stuart B. Munsch (USNA ’85), who has served as Commander, United States Naval Forces Europe and Africa since 2022. He received the title and accompanying award from Admiral John C. Aquilino, the outgoing commander of United States Indo-Pacific Command on 26 June 2024.

== Class of 1978 ==
The Naval Academy's Class of 1978 was just the fourth USNA class to produce four full (four-star) admirals; each was recognized as the Old Goat.
