= Harry B. Harris Jr. =

American diplomat and U.S. Navy officer (born 1956)

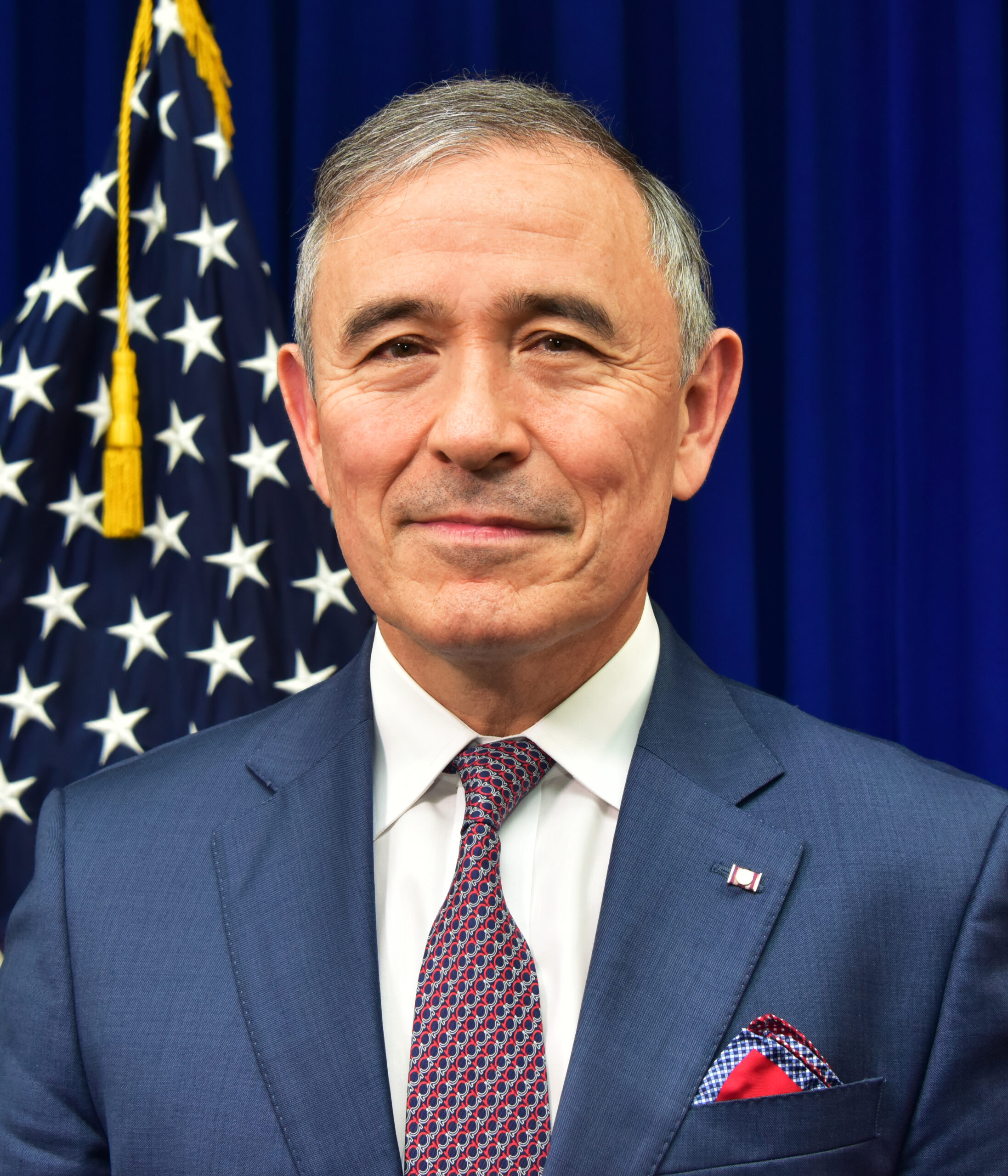

23rd United States Ambassador to South Korea
- In office July 25, 2018 – January 20, 2021
- President: Donald Trump
- Preceded by: Mark Lippert
- Succeeded by: Philip Goldberg

Commander of United States Indo-Pacific Command
- In office May 27, 2015 – May 30, 2018
- President: Barack Obama; Donald Trump
- Preceded by: Samuel J. Locklear
- Succeeded by: Philip S. Davidson

Personal details
- Born: Harry Binkley Harris Jr. August 4, 1956 (age 70) Yokosuka, Kanagawa, Japan
- Education: United States Naval Academy (BS); Harvard University (MPA); Georgetown University (MA)

Military service
- Allegiance: United States
- Branch/service: United States Navy
- Years of service: 1978–2018
- Rank: Admiral
- Commands: United States Pacific Command; United States Pacific Fleet; U.S. Sixth Fleet • Naval Striking and Support Forces NATO; JTF Guantanamo; Patrol and Reconnaissance Wing 1 VP-46
- Battles/wars: Operation Attain Document III; Persian Gulf War • Operation Desert Shield • Operation Desert Storm; Operation Earnest Will; Operation Southern Watch; War in Afghanistan; Iraq War: Operation Iraqi Freedom; Libyan Civil War: Operation Odyssey Dawn
- Awards: Defense Distinguished Service Medal (2); Navy Distinguished Service Medal (3); Defense Superior Service Medal (3); Legion of Merit (3); Bronze Star (2); Meritorious Service Medal (4); Air Medal with bronze Strike/Flight numeral 1 Distinguished Honor Award
- Harry B. Harris's voice Harris's opening statement at a House Armed Services Committee hearing on the Asia-Pacific region Recorded February 24, 2016

Harry Binkley Harris Jr. (Japanese surname: 大野, born August 4, 1956) is an American diplomat and retired United States Navy four-star admiral. He was the first American of Japanese descent to lead US Pacific Command and was the highest-ranking American of Japanese descent in U.S. Navy history during his time as commander.

Born in Japan, he is also the first 4-star admiral to have participated in the Navy Junior Reserve Officers' Training Corps (NJROTC) and the first officer from the U.S. Navy's P-3 Orion maritime patrol aviation community to achieve 4-star rank. While a vice admiral, he served as the Assistant to the Chairman of the Joint Chiefs of Staff. Harris was Commander, U.S. Pacific Fleet in Hawaii from 2013 to 2015. He took command of USPACOM on May 27, 2015, and retired from Naval service on June 1, 2018.

Harris is a 1978 graduate of the United States Naval Academy at Annapolis. He was the U.S. Navy's "Old Goat" – the longest-serving Naval Academy graduate still on active duty – from January 2017 until April 2018, when he passed the title on to his classmate, Admiral Kurt W. Tidd, in a private ceremony at the Pentagon. He was also the Navy's 15th "Gray Owl" – the Naval Flight Officer on active duty who has held this designation the longest period. Harris passed the Gray Owl to Vice Admiral Herman A. Shelanski at the National Naval Aviation Museum's 2018 Naval Aviation Symposium. Governor Rick Perry designated him as an admiral in the Texas Navy on July 18, 2006. He was also designated as a "Colonel Aide de Camp" for the state of Tennessee by Governor Phil Bredesen on August 8, 2007 and a "Kentucky Colonel" by Kentucky Governor Andy Beshear on March 3, 2021.

== Early life and education ==
He was born in Yokosuka, Kanagawa, in 1956. His mother, Fumiko (Ohno), was Japanese and his father, LTJG Harry Binkley Harris, was a U.S. Navy machinist's mate (and later chief petty officer) when he served aboard the USS Lexington (CV-2) during the Battle of the Coral Sea. After his family's move to the United States, Harris grew up in Crossville, Tennessee, and Pensacola, Florida, where he attended local public schools.

== Career ==
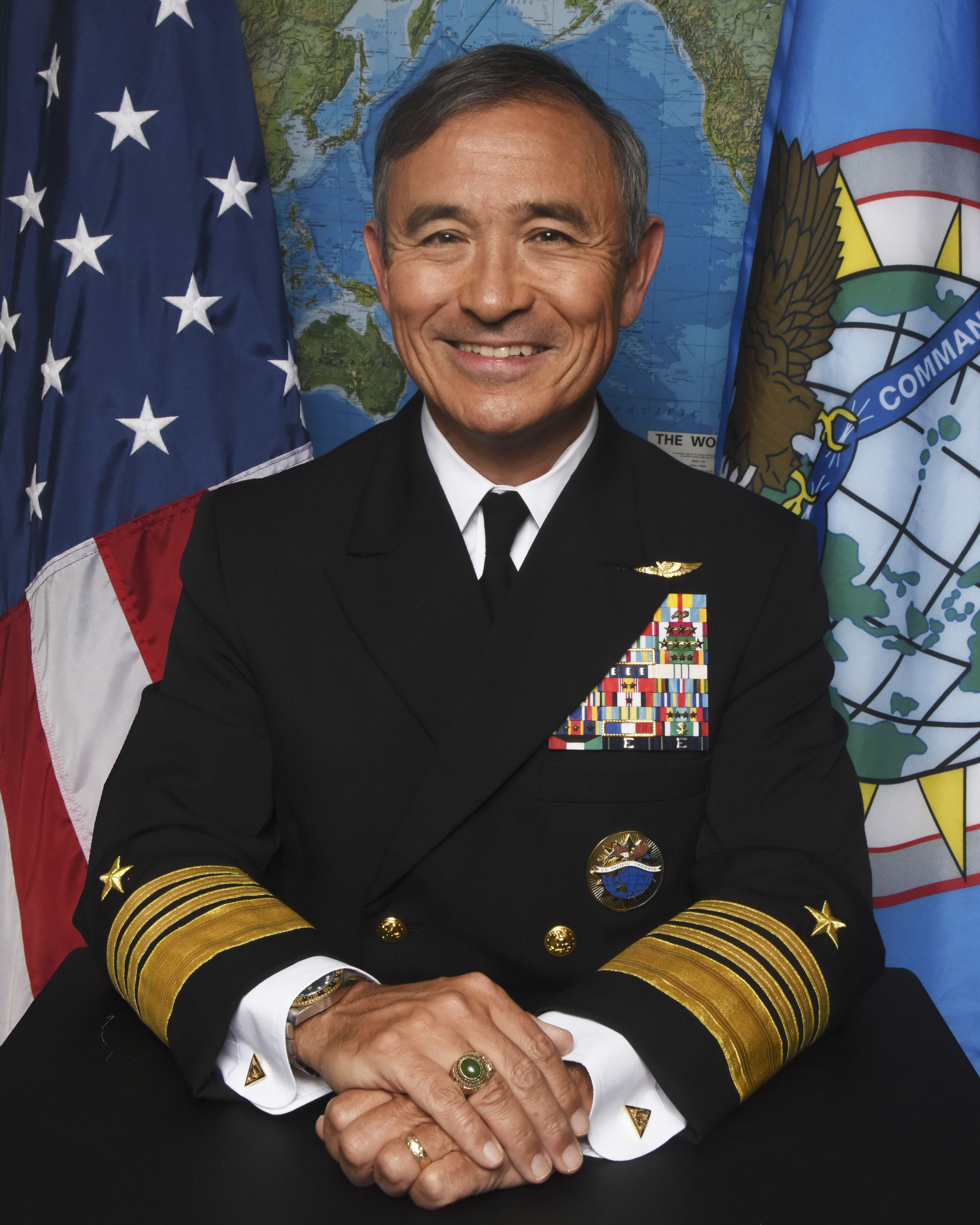
Harris' official military portrait as PACOM commander, c. May 2015.

Harris graduated from the U.S. Naval Academy in 1978. He majored in general engineering and was a varsity fencer.

After flight training, he was designated as a Naval Flight Officer and assigned to Patrol Squadron Forty-Four (VP-44), homeported at Naval Air Station Brunswick, Maine. He flew the P-3C Orion, deploying throughout the Pacific, Indian and Atlantic Oceans, and Mediterranean Sea. His subsequent operational tours include assignment as a tactical action officer on board USS Saratoga, to include participation in dealing with the Achille Lauro hijacking and the 1986 air strikes against Libya (Operation Attain Document III). He served as Operations Officer in Patrol Squadron Four (VP-4) at Naval Air Station Barbers Point, Hawaii, deploying to Southwest Asia during Operations Desert Shield/Desert Storm. He had three tours with Patrol and Reconnaissance Wing 1/Task Force 57/Task Force 72, homeported in Kami Seya, Japan. During his earlier tours with Patrol and Reconnaissance Wing 1, Harris participated in Operations Earnest Will and Southern Watch. In 1999–2000, he attended MIT Seminar XXI.

In 2002, he reported to Commander, U.S. Naval Forces Central Command / U.S. Fifth Fleet in Manama, Bahrain, serving as Assistant Chief of Staff for Operations, Plans, and Pol-Mil Affairs (N3/N5). He was responsible for the planning and execution of the Naval component's portion of Operation Iraqi Freedom, which began on March 19, 2003.

His aviation command assignments include Patrol Squadron Forty-Six (VP-46) at Naval Air Station Whidbey Island, Washington, and Patrol and Reconnaissance Wing 1/CTF 57/CTF 72 at Kami Seya, Japan. Task Force 57, the U.S. 5th Fleet maritime patrol and reconnaissance aircraft force, was heavily involved in Operation Enduring Freedom as squadrons and aircrews under his command flew nearly 1,000 P-3 and EP-3 surveillance and reconnaissance sorties over Afghanistan. Additional Flag Officer command assignments included Joint Task Force Guantanamo in Cuba, U.S. Sixth Fleet / Naval Striking and Support Forces NATO in Italy, and the U.S. Pacific Fleet.

Harris' shore assignments include Aide and Flag Lieutenant to the Commander, U.S. Naval Forces Japan in Yokosuka, Japan; three tours on the staff of the Chief of Naval Operations to include two flag officer tours and a tour as a strategist in the Strategy and Concepts Branch; Chief Speechwriter to the Chairman of the Joint Chiefs of Staff; and Assistant to the Chairman of the Joint Chiefs of Staff. His Flag assignments are described below.

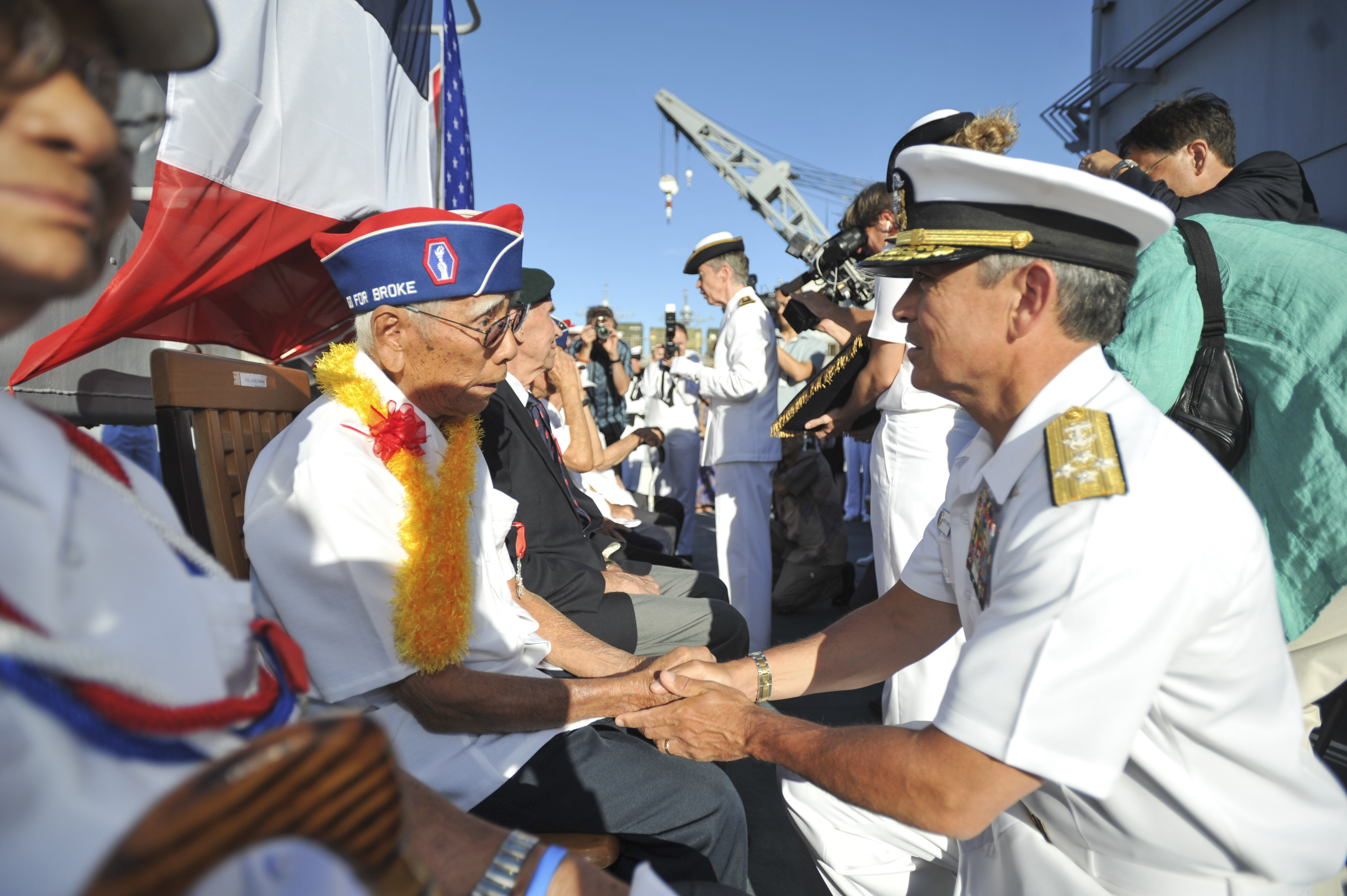
Adm. Harris thanking a 442nd Regimental Combat Team veteran for his contributions in World War II during a 2014 ceremony

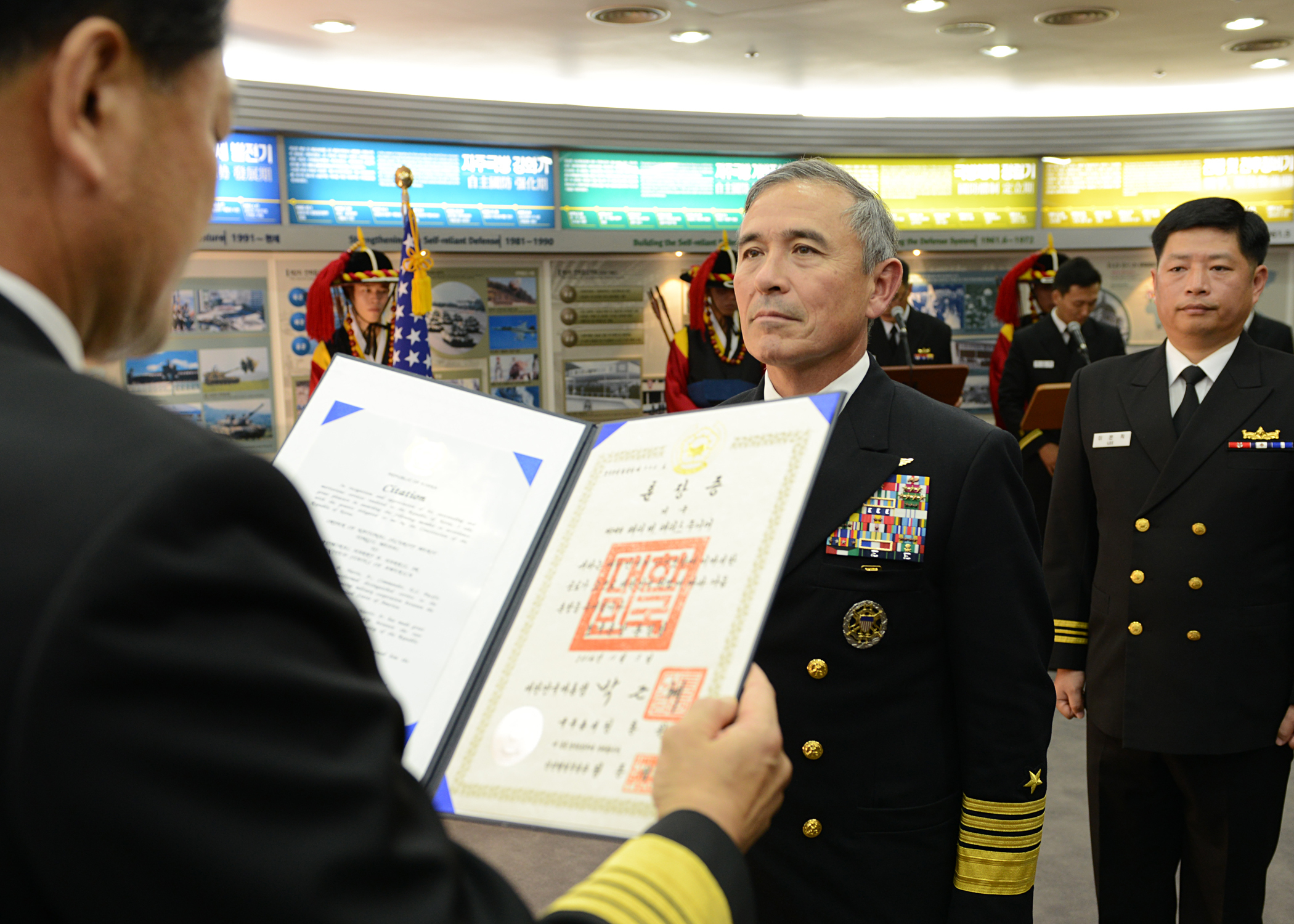
Harris receiving the South Korean Tong-il National Defense Medal in 2014.

His educational assignments include selection for the Navy's Harvard/Tufts Program, where he graduated with a Master's of Public Administration from Harvard's John F. Kennedy School of Government in 1992. Subsequently, selected as an Arthur S. Moreau Scholar, he studied international relations and ethics of war at Oxford and Georgetown University, earning a Master of Arts in National Security Studies from the latter in 1994. While at Georgetown, he was a Fellow in the School of Foreign Service. He was also an MIT Seminar 21 fellow for the 1999–2000 class.

Harris has logged 4400 flight hours – including over 400 combat hours – in U.S. and foreign maritime patrol and reconnaissance aircraft. He is a recipient of the Navy League's Stephen Decatur Award for Operational Competence, the CIA's Agency Seal Medal, and the CIA's Ambassador Award in 2021. For his work in diversity and leadership, he has also received the NECO Ellis Island Medal of Honor, the APAICS Lifetime Achievement Award, the WWAAC Community Spirit Award, and the AAGEN Distinguished Lifetime Achievement Award. In 2017, Harris was named an Honorary Chief Petty Officer by Master Chief Petty Officer of the Navy Steven S. Giordano in recognition of his leadership and "extraordinary dedication to the Navy's core values of honor, courage, and commitment." In 2021, the Institute for Corean-American Studies (ICAS) named him an ICAS Distinguished Fellow; he was recognized by Tufts University with its Dr. Jean Mayer Global Citizenship Award; he was inducted into the Maritime Patrol Association Hall of Honor; and he received the Naval order of the U.S. Distinguished Sea Service Award. The Honolulu Council of the Navy League of the U.S. awarded him its American Patriot Award for 2022. He is a member of the Council on Foreign Relations and the Council of American Ambassadors.

=== Director, Current Operations and Anti-Terrorism/Force Protection Division (OPNAV N31/34) ===
In August 2004, in his first Flag assignment, he reported to the staff of the Chief of Naval Operations, where he was responsible for Navy current operations, the Navy Command Center, and anti-terrorism/force protection policy.

=== Commander, Joint Task Force Guantanamo ===
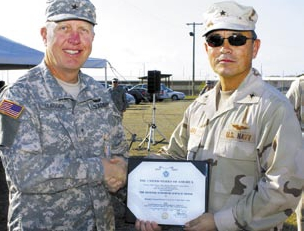
Rear Admiral Harry Harris presents Brigadier General Edward Leacock with the Defense Superior Service Medal, March 2, 2007.

In March 2006, he assumed command of Joint Task Force Guantanamo in Cuba. His service was notable as he was in charge when three prisoners, Mani Shaman Turki al-Habardi Al-Utaybi, Salah Ali Abdullah Ahmed al-Salami and Yasser Talal Al Zahrani, died in the custody of US forces. Defense reported the deaths as suicides. Harris said at the time,

I believe this was not an act of desperation, but an act of asymmetrical warfare waged against us.

Harris ordered a full investigation by the Naval Criminal Investigative Service (NCIS), which published its report in a heavily redacted version in August 2008.

A report, Death in Camp Delta, was published in December 2009 by the Center for Policy & Research of Seton Hall University School of Law, under the supervision of its director, Professor Mark Denbeaux, attorney for two Guantanamo detainees, criticizing numerous inconsistencies in the official accounts of these deaths. The report suggested there had either been gross negligence or an attempt to cover up homicides of the men, perhaps due to torture under interrogation.

On January 18, 2010, Scott Horton of Harper's Magazine published a story suggesting that al-Salami, Al-Utaybi and Al-Zahrani had died as a result of accidental manslaughter during a torture session, and that the official account was a cover-up. Horton had undertaken a joint investigation with NBC News, based on an account by four former guards at Guantanamo Bay detention camp. They suggested that the men had died at a black site, informally called "Camp No," used for interrogation including torture. It was located about a mile outside the regular camp boundaries.

=== Director of Operations, U.S. Southern Command ===
From June 2007 to April 2008, Harris served as director of operations (J3) for U.S. Southern Command in Miami. He led the joint planning effort for Operation Willing Spirit (the rescue of American hostages held hostage in Colombia).

=== Deputy Chief of Naval Operations (OPNAV N6) ===
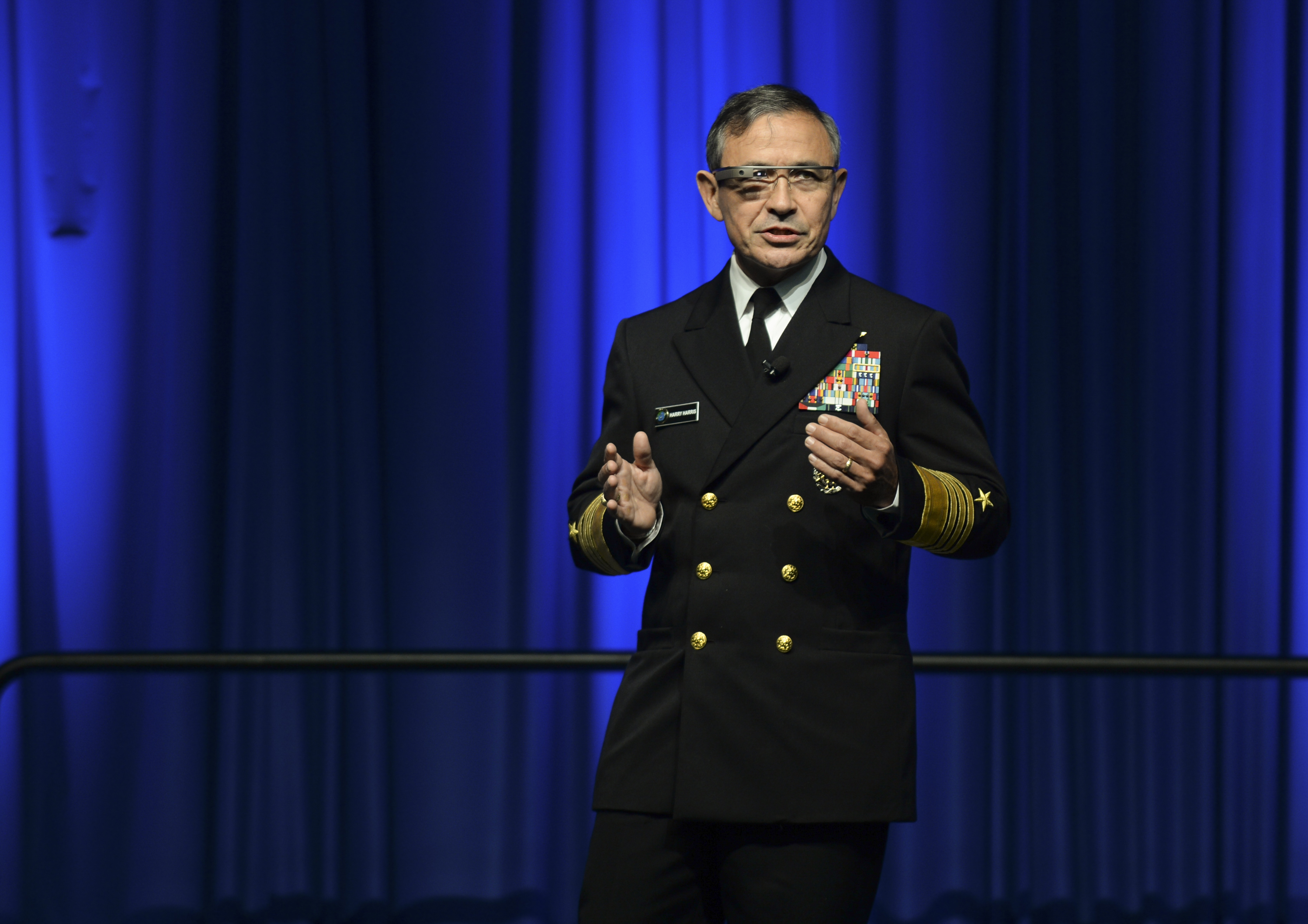
Adm. Harris wearing Google Glass during a presentation at AFCEA West in February 2014.

Harris returned to the Pentagon to serve as the Deputy Chief of Naval Operations for Communication Networks (OPNAV N6) and the Deputy Department of the Navy Chief Information Officer (Navy) until November 2009. He was responsible for early resource sponsor decisions for the Consolidated Afloat Networks and Enterprise Services (CANES), Next Generation Enterprise Network (NGEN), Mobile User Objective System (MUOS) and Maritime Domain Awareness (MDA).

=== Commander, U.S. Sixth Fleet ===
In November 2009, Harris assumed command of the U.S. 6th Fleet and the Striking and Support Forces NATO, both headquartered in Naples, Italy. He concurrently served as deputy commander, U.S. Naval Forces Europe and deputy commander, U.S. Naval Forces Africa. In 2011, he was designated as the Joint Force Maritime Component Commander (JFMCC) for Operation Odyssey Dawn, the U.S.-led coalition operation against Libya.

=== Assistant to the Chairman of the Joint Chiefs of Staff ===
In October 2011, he assumed the position of Assistant to the Chairman of the Joint Chiefs of Staff. In this capacity, he served as the Chairman's direct representative to the U.S. Secretary of State. He was also the designated U.S. Roadmap Monitor for the Middle East Peace Process.

=== Commander, U.S. Pacific Fleet ===
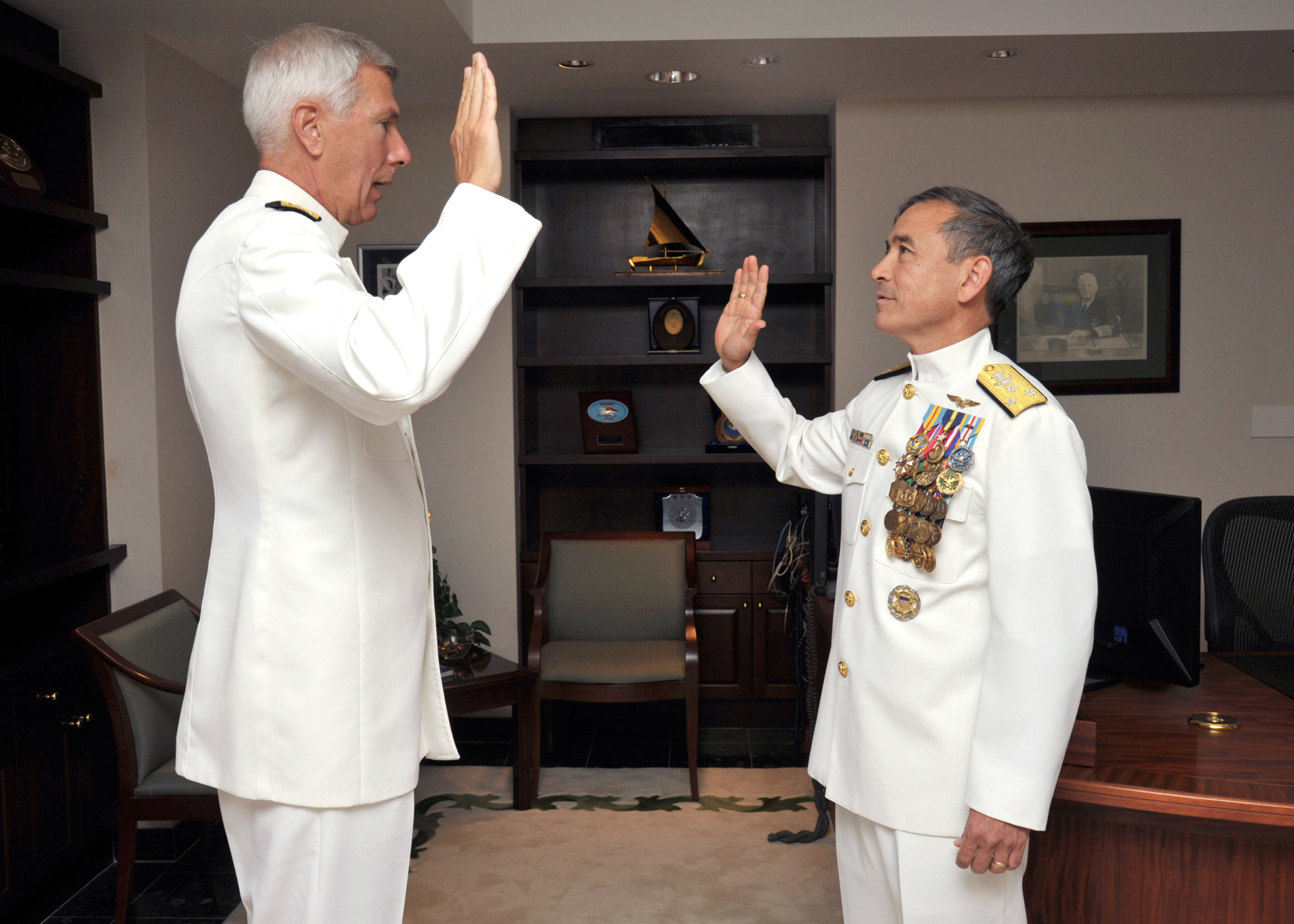
Harris is promoted to admiral by Admiral Samuel J. Locklear III, commander of U.S. Pacific Command, on October 16, 2013.

Harris was promoted to admiral and assumed command of the US Pacific Fleet on October 16, 2013. He has been critical of Chinese land reclamation activities in the South China Sea saying "(China is) creating a great wall of sand".

=== Commander, U.S. Pacific Command ===
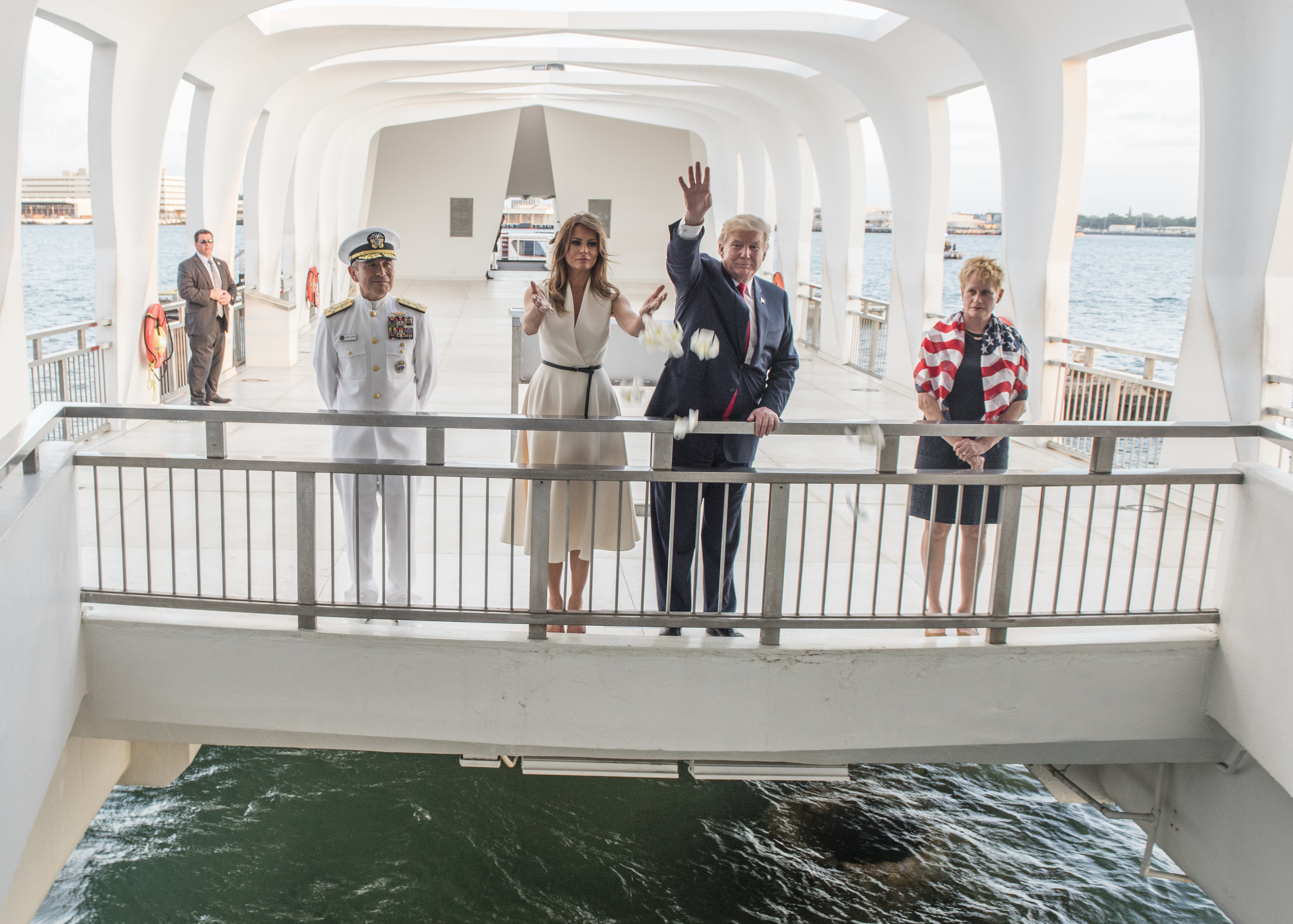
ADM Harris and his wife visiting the USS Arizona Memorial, with President Donald Trump and First Lady Melania Trump in 2017

Harris was nominated on September 22, 2014, by President Barack Obama to command the US Pacific Command. His appointment was confirmed by the Senate on December 11, 2014. Harris took command of USPACOM on May 27, 2015. He regarded North Korea as the biggest threat to security in Asia, calling for diplomacy backed by military power to "bring Kim Jong-Un to his senses; not to his knees" in pursuit of peaceful denuclearization of the Korean Peninsula.

In December 2016, Harris led the military commemoration activities for the 75th anniversary of the attacks on Pearl Harbor and Oahu. On 5 December, he paid tribute to Japanese-Americans who served in World War II. He delivered the keynote speech during National Pearl Harbor Remembrance Day, 7 December, and accompanied President Barack Obama and Japanese Prime Minister Shinzō Abe to render honors at the USS Arizona Memorial on 27 December. The visit – the first by a Japanese Prime Minister to the Memorial – was hailed by President Obama as "a historic gesture of reconciliation." He called for the resurgence of the Quad—the informal grouping of like-minded democracies of the U.S., Japan, Australian, and India—at the inaugural Raisina Dialogue in New Delhi in 2016. In 2017, he began publicly advocating for the renegotiation of, and potential withdrawal from, "unilaterally self-limiting treaties," including the Intermediate-Range Nuclear Force (INF) Treaty.

=== U.S. Ambassador to South Korea ===
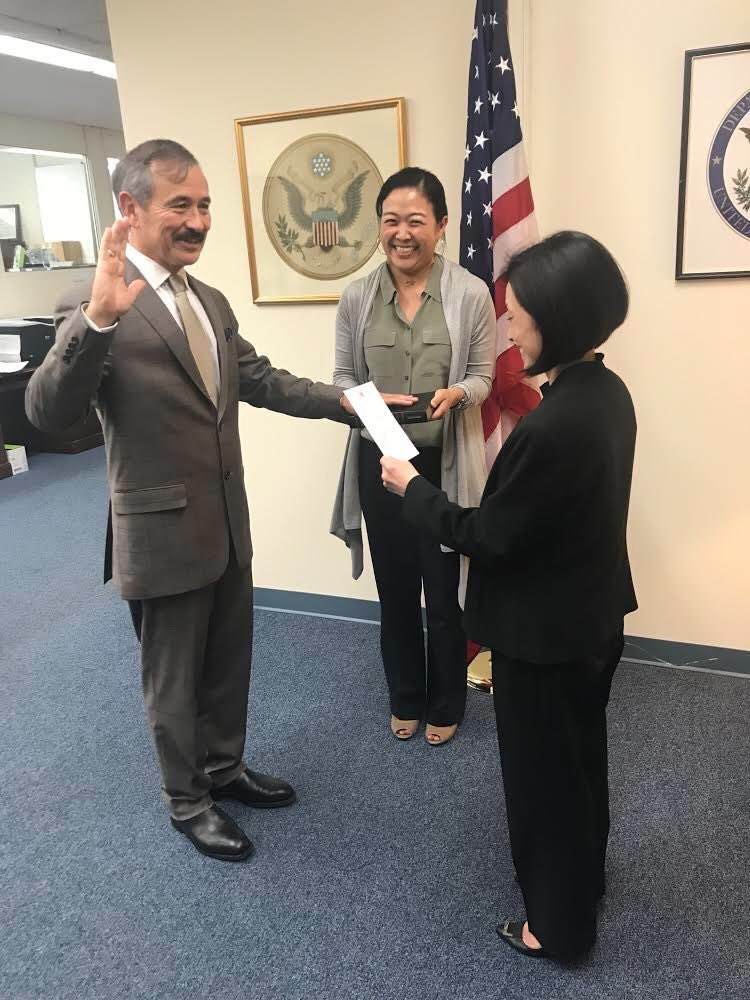
Harris is sworn in as the U.S. ambassador to South Korea, 2018

Harris was nominated by President Donald Trump to serve as U.S. Ambassador to Australia in February 2018, but was renominated to become Ambassador to South Korea by Trump at the suggestion of newly sworn-in Secretary of State Mike Pompeo on May 23, 2018.

Harris was confirmed by the U.S. Senate to serve as Ambassador to South Korea by voice vote on June 28, 2018. On June 29, 2018, Harris was officially sworn in as the new United States Ambassador to South Korea.

One of the major issues Harris had to take forward was increasing South Korea's share of the costs for joint security responsibilities, which President Trump wished to see increased from $830 million to about $5 billion annually.

In April 2020, Harris was reportedly planning on stepping down as ambassador in the coming months. In late April 2020, Harris tweeted a congratulatory message to the Republic of Korea (ROK) on its delivery of a Global Hawk UAV that the country purchased from the United States through U.S. Foreign Military Sales (FMS), which is managed and supervised by the Department of State. The tweet received criticism from the Korean press citing ROKG authorities’ comments that it was an inappropriate disclosure, despite the purchase and delivery of the Global Hawk program having been part of the public record in both the United States and Republic of Korea since originally approved in 2012, and the fact that his tweet was previewed with the ROK Ministry of Defense.

He stepped down as ambassador in January 2021. In an interview with the Financial Times published on 5 February 2021, He said "Some of the race baiting, I was surprised by that" because of his part-Japanese background.

He was awarded South Korea's Order of Diplomatic Service Merit (Gwanghwa Medal) at a ceremony in Washington, D.C. on September 8, 2021.

== Controversy ==
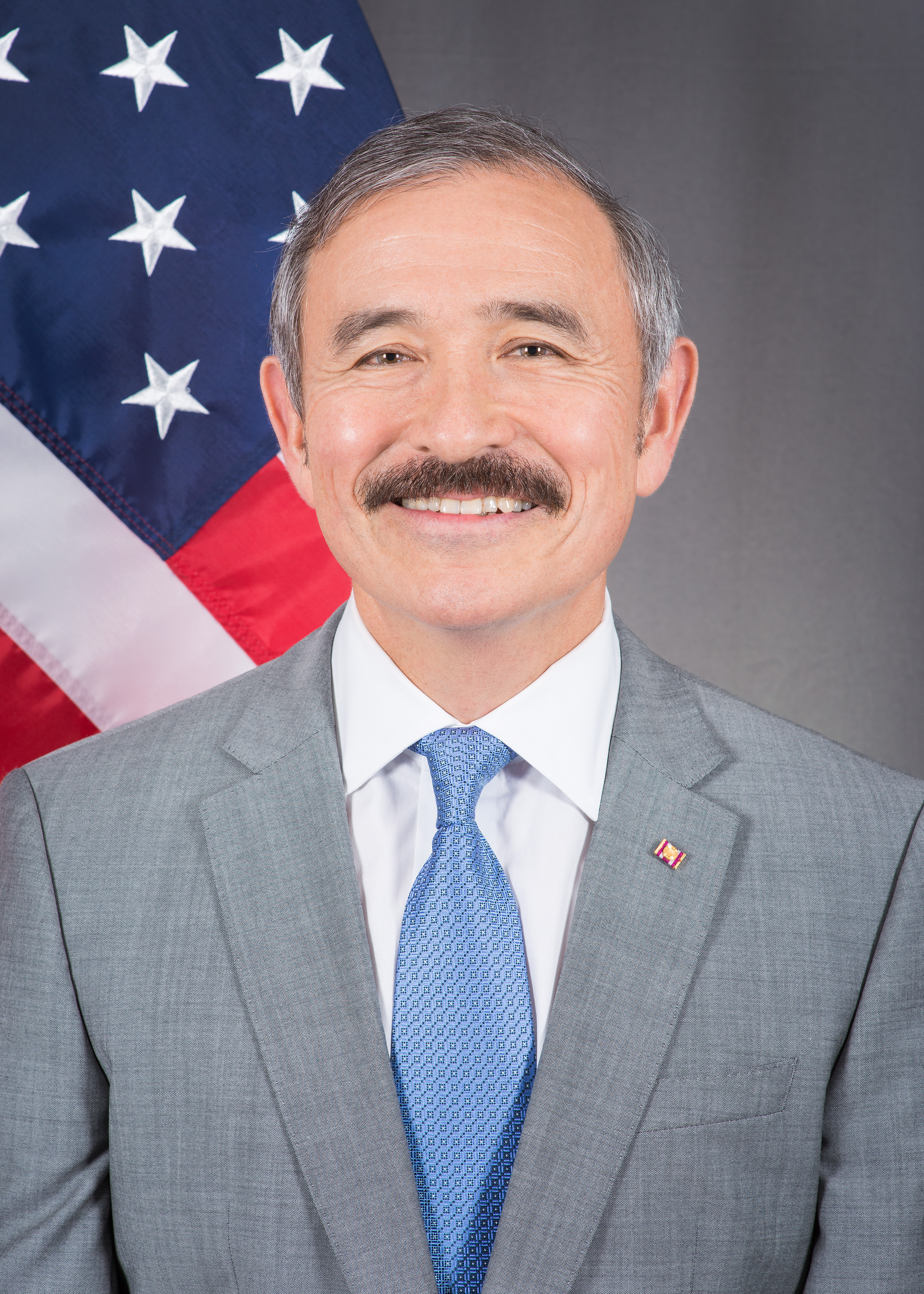
Harris's original ambassador portrait with his mustache

Some South Korean activists criticized Harris over his mustache, which they claimed was reminiscent of Japanese-appointed Governors-General (Itō Hirobumi) during Japanese rule over Korea. Harris disagreed with the criticisms and suggested they stemmed from his Japanese heritage. Harris shaved off his mustache in July 2020. A CNN article written by Joshua Berlinger suggested that given Harris's ancestry, the criticism of his mustache may be due to racism.

Some South Korean liberal media outlets claim that the controversy over his mustache was a backlash from supporters of the liberal faction against Harris's remarks on South Korea's political landscape. Harris expressed concern regarding politicians surrounding Moon Jae-in as "Jongbuk" (종북), and was later accused of acting like "Japanese colonial government" (일본 총독) by South Korean liberals. South Korean liberals and progressives generally support the Sunshine Policy, are skeptical of sanctions against North Korea, and express hostility toward Japan.

== Awards and decorations ==
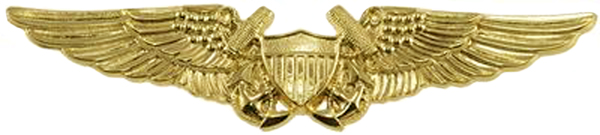

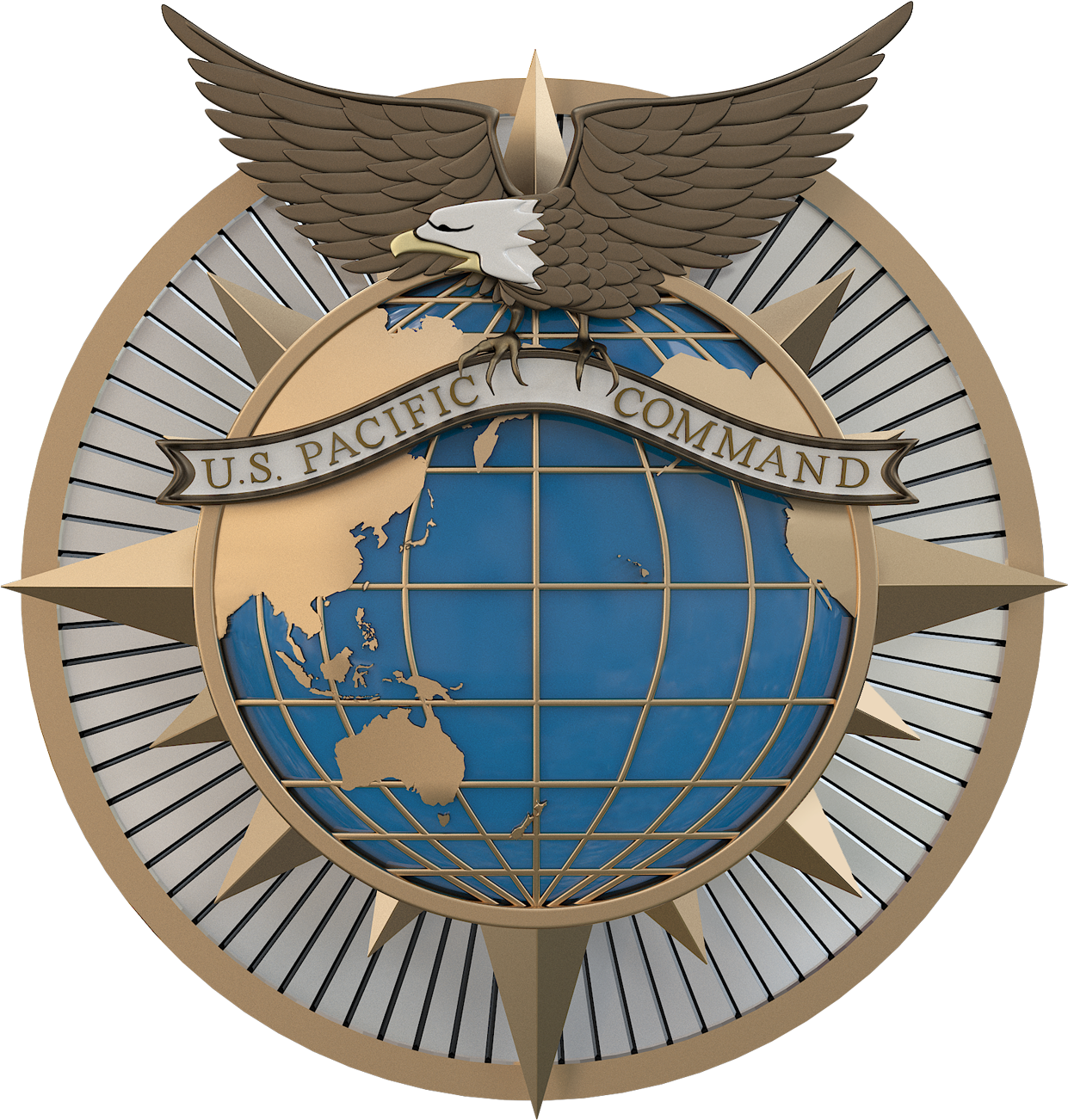

Naval Flight Officer insignia
Defense Distinguished Service Medal with one bronze oak leaf cluster
Navy Distinguished Service Medal with 2 gold award stars	Defense Superior Service Medal with two bronze oak leaf clusters	Legion of Merit with 2 award stars
Bronze Star with 1 award star	Meritorious Service Medal with 3 award stars	Air Medal with bronze Strike/Flight numeral 1
Joint Service Commendation Medal	Navy and Marine Corps Commendation Medal with 4 award stars	Navy and Marine Corps Achievement Medal
Joint Meritorious Unit Award	Navy Unit Commendation with 3 bronze service stars	Navy Meritorious Unit Commendation with 1 service star
Navy E Ribbon with 3 Battle "E" devices	Department of State Distinguished Honor Award	Navy Expeditionary Medal with 1 service star
National Defense Service Medal with 2 service stars	Armed Forces Expeditionary Medal	Southwest Asia Service Medal with 3 service stars
Afghanistan Campaign Medal with 1 service star	Global War on Terrorism Expeditionary Medal	Global War on Terrorism Service Medal
Military Outstanding Volunteer Service Medal	Navy Sea Service Deployment Ribbon with 4 service stars	Navy & Marine Corps Overseas Service Ribbon with 2 silver and 2 bronze service stars
Order of National Security Merit, Tong-il Medal (Republic of Korea)	Meritorious Service Medal (Military) (Singapore)	Legion of Honour, Officier Degree (France)
Order of the Rising Sun (Japan)	Legion of Honor, Komandante Degree (Philippines)	Medal for International Military Cooperation (Mongolia)
Order of Australia (military grade)	Philippine Republic Presidential Unit Citation	Kuwait Liberation Medal (Saudi Arabia)
Kuwait Liberation Medal (Kuwait)	Navy Expert Rifleman Medal	Navy Expert Pistol Shot Medal
Command at Sea insignia
United States Pacific Command badge

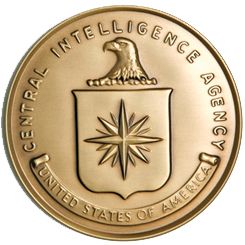
- Harris also received the CIA Agency Seal Medal as well as a foreign badge.

=== Foreign orders, decorations and medals ===
- Order of National Security Merit, Tong-il (1st Class) Medal (South Korea), awarded 3 November 2014 by ROK Chief of Naval Operations Adm. Hwang Ki-chul, on behalf of President Park Geun-hye, for "distinguished service and meritorious contributions to the security of the Republic of Korea" while serving as Commander, U.S. Pacific Fleet.
- Meritorious Military Service Medal (Singapore), awarded 17 October 2017 by Minister for Defence Dr. Ng Eng Hen, for “significant contributions toward enhancing the longstanding and excellent defence relations between the United States and Singapore” as Commander, U.S. Pacific Command.
- Officier (Officer) of the Legion of Honour (France), awarded 11 April 2018, by Ambassador Gérard Araud.
- Grand Cordon of the Order of the Rising Sun (Japan), awarded 26 April 2018, by Minister of Defense Itsunori Onodera on behalf of Emperor of Japan.
- Komandante (Commander) of the Legion of Honor (Philippines), awarded 27 April 2018 by Executive Secretary Salvador Medialdea on behalf of President Rodrigo Duterte.
- Medal for International Military Cooperation (Mongolia), awarded 27 April 2018 by Lieutenant General Dulamsürengiin Davaa, Chief of General Staff of the Mongolian Armed Forces, on behalf of Minister of Defense Nyamaagiin Enkhbold.
- Honorary Officer (AO) of the Order of Australia, awarded 29 May 2018 by Governor General of Australia General Sir Peter Cosgrove as part of the 2018 Special honours list, for “distinguished service to the military relationship between Australia and the United States through leadership, passion, and strategic foresight.”

== Personal life ==
Harris is married to Brunhilde Kempf "Bruni" Bradley. Bruni Bradley is a 1984 Naval Academy graduate and former Navy commander who retired after 25 years of service and now is a member of the board of directors for the Military Child Education Coalition.

Military offices
Preceded by Mark J. Edwards	Deputy Chief of Naval Operations for Communication Networks of the United States Navy; 2008-2009	Position abolished
Preceded by Bruce W. Clingan	Commander of the United States Sixth Fleet; 2009-2011	Succeeded by Frank Craig Pandolfe
Preceded by Bruce W. Clingan	Commander of Naval Striking and Support Forces NATO; 2009-2011	Succeeded by Frank Craig Pandolfe
Preceded by Paul J. Selva	Assistant to the Chairman of the Joint Chiefs of Staff; 2011-2013	Succeeded by Kurt W. Tidd
Preceded by Cecil D. Haney	Commander of the United States Pacific Fleet; 2013–2015	Succeeded by Scott H. Swift
Preceded by Samuel J. Locklear	Commander of the United States Pacific Command; 2015–2018	Succeeded by Philip S. Davidson as Commander of the United States Indo-Pacific Command
Diplomatic posts
Preceded by Mark Lippert	United States Ambassador to South Korea; 2018–2021	Succeeded by Philip Goldberg
