= Gray Owl Award =

The Gray Owl Award is presented to the senior naval flight officer (NFO) on continuous active duty in the U.S. Navy or Marine Corps who has held that designation for the longest period of time.

A naval flight officer in the U.S. Navy and Marine Corps is distinct from a naval aviator in that the aviator pilots the aircraft, while an NFO provides knowledge and expertise to assist piloting, such as in navigation, airborne weapons targeting and delivery, aerodynamics, flight planning, as well as piloting and safety.

By virtue of being qualified for the Gray Owl Trophy, which by definition represents long years of dedicated service to the Navy or Marine Corps, the recipient is considered “a symbol of stalwart and intrepid professionalism.”

Similar awards include the Gray Eagle Award, presented to the Naval Aviator on continuous active duty in the U.S. Navy or Marine Corps who has held that designation for the longest period of time; the Ancient Albatross Award, an identical honor for United States Coast Guard aviators; the Old Salt Award, presented to the surface warfare officer serving on continuous active duty with the earliest surface warfare officer qualification.

== History ==
Grumman Aerospace Corporation (now the Northrop Grumman Corp.) awarded the first Gray Owl Trophy to U.S. Navy Captain George N. LaRoque in June 1979.

=== Original idea ===
The award traces its origins to 1978, when U.S. Navy Captain Kenn Haas decided that there should be an award for the NFO community that equaled the Gray Eagle Trophy. Haas asked Grumman Aerospace Corporation to sponsor the award, the proposal was accepted and the first formal presentation of the Gray Owl was held the next year. Haas later became the third recipient of the Gray Owl in 1983.

== Trophy ==
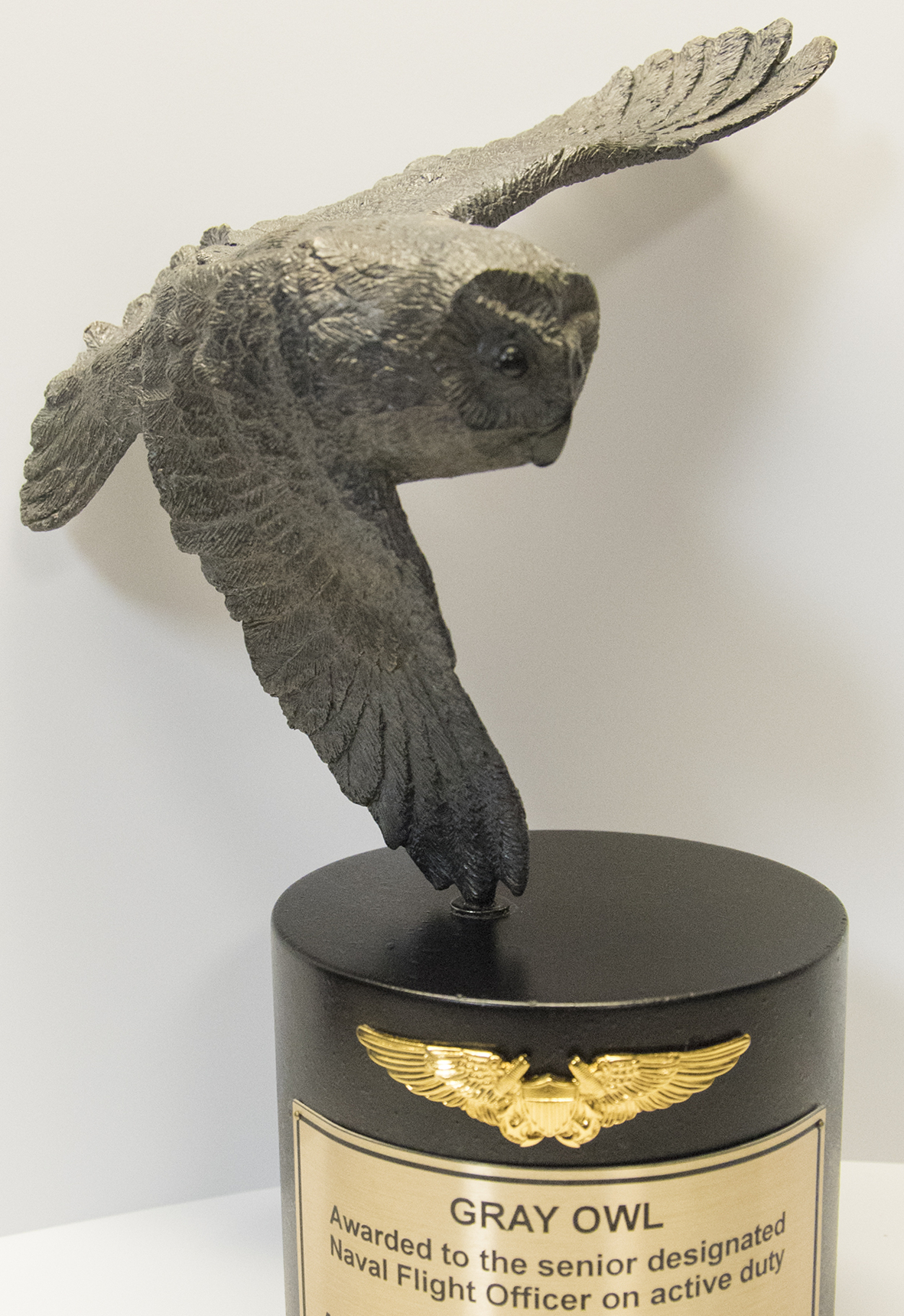
A Gray Owl Award.

The trophy takes the form of a sculpture of an owl mounted atop a mahogany base. Each recipient's name plus the date and duration of their time holding the Gray Owl are engraved on the trophy.

The Gray Owl Trophy may be kept in possession of and displayed by the command to which the Gray Owl is assigned. Otherwise, it may be placed in the custody of the National Museum of Naval Aviation on a temporary basis until required for presentation to the successor.

When the incumbent retires or dies, the award is passed from the previous holder to the next earliest designated NFO on active duty. The ceremony should be conducted as near as practicable to the official date of succession with both principals present, unless physically impossible. “…Presentation ceremonies, while perhaps light, should be nonetheless dignified.”

== Eligibility ==
Eligibility for the Gray Owl Trophy Award is determined by the official active-duty precedence list for NFOs, on continuous service, not recalled, who has held that designation for the longest period of time. The date of designation as an NFO is the governing factor for determining who will receive the award from the list of active duty officers. In the event two or more NFOs on active duty have been designated on the same date, the senior one qualifies as the Gray Owl.

== Recipients ==
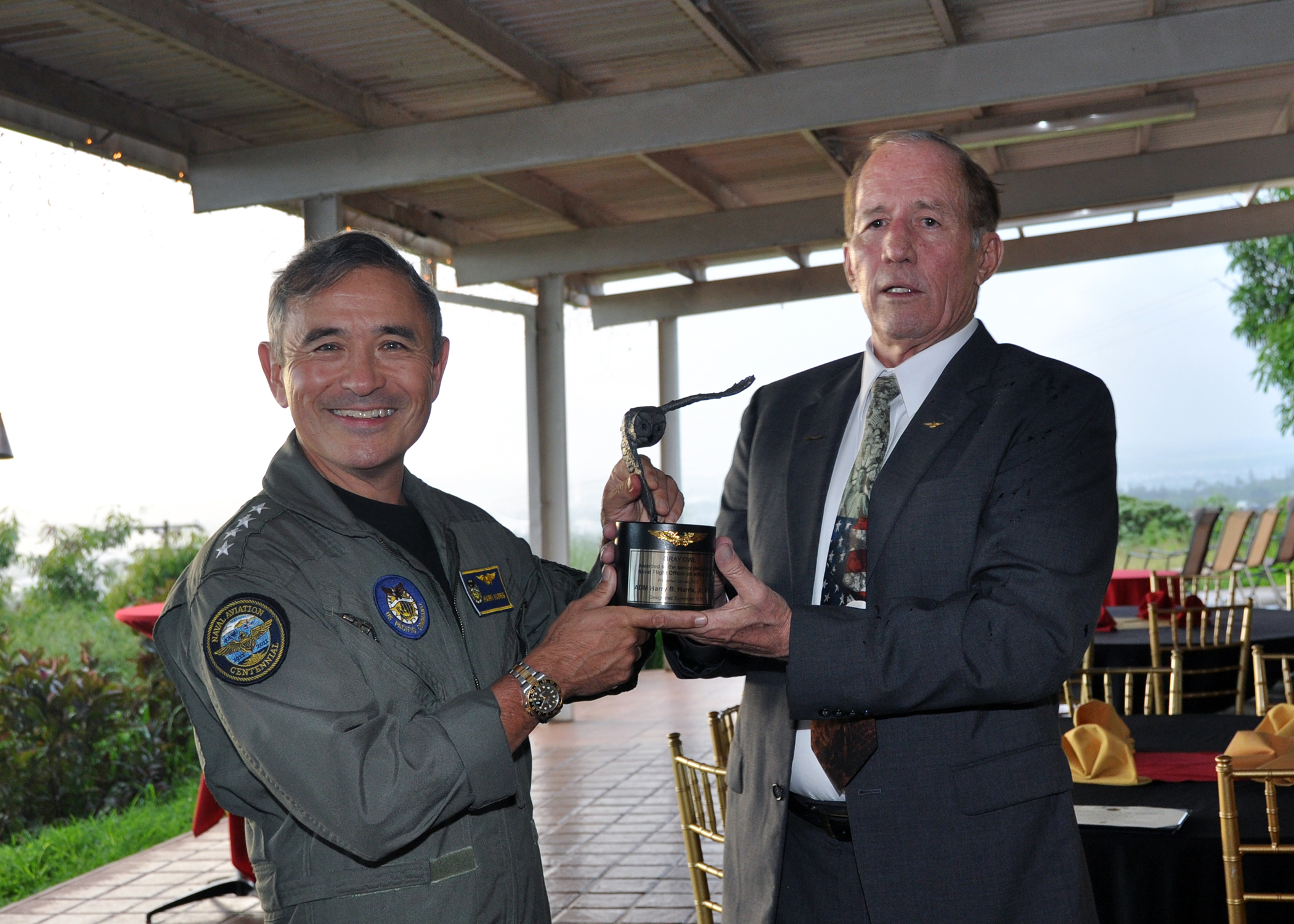
ADM Harris accepts the Gray Owl Award from Northrop Grumman executive and retired U.S. Navy Captain Brick Nelson, 13 November 2015.

The current Gray Owl is VADM Buck relieved VADM Mewbourne, who received the award from the previous Gray Owl, VADM Bruce Lindsey (his Naval Academy classmate) in January 2020. VADM Lindsey held the award since June 2019, receiving it from VADM Carter in 2018. Vice Admiral Walter E. Carter Jr. VADM Carter was passed the award from VADM Herman A. Shelanski, Naval Inspector General, until the later's retirement on 1 August 2018. Shelanski received the trophy and title from Admiral Harry B. Harris Jr., Commander, U.S. Pacific Command, in a ceremony at the National Naval Aviation Museum on 10 May 2018.

| Name | Rank (Upon Receipt) | Dates as Gray Owl |
|---|---|---|
| George N. LaRoque | CAPT | 1979–1982 |
| R.L. Rhodes | CAPT | 1982–1983 |
| Kenn Haas | CAPT | 1983–1984 |
| Thomas J. Johnson | COMO | 1984–1990 |
| Richard M. Dunleavy | VADM | 1990–1992 |
| Stephen F. Loftus | VADM | 1992–1994 |
| Jon S. Coleman | RADM | 1994–1997 |
| Herbert A. Browne II | VADM | 1997–2000 |
| Joseph S. Mobley | VADM | 2000–2001 |
| William J. Fallon | ADM | 2001–2008 |
| James D. Kelly | RADM | 2008–2009 |
| Gerald R. Beaman | VADM | 2009–2013 |
| Allen G. Myers | VADM | 2013–2014 |
| David H. Buss | VADM | 2014–2015 |
| Harry B. Harris Jr. | ADM | 2015–2018 |
| Herman A. Shelanski | VADM | May 2018–Aug 2018 |
| Walter E. Carter Jr. | VADM | Oct 2018 – July 2019 |
| Bruce Lindsey | VADM | July 2019 – Jan 2020 |
| Dee L. Mewbourne | VADM | January 2020 – June 2022 |
| Sean Buck | VADM | June 2022 - c. Sep 2023 |
