= John C. Aquilino =

American naval aviator and admiral

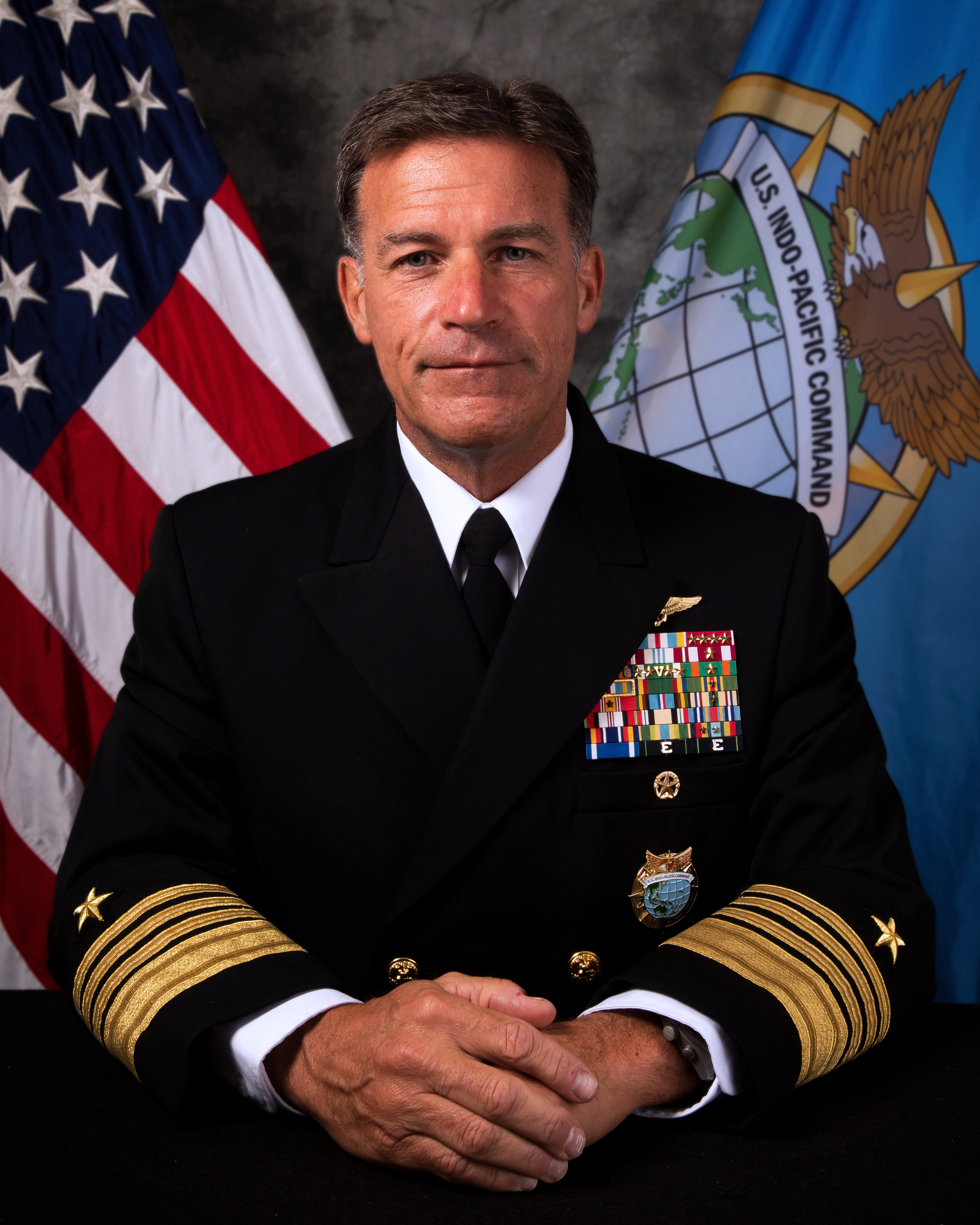
- Born: John Christopher Aquilino; 1961 (age 64–65); Huntington, New York, U.S.
- Education: United States Naval Academy (BS)
- Military career
- Allegiance: United States
- Branch: United States Navy
- Service years: 1984–2024
- Rank: Admiral
- Nickname: Lung
- Commands: United States Indo-Pacific Command; United States Pacific Fleet; United States Naval Forces Central Command; Combined Maritime Forces; United States Fifth Fleet; Carrier Strike Group 2; Carrier Air Wing 2; VF-11
- Conflicts: Operation Deny Flight; Operation Deliberate Force; Operation Southern Watch; Operation Noble Eagle; War in Afghanistan; Iraq War
- Awards: Navy Distinguished Service Medal (3); Defense Superior Service Medal; Legion of Merit (5); Bronze Star (2)
- John C. Aquilino's voice Aquilino's opening statement at a Senate Armed Services Committee hearing on the 2022 USINDOPACOM posture Recorded March 10, 2022

John Christopher Aquilino (born 1961) is a retired United States Navy admiral who last served as the commander of United States Indo-Pacific Command from 2021 to 2024. He previously served as the commander of the United States Pacific Fleet and before that, commander of the United States Fifth Fleet and Combined Maritime Forces.

Aquilino was also the Navy's Old Goat, the longest serving United States Naval Academy graduate on active duty, having received the title and accompanying decanter from James F. Caldwell Jr. on January 9, 2024.

== Naval career ==
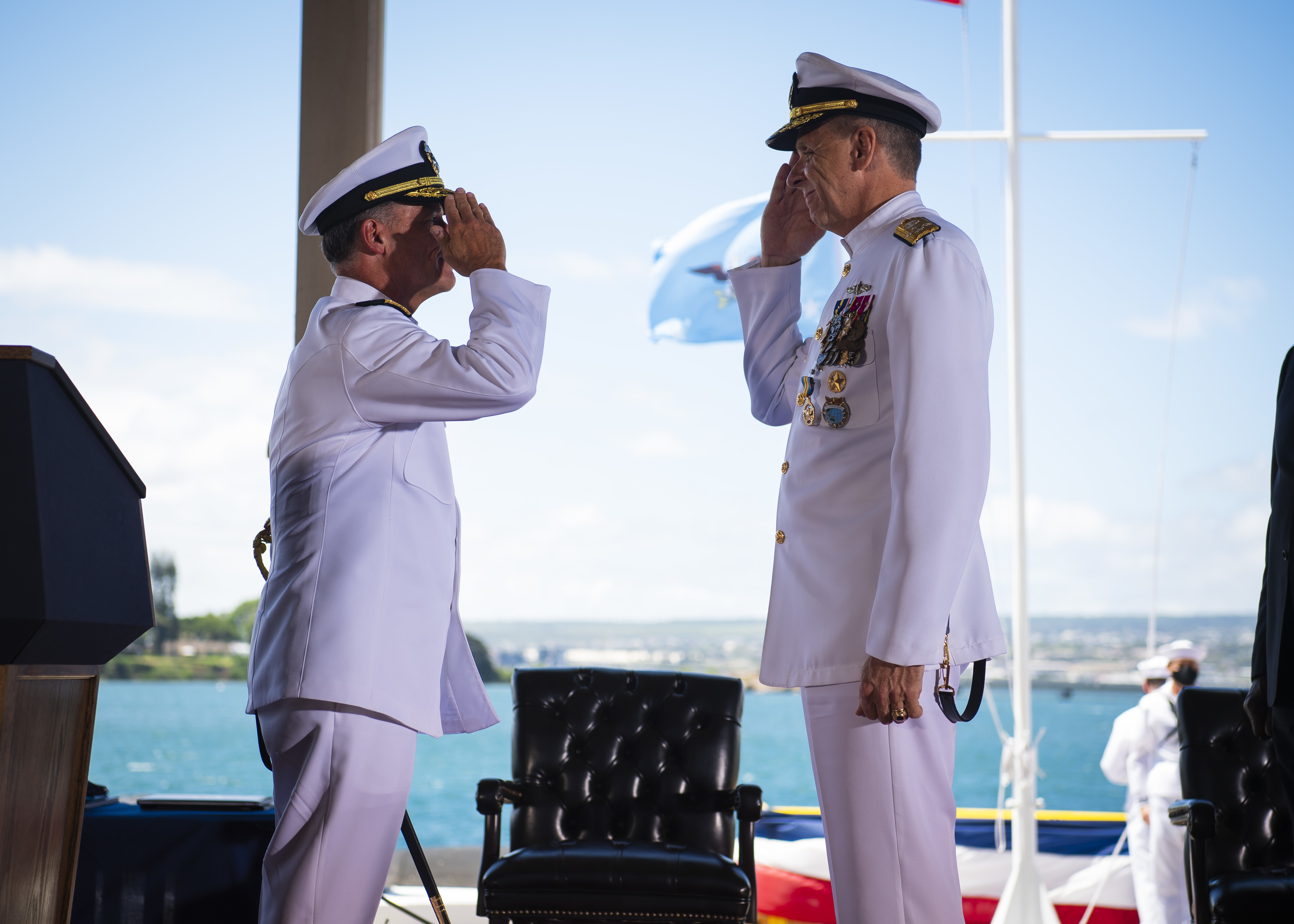
Aquilino relieves Adm. Philip S. Davidson as INDOPACOM commander on April 30, 2021.

Aquilino graduated from the United States Naval Academy in 1984, earning a Bachelor of Science in Physics. He subsequently entered flight training and earned his wings in August 1986. Aquilino graduated from the Navy Fighter Weapons School (Top Gun) and the Joint Forces Staff College, and completed Harvard Kennedy School's Executive Education Program in National and International Security.

Aquilino's operational assignments include numerous fighter squadrons flying the F-14 A/B Tomcat and the F/A-18 C/E/F Hornet. His fleet assignments include the Ghost Riders of Fighter Squadron (VF) 142 and the Black Aces of VF-41. He commanded the Red Rippers of VF-11, Carrier Air Wing 2 and Carrier Strike Group (CSG) 2/George H.W. Bush Strike Group. He has made extended deployments in support of Operations Deny Flight, Deliberate Force, Southern Watch, Noble Eagle, Enduring Freedom and Iraqi Freedom.

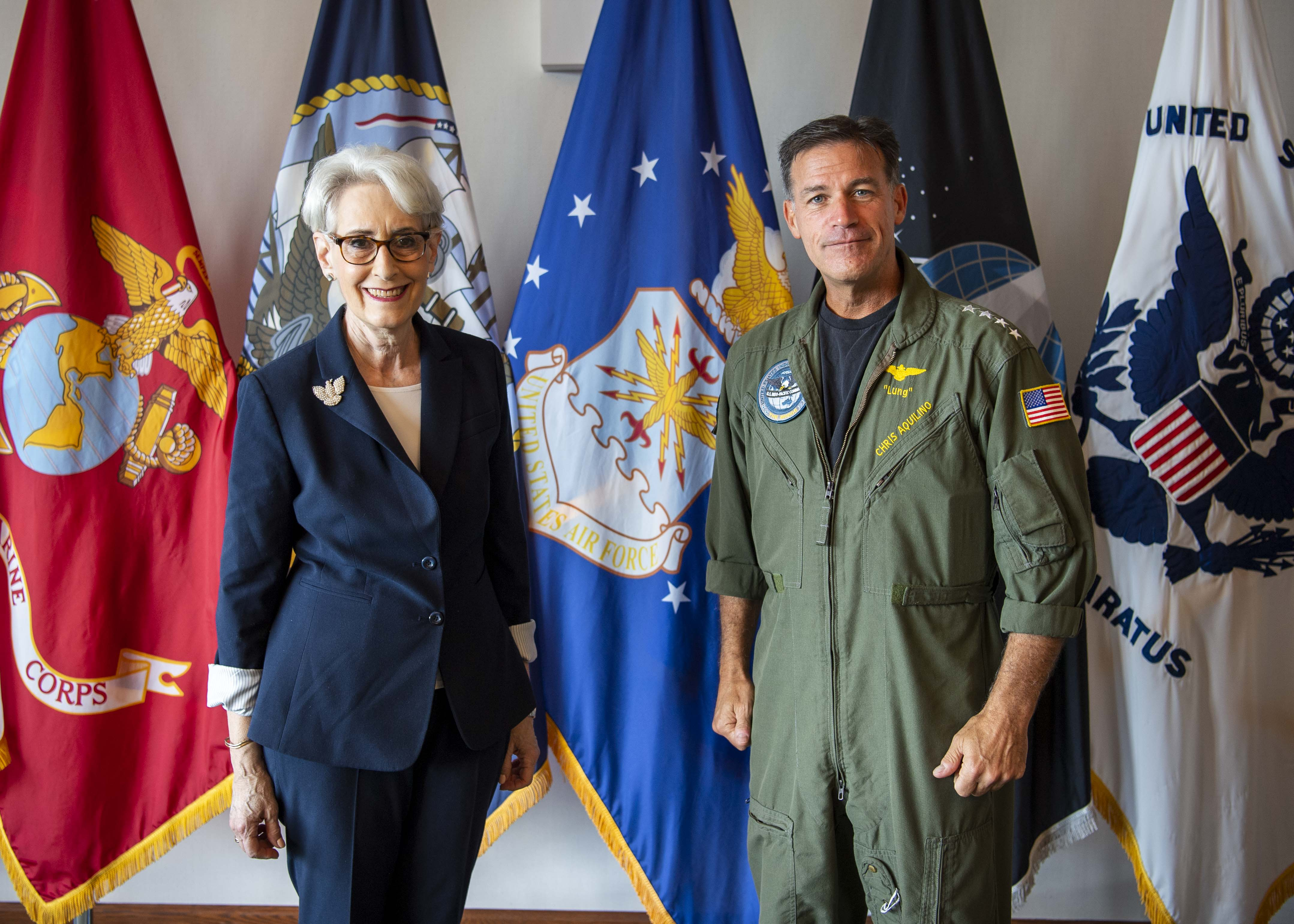
Deputy Secretary of State Wendy Sherman meets with Aquilino in Honolulu in June 2021.

Aquilino's shore tour assignments include duties as an adversary instructor pilot flying the A-4, F-5 and F-16N aircraft for the Challengers of VF-43; operations officer of Strike Weapons and Tactics School, Atlantic; flag aide to the vice chief of naval operations; special assistant for weapons and advanced development in the Office of the Legislative Affairs for the Secretary of Defense; director of air wing readiness and training for Commander, Naval Air Forces, Atlantic Fleet; and executive assistant to the commander, United States Fleet Forces Command.

Aquilino's flag assignments include director of strategy and policy (J5), United States Joint Forces Command; deputy director, joint force coordinator (J31), the Joint Staff; commander, CSG-2, director of maritime operations, United States Pacific Fleet (N04); deputy chief of naval operations for operations, plans and strategy (N3/N5); and as commander, United States Naval Forces Central Command, United States 5th Fleet, Combined Maritime Forces.

Aquilino assumed duties as commander, United States Pacific Fleet, on May 17, 2018, the 63rd commander since the fleet's Pearl Harbor headquarters was established in February 1941. He was relieved of the same duties on the morning of April 30, 2021, by Samuel Paparo before relieving Philip S. Davidson as commander of Indo-Pacific Command later that day.

After Lisa Franchetti was removed as chief of naval operations by the second Trump administration in February 2025, Aqualino was among the candidates considered as a possible replacement.

== Awards and decorations ==
Naval Aviator insignia
Command at Sea insignia
United States Indo-Pacific Command Badge

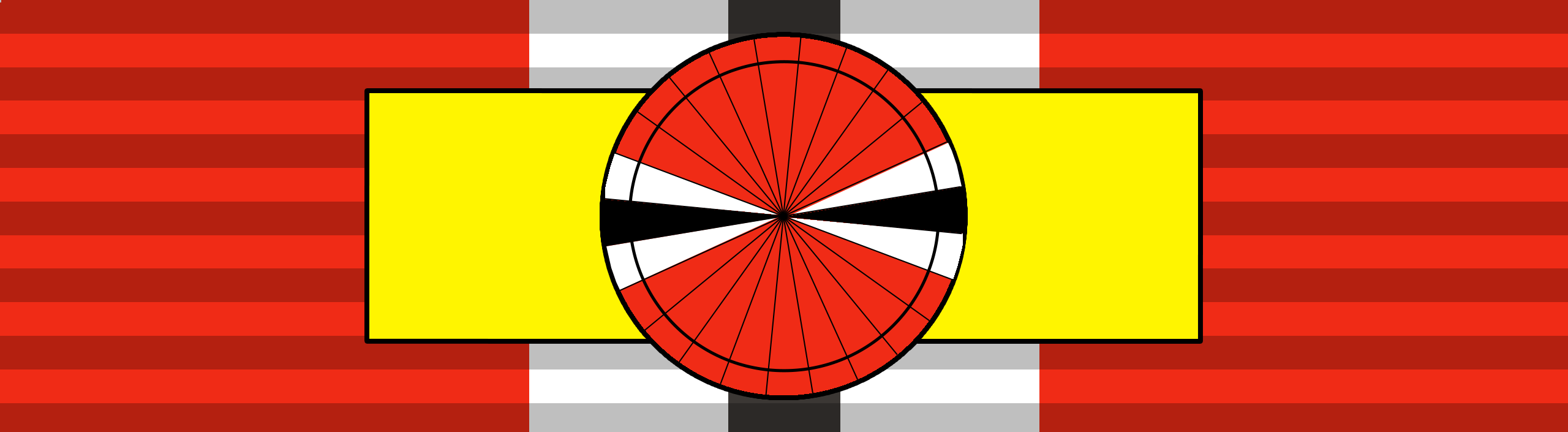
Navy Distinguished Service Medal with two gold award stars
Defense Superior Service Medal
Legion of Merit with four award stars
Bronze Star Medal with award star
Defense Meritorious Service Medal
Meritorious Service Medal with award star
Air Medal with bronze Strike/Flight numeral "6"
Navy and Marine Corps Commendation Medal with Combat V and four award stars
Navy and Marine Corps Achievement Medal with award star
Joint Meritorious Unit Award
Navy Unit Commendation
Navy Meritorious Unit Commendation with one bronze service star
National Defense Service Medal with service star
Armed Forces Expeditionary Medal
Southwest Asia Service Medal with service star
Afghanistan Campaign Medal
Iraq Campaign Medal
Global War on Terrorism Expeditionary Medal
Global War on Terrorism Service Medal
Armed Forces Service Medal
Navy Sea Service Deployment Ribbon with one silver and one bronze service stars
The Khalifiyyeh Order of Bahrain, 1st class
Honorary Officer of the Order of Australia, Military Division
NATO Medal for the former Yugoslavia
Navy Expert Rifleman Medal
Navy Expert Pistol Shot Medal

Military offices
Preceded by Gregory Nosal	Commander of Carrier Strike Group 2; 2013–2014	Succeeded by DeWolfe Miller III
Preceded by Kevin M. Donegan	Commander of the United States Naval Forces Central Command; 2017–2018	Succeeded by Scott Stearney
Preceded by Kevin M. Donegan	Commander of the United States Fifth Fleet; 2017–2018	Succeeded by Scott Stearney
Preceded by Scott H. Swift	Commander of the United States Pacific Fleet; 2018–2021	Succeeded by Samuel Paparo
Preceded by Philip S. Davidson	Commander of the United States Indo-Pacific Command; 2021–2024	Succeeded by Samuel Paparo
