= Peter Morris (playwright) =

American playwright (born 1973)

- Born: 9 November 1973 (age 53); Philadelphia, Pennsylvania, U.S.
- Education: Yale University; Somerville College, Oxford
- Occupations: Playwright, critic
- Writing career
- Notable work: Guardians

Peter Morris (born 9 November 1973) is an American playwright, television writer and critic, best known for his work in British theatre.

== Biography ==
Morris was born in Philadelphia and educated at The Haverford School and Yale University, graduating in 1997. He then studied at Somerville College, Oxford on a grant from the British Academy where he was active with OUDS as a writer and performer.

Morris' plays are noteworthy for their willingness to address difficult political topics, including the Abu Ghraib torture and prisoner abuse in Guardians and the murder of James Bulger in "The Age of Consent". He is additionally known for his innovative adaptations of work by previous writers, including Aristophanes, Gilbert and Sullivan, and Maurice Maeterlinck.

Morris has been included as part of the British school of "In-Yer-Face Theatre" by critic Aleks Sierz.

=== Career ===
==== The Age of Consent ====
Morris' play The Age of Consent, starring Ben Silverstone and Katherine Parkinson, "generated enormous controversy" on its premiere at the Edinburgh Fringe Festival in 2001, due to its examination of the aftermath of the murder of James Bulger, and led to calls for a public boycott after the play's sympathetic stance towards the ten-year-old children convicted of Bulger's murder was publicly condemned by the mother of James Bulger as "sick and pathetic", but the play was publicly defended by the director of the Edinburgh Fringe, who stated that "controversy is always a part of the festival and it would not be the fringe festival if some difficult issues were not being tackled".

Morris was invited by The Guardian to speak about the controversy himself on the newspaper's comment page, where, in a piece entitled "In Defence of My Play", he claimed that: "…what I sense…is an attack on my desire, if not my right, to handle this topic in a play. And here I must stand up for what theatre does. Theatre remains our best, our most prodigious and elastic forum for moral inquiry. An audience gathers to assert its power of judgment." Morris was publicly defended by a number of prominent playwrights, including David Edgar.

The production transferred to London's Bush Theatre, where New York Times critic Ben Brantley claimed that Morris was part of a new generation of "angry young men" in British theatre, "as explosive, nihilistic and exasperated as ever"—failing to note that, while the play was set in contemporary England, the writer was, in fact, not English but American. In a later interview with the New Statesman, Morris claimed "I really don't have any choice but to continue working in London because the kind of stuff I want to write won't be produced in the US."

The Age of Consent was later staged in Dublin, Rome, Berlin, Tokyo, and Sydney. The 2008 Australian production generated similar controversy to the premiere, with condemnation from the tabloid newspapers that "the murderers of British toddler Jamie Bulger are being given a sympathetic treatment"

==== Guardians ====
Morris' play Guardians, which premiered at the Edinburgh Fringe Festival in 2005, won the Fringe First Award and the Amnesty International Freedom of Expression Award, and transferred to London later that year. The play received its American premiere with The Culture Project in New York City in 2006, starring Lee Pace and Katherine Moennig, directed by Jason Moore.

The play was praised by Karen J. Greenberg—Executive Director of the Center on Law and Security at the NYU School of Law and the author of The Torture Papers: The Road to Abu Ghraib, The Torture Debate in America, and Al Qaeda Now—in an article where she claims that the play represents a "truly profound" analysis of America's role in, and response to, the Abu Ghraib scandal. Greenberg's article, entitled "Split Screens", originally appeared in The American Prospect magazine; it is included in a 2007 book of essays entitled "One of the Guys: Women as Aggressors and Torturers", edited by Tara McKelvey with foreword by Barbara Ehrenreich and afterword by Cynthia Enloe. Greenberg's essay concludes with this praise for the play:

"Who, really, are the victimizers? ... The answer is complex, but would come to light with some clarity in an independent investigation or Congressional inquiry ... Until this occurs, however, the American public will have to glean what it can from the words of a playwright." (Greenberg, "Split Screens")

==== Other plays ====
His play Gaudeamus, a contemporary adaptation of the Assemblywomen by Aristophanes, was staged at the Arcola in London in 2006, starring Kika Markham and Chipo Chung.

Morris was a founding member of the Obie-winning theatre company The Civilians, and worked with them on two productions, Gone Missing and Nobody's Lunch.

From 2003 to 2007, Morris taught as writer-in-residence at LAMDA, where he staged A Million Hearts for Mosley, which used the music from The Yeomen of the Guard by Gilbert and Sullivan to stage an exploration of the British Union of Fascists and the careers of Sir Oswald Mosley and his wife Diana Mosley.

Morris' adaptation of La Mort de Tintagiles by Maurice Maeterlinck, entitled "The Death of Tintagel", was published in The Paris Review in 2003, and will be staged for the first time in London in autumn 2010, at People Show Studios, produced by Saltpeter Productions and directed by Vik Sivalingam.

==== Criticism ====
Morris has written criticism for various publications in England including Areté, the Guardian, the Observer, and the Independent.

At Yale Morris was a student of Harold Bloom: later Morris published a lengthy response to Bloom's work The Anxiety of Influence, entitled "Harold Bloom, Parody, and the Other Tradition", in The Salt Companion to Harold Bloom, a seventy-fifth birthday festschrift for Bloom.

Morris' extremely negative response to Bloom's later work is acknowledged by Harold Bloom in his "Afterword" to the volume, where Bloom stated that "I note that one contribution to this volume suggests that I have become a Moldy Fig, a term applied to Dixielanders by the great Bop jazz artists of my youth". This is a response to Morris' claim that Bloom's work, in The Western Canon and afterward, is "frankly jejune", referring to Bloom as "a latter-day Mortimer J. Adler garbed in the ill-fitting mantle of Ecclesiastes, author of works like How to Read and Why and Where Shall Wisdom be Found?, in which Bloom does for the great writers what Liberace did for the great composers."

==== Television ====
Morris was a contestant on the 1989 Jeopardy! Teen Tournament, and was invited back for the 1998 Jeopardy! Teen Reunion Tournament. On both occasions he informed Alex Trebek that his future career plans included the Papacy.

As a television writer, Morris wrote for the fourth and final season of Born and Bred on the BBC. From 2007 to 2010, he wrote for all three seasons of Katy Brand's Big Ass Show on ITV, and additionally performed as a member of the show's ensemble cast.

== Work ==
Plays

- The Square Root of Minus One (1998)
- Marge (1999)
- The Varieties of Religious Experience (1999)
- A & R (2000)
- Second Amendment Club (2000)
- The Age of Consent (2001)
- Pro Bono Publico (2002)
- Gone Missing (2003)
- A Million Hearts for Mosley (2004)
- Guardians (2005)
- Gaudeamus (2006)
- The Salivation Army (2007)
- The Death of Tintagel (2010)

Publications

- The Age of Consent (London: Methuen, 2002)
- "The Death of Tintagel" (Paris Review 168, 2003)
- Guardians (London: Oberon, 2005)
- Gaudeamus (London: Oberon, 2006)
- Guardians: Acting Edition (New York: Dramatists Play Service, 2007)
- The Salt Companion to Harold Bloom (Cambridge: Salt Press, 2007)

== Writings available online ==
"The Varieties of Religious Experience" (one-act verse play) *"TARPAULIN SKY DRAMA: Peter Morris, "The Varieties of Religious Experience"". tarpaulinsky.com.

"In Defence of My Play", commentary piece on The Age of Consent *"In defence of my play | Guardian daily comment | guardian.co.uk". guardian.co.uk.

"If You're A Playwright, the US is No Place For Seriousness" *"Peter Morris: 'If you're a playwright, the US is no place for seriousness' - Features - Theatre & Dance - The Independent". independent.co.uk. Archived from the original on November 9, 2012.

"Masochism is the Key to Fringe Theatre" *"Edinburgh diary: 'Masochism is the key to fringe theatre' | Culture | The Guardian". guardian.co.uk. 7 August 2005.

"A Note from the Author: on The Death of Tintagel" *"Cash Advance | Debt Consolidation | Insurance | Free Credit Report at Deathoftintagel.com". Archived from the original on 2010-10-25.
