= This is Camp X-Ray =

Art installation by Jai Redman

Coordinates: 53.4666°N 2.2479°W

This is Camp X-Ray is an art installation created by the artist Jai Redman, a member of the Ultimate Holding Company (UHC) art collective. The installation was a full-scale replica of part of the United States military Guantanamo Bay detainment camp, and featured actors performing the roles of guards and prisoners in cells and interrogation rooms, as well as demonstration of known interrogation techniques.

This is Camp X-Ray was constructed in the Hulme area of the city of Manchester and was operational from Friday 10 October to Saturday 18 October 2003. Costing approximately £3000, the Arts Council England covered half the cost.

Due to the political nature of the project, the installation received a few complaints including from Conservative party MP Andrew Rosindell, and David Lee the editor of the arts newspaper The Jackdaw. Lee said "This is simply a reconstruction, it is bald documentary and has nothing to do with art. The Arts Council supports this kind of stuff rather than supporting good art. It is both corrupt and corrupting."

A DVD video documenting the live installation, entitled This is Camp X-Ray: Manchester Responds To Injustice With Art, by Damien Mahoney was released in December 2004. The DVD includes an interview with the sisters of Jamal Udeen Al-Harith, a Manchester resident who was detained in the real Camp X-Ray for two and a half years without charge. Al-Harith later traveled to Syria, joined the Islamic State, and was confirmed to have carried out a suicide car bombing at an Iraqi army base near Mosul in February 2017.
