= Guardians (play) =

Play written by Peter Morris

Guardians is an Off-Broadway play written by Peter Morris. It debuted at the 2005 Edinburgh Festival Fringe, winning the "Fringe First Award" and made its New York debut on April 11, 2006 at The Culture Project.

== Synopsis ==
In London, a tabloid journalist finds an opportunity to further his career by manufacturing photographs supposedly depicting British soldiers abusing Iraqi prisoners. He is identified only as "English Boy". This story is intercut with the confessional monologue of a young United States Army soldier from West Virginia who becomes a scapegoat in a scandal involving photographs of actual abuse. She is identified only as "American Girl".

It is later revealed that English Boy is a sexual sadist, taking pleasure in torturing his partners and taking advantage of his boyfriend's masochism for his own pleasure. It is also revealed that American Girl had an abusive sexual relationship with a superior officer. It is implied that these relationships may have furthered the main characters' descent.

== Inspiration ==
The story of American Girl is loosely based on that of Lynndie England, who was convicted of misconduct in the prisoner abuse scandal at Abu Ghraib prison in Iraq. That of the British journalist is based on a 2004 scandal at The Daily Mirror, where a fabricated photograph depicting Iraqi abuse at British soldiers' hands was published.

Karen J. Greenberg—who is Director of the Center on National Security at Fordham University's School of Law and the author of The Torture Papers: The Road to Abu Ghraib, The Torture Debate in America, and Al Qaeda Now—praised Morris's play highly, and published an article on Peter Morris and Guardians, in which she claims that the play represents a "truly profound" analysis of America's role in, and response to, the Abu Ghraib scandal. Greenberg's article, entitled "Split Screens", originally appeared in The American Prospect magazine; it is included in a 2007 book of essays entitled "One of the Guys: Women as Aggressors and Torturers", edited by Tara McKelvey with foreword by Barbara Ehrenreich and afterword by Cynthia Enloe. Greenberg's essay concludes with this praise for the play:

"Who, really, are the victimizers? ... The answer is complex, but would come to light with some clarity in an independent investigation or Congressional inquiry ... Until this occurs, however, the American public will have to glean what it can from the words of a playwright." (Greenberg, "Split Screens")

== August - September 2005 Edinburgh Fringe / London Run ==
=== Actors ===
- Hywel John - English Boy
- MyAnna Buring - American Girl

The play premiered at the Pleasance at the 2005 Edinburgh Festival Fringe, and immediately transferred to The Latchmere Theatre in London. It received a Scotsman Fringe First Award and was the runner-up for the Amnesty International Freedom of Expression Award.

== April 11, 2006 - May 25, 2006 Culture Project Run ==
=== Actors ===
- Lee Pace - English Boy
- Katherine Moennig - American Girl

Note: Lee Pace was nominated for a 2007 Lucille Lortel award for Outstanding Actor in a Lead Role for his performance.

=== Personnel ===
- Peter Morris - Writer
- Jason Moore - Director
- Richard Hoover - Set Designer
- Garin Marschall - Lighting
- Michelle R. Philips - Costume Designer
- Thomas J. Gates - Production Stage Manager
- Culture Project - General Manager

== May 8, 2006 - May 10, 2006 Newrite Theatre Company (Taunton, UK) Run ==
(Repeated again on July 28, 2006 as part of the Westival-the Arts Fest of the West.)

=== Actors ===
- James Foster now known as James Garland - English Boy
- Rebecca Wearing - American Girl

=== Personnel ===
- Peter Morris - Writer
- Sebastian Petit - Director
- Sebastian Petit - Set Designer
- Sebastian Petit - Lighting
- Brewhouse Theatre/Robert Miles - Director

== July 2, 2008 - July 5, 2008 Manhattan Theatre Source ==
Actors

- Zack Abramowitz - English Boy
- Meryl Sykes - American Girl

Personnel

- Peter Morris - Writer
- Joseph Giardina - Director
- Stephanie Caragliano - Stage Manager
- Alex Casagrande - Lighting
