= Hywel John =

Hywel John (born 21 June 1980) is a Welsh playwright and actor.

== Background ==
Hywel John grew up in Pembrokeshire, Wales, and London. He was educated at Highgate School, Bristol University from 1999, and studied at the London Academy of Music and Dramatic Art from 2002.

== Playwriting ==
His debut play, Pieces, premiered at Clwyd Theatr Cymru in March 2010, before transferring to Off-Broadway at 59E59 Theatres, New York City, later that year. It starred Welsh television and stage actor Steven Meo, alongside Louise Collins and Jennifer Kidd. It was directed by Kate Wasserberg. The Guardian compared it to the work of Harold Pinter, calling it "a demonic contemporary fairytale whose psychological surety will leave you in pieces." The Stage described it as "a fascinating piece, always gripping often very funny with a Brothers Grimm-like atmosphere."

This was followed by Rose, which was commissioned by film and stage actor Art Malik. It premiered at the Edinburgh Fringe Festival in 2011, starring Malik and his daughter Keira. The play was described by the London Evening Standard as "a gem" with a "subtle and compelling script". The Telegraph in its brief review described Rose as a "well-crafted, relevant, winningly performed new play."

=== Other works ===
Sevens Bridge (a public reading at Manhattan Theatre Club starring Zawe Ashton in December 2010); Joe (Lyric Hammersmith and Latitude Festival 2012 ); Boy (The Last Refuge, 2012 ).

== Acting ==
As an actor, roles include:

- The Bloody Sergeant and the Murderer in director Rupert Goold’s production of Macbeth in 2008, co-starring Sir Patrick Stewart. This production played the Chichester Festival Theatre, the Gielgud Theatre in London's West End, and New York City's Brooklyn Academy of Music (BAM) and the Lyceum Theatre on Broadway. It was nominated for a Tony for Best Revival in 2008. This production was turned into a film by BBC Films and PBS in 2010.
- English Boy in Guardians (play) by Peter Morris, which won the Fringe First Award at the Edinburgh Festival 2005M
- Yuri in ANGRY YOUNG MAN by Ben Woolf, which played the Trafalgar Studios in London's West End, and won the Best Play and Best Show Awards at the Adelaide Festival 2006.
- Tom Wingfield in THE GLASS MENAGERIE by Tennessee Williams, at Clwyd Theatr Cymru in 2010.
- Dave in the popular Channel 4 television sitcom The I.T. Crowd.
- Dr Keith Newby in BBC soap opera Doctors (2000 TV series) (BBC).
