= Robert Mosley (disambiguation) =

Robert Mosley (1927–2002) was an American bass-baritone opera singer.

Robert (Bob) Mosley may refer to:

- Bob Mosley (1942), American solo musical artist and bass player, vocalist and songwriter for the band Moby Grape
- Robert Mosley (pop musician), American singer, songwriter and producer
