= Jai Redman =

British artist

Jai Redman (born 1971) is a British artist who uses sculpture, painting, digital illustration and socially engaged public art. His work forms an "emotional and often satirical commentary on our dislocation from politics and the planet." He was responsible for This is Camp X-Ray in 2003, a reconstruction of an American detention facility; and had a retrospective exhibition at Manchester Art Gallery in 2016/17. His work is held in the collections of Manchester Art Gallery and the University of Salford.

== Life and work ==
Redman was born in Southampton and studied fine art at university in Reading. He took part in direct action against road building in the 1990s, first at Twyford Down, then at Jesmond Dene, Solsbury Hill, the M11 link road and the Newbury bypass.

His work forms an "emotional and often satirical commentary on our dislocation from politics and the planet."

Redman was creative director of Ultimate Holding Company (UHC), an arts collective in Manchester where he was responsible for This is Camp X-Ray in 2003 and, with Joseph Richardson, the ExtInked project in 2009.

This is Camp X-Ray was a working replica of part of the Camp X-Ray American detention facility at Guantanamo Bay in Cuba, on waste land in Hulme, Manchester. 9 volunteers—one for each of the 9 British prisoners believed to be detained at the camp—were "locked up" for 9 days and nights, under 24-hour surveillance. They were fed an unvarying diet of porridge, vegetable soup, beans and rice, and interrogated in sessions that were broadcast live on local radio.

ExtInked was a project to highlight the plight of endangered species in the UK. For Charles Darwin's bicentennial, Redman drew 100 endangered plants, animals, and fungi, each of which was listed as a priority on the UK's Biodiversity Action Plan—the government's conservation effort founded in response to the international Convention on Biological Diversity treaty. 100 people volunteered to have the drawings tattooed upon themselves, which took three tattoo artists four days to complete. All the volunteers were designated 'ambassadors' for their particular species, so as to create a collective of people who would share ideas about conservation. Portraits were taken of each participant with a 120-year-old view camera.

Engels' Beard is a public artwork created by Redman with Ian Brownbill at the University of Salford Peel Park campus, Greater Manchester, in 2016. The sculpture depicts the head of Friedrich Engels, with a climbing wall among the beard at the front, stairs to the rear and a viewing platform at the top. An excerpt from the poem "Thinker" by Jackie Kay is also included. Redman has said "Engels' Beard is not a monument; rather it is a metaphor for the effort and struggle needed to pull ourselves out of ignorance and a direct representation of how we all 'stand on the shoulder of giants'."

Jai Redman: Paradise Lost, a retrospective at Manchester Art Gallery in 2016/17, included oil paintings and watercolours.

Redman and his husband later moved from Manchester to Burnley where he set up and runs a café, One Sixty, which opened in March 2018. Also in 2018, he stood as a Green Party candidate in the Burnley Borough Council election.

== Publications ==
- Dongas Sketchbook: the Struggle for Twyford Down. Stroud: Gaia, 2021. Edited by James Brady. ISBN 9780993219283. Edition of 300 copies.

== Exhibitions, etc ==
=== Solo exhibitions and installations ===
- This is Camp X-Ray, Hulme, Manchester, 2003
- Jai Redman: Paradise Lost, Manchester Art Gallery, Manchester, 2016/17. A retrospective.

=== Group exhibitions ===
- We are extInked, Rugby Art Gallery and Museum, Rugby, 2012
- Primavera, Manchester After Hours, The Whitworth, Manchester, 2016. Part of Museums at Night.
- Hidden Revealed, Towneley Hall, Burnley, 2021/22

=== Public artworks ===
- Engels' Beard, University of Salford Peel Park campus, Greater Manchester, 2016–present. With Ian Brownbill.

== Collections ==
Redman's work is held in the following permanent collections:

- Manchester Art Gallery, Manchester: work from Paradise Lost
- University of Salford, Greater Manchester: Engels' Beard public artwork
