= Oral Cancer Foundation =

American non-profit organization

- Founded: 1999
- Founder: Brian Hill
- Region served: United States
- Method: Cancer research, public policy, education and service
- Website: oralcancerfoundation.org

The Oral Cancer Foundation, sometimes abbreviated to OCF, is an American, IRS-registered, 501(c)(3) non-profit organization, which focuses on oral and oropharyngeal cancer related issues and public awareness of the disease.

OCF funds medical research to aid the development of methods for early discovery and disease understanding. The foundation also offers direct peer to peer support for those suffering with the disease, along with caregivers. Breakthrough information is also provided to both the public and medical professionals to facilitate disease awareness, early discovery, and improve the quality and outcome of oral cancer treatment. It is engaged in advocacy related to these issues at the governmental level at the CDC, National Institutes of Health, FDA, and within the legislative branch itself.

== History ==
In 1997 Brian Hill was diagnosed with stage 4 squamous cell carcinoma. The late stage discovery, after twice being misdiagnosed, was made on his right tonsil, but had spread to the other side of his mouth and was also found in bilateral lymph nodes in his neck. Following treatment, Hill began a role of speaker and advocate of early discovery, speaking about what he had learned from his experiences. This role quickly became more formal and the decision was made that an entity would directly impact individuals, and bring different facets of the issue together so that a comprehensive impact could be made. The Oral Cancer Foundation was established in 1999 to accomplish these goals. Hill spoke publicly in The Wall Street Journal in 2004 about the importance of individuals recognizing symptoms of oral cancer. He was also profiled in a chapter in the book, Live Strong: Inspirational Stories from Cancer Survivors published by the Lance Armstrong Foundation about survivorship. In 2005, Hill was invited to speak at the World Health Organization's Oral Cancer Conference, which took place on the island of Crete, Greece, in 2005. The conference led to the creation of The Crete Declaration on Oral Cancer Prevention.

The foundation worked on developing relationships with high profile individuals who also had a connection to the disease. Out of many collaborative efforts, the most visible was the production of public service announcements that played on TV stations nationally in the United States. The first of these was a partnership with multi-Emmy Award winning actor Jack Klugman. Klugman was initially diagnosed in 1974 with cancer that took his voice and stopped his career for years. He stated that early detection had allowed him to survive and subsequently return to acting. In 2006, a public service announcement from Jack Klugman produced by OCF aired on US television, talking about tobacco use and the need for screening for oral cancers.

Another OCF partnership between multi Emmy and Tony award winning actress Blythe Danner (Paltrow). Her husband Bruce Paltrow died in 2002 from complications of his oral cancer treatments. The public service announcement, which spoke to his loss and how early discovery might have changed it, aired nationally on TV over three months and received 33 million viewer impressions. The personal relationship between Blythe Danner and her children, Gwyneth Paltrow, Jake Paltrow and the Oral Cancer Foundation began in 2005, and expanded into the formation of The Bruce Paltrow Oral Cancer Fund inside the umbrella of OCF in 2007.

Following his own cancer diagnosis, award-winning actor Michael Douglas partnered with OCF and agreed to front a cancer awareness campaign. As part of the campaign, Douglas was featured on a nationally televised PSA, which aired in the US in 2012. In the announcement, Douglas spoke of the need for regular screening and also recognizing the warning signs of oral cancer. The PSA was highly viewed with over 40 million viewer impressions. Douglas was featured in the media raising awareness of the links between oral sex and oral cancer, due to the spread of the human papillomavirus.

Colleen Zenk, known for her three-decade role on As the World Turns, partnered with OCF in 2007. As an oral cancer survivor, she appeared on morning TV talk shows raising awareness. She and the foundation also convinced the daytime TV show to write her cancer battle into the storyline, giving her condition public exposure, five days a week for four weeks on CBS. Zenk returned to the screen while her speech was still being impacted by her treatments, which created more awareness. Her recorded PSA gained the help of ATWT's TV channel CBS to run the piece for a month on their platform.

OCF has also collaborated with other celebrities and notable individuals on projects other than PSAs. Chris Martin, the lead singer of Coldplay, gave OCF items to auction off such as backstage meet and greet opportunities with the band during their Head Full of Dreams Tour in the US. The auction raised tens of thousands of dollars for the foundation. A similar relationship was struck with pop star Ziggy Marley. In March 2022 award-winning actor, producer, and writer Stanley Tucci was announced as an advisory board member for the Oral Cancer Foundation.

While celebrity attention dominated this period, Hill continued to be featured in the media explaining how a person can tell if their dentist is checking properly for cancer something that OCF has pressed the profession to be actively engaged in. He also raised awareness and featured in the Washingtonian and other publications that some oral cancers occur at the base of the tongue, and were caused by the same virus that causes cervical cancers.

== Statistics and research ==
The Oral Cancer Foundation is frequently used as a trusted source for figures and stats relating to oral cancer. In 2008, the foundation assisted with the funding of a peer-reviewed study into salivary biomarkers for oral cancer, focusing on oral squamous cell carcinoma. The study was published in Clinical Cancer Research and revealed that the use of subtractive proteomics helped understand how proteins in saliva differed between people with oral squamous cell carcinoma and those without. The hope was that the study would be used to help form better detection methods for oral cancer. It was one of several studies used for the development of non-invasive discovery and diagnosis of oral cancer ideas.

In 2010 a study into the connection between human papillomavirus and oral cancer survival rates was published in The New England Journal of Medicine. The research was co-sponsored by the Oral Cancer Foundation. Comparisons were made on treatment effectiveness, with each patient contacted over a five-year period. In 2012, further research was co-funded by the foundation in an attempt to understand etiologic fractions between the HPV virus and oral cancer development. Results were published in Oral Oncology. Continued funding with other partners explored the connection between HPV and oral cancer, and led to the publication in Genome Research of a genome-wide analysis of HPV's integration to human cancers, including oral.

Throughout 2015 OCF increased funding for peer-reviewed research, with eight separate studies taking place that year. In January 2015, research co-funded by Oral Cancer Foundation aimed to determine whether HPV DNA detection in oral rinses after treatment for HPV-OPC is associated with recurrence and survival. The peer-reviewed results in Genome Research suggested that oral rinses had the potential as a tool for long-term tumor surveillance. During the same month, OCF co-funded research into the study of a particular cell mutation connected with HPV, known as the NOTCH1 Mutation. OCF also co-funded a study to explore if tonsil removal played a role in reducing the risk of some oral cancers. The paper was published in Cancer Prevention Research and found that tonsil carcinoma significantly decreased when the patient had previously undergone a tonsillectomy procedure. A study into stage III/IV oral cancers found that surgical salvage increased survival rates in both HPV-positive and HPV-negative recurrent cancer patients.

== Other programs ==
=== Oral cancer screening ===
Since its creation the foundation has focused numerous campaigns on the various aspects of screening. From large free public screening events like those held in cooperation with USC, Walmart, and Procter & Gamble, to small screenings at local events, to partnerships with hundreds of dental offices across the country in April Oral Cancer Awareness Month each year to do free screenings for the public, screening has been a constant in OCF activities. Founder Brian Hill has spoken publicly since the creation of The Oral Cancer Foundation about the need for more accurate and effective oral cancer tests and screening. In 2015, OCF launched an initiative to get the public to self-screen between dental appointments and self-refer to dental doctors if anything abnormal was discovered. The Check Your Mouth program was launched, with its own dedicated website (www.checkyourmouth.org) to teach people to do this easily and properly.

=== HPV and HPV vaccine ===
As part of an information campaign stretching back over two decades, when the relationship of the virus and oropharyngeal cancer was first elucidated through the publication of work by an OCF board member and often research partner, Dr. Maura Gillison, OCF has frequently pushed to raise awareness for the need to increase vaccination rates in the United States for the HPV vaccine. Some of this work has been done in line with partnerships and collaborations, such as fundraising with the Bruce Paltrow Fund.

Following the breakthrough introduction of the HPV vaccine available to girls for cervical cancer in 2006, the foundation began to push publicly for the HPV vaccine to be made available to boys in the United States. Up until that point, the vaccine had been seen as a way to reduce cervical cancer rates, and for that reason was only offered to teenage girls. In August 2009, the Food and Drug Administration (FDA) announced males would for the first time be offered the HPV vaccine for boys aged 11 to 12 years old. It did not include oropharyngeal cancer as one of the reasons. For three years OCF engaged the CDC at the annual advisory committee on immunization practices (ACIP). That effort paid off in 2011 when public mentions of the vaccine's effectiveness against head and neck cancers was mentioned by the Centers for Disease Control and Prevention (CDC). This made vaccination of boys legally safe for providers to do.

OCF was one of the four original founding and funding members of HPV Action, a UK based HPV vaccine advocacy group that advocated and worked on policy changes in the UK that would allow the vaccination of boys to prevent persistent HPV infections. The group ultimately grew to 48 professional organizations in size. After many years of work to finally get approvals for the HPV vaccine to be used without preference to gender, the organization was disbanded as it had just that one successfully accomplished mission.

=== Anti-tobacco advocacy ===
The Oral Cancer Foundation has campaigned to raise awareness that tobacco use leads to an increase in oral cancers. Starting in 2007 OCF assisted Senator Ted Kennedy and his team in his efforts to regulate the tobacco industry in the United States. The US Senate ultimately passed legislation that allowed the FDA to control tobacco products. It was accomplished after Kennedy's death in 2009, when the Family Smoking Prevention and Tobacco Control Act was passed. In the run up to the bill going before the senate, Kennedy had focused his efforts on the harm tobacco did to the lungs and heart. It was not until Kennedy and Hill met and spoke of oral cancer that it was included as an issue adding weight to the bill. The move was seen as one of the biggest steps towards controlling tobacco use in the United States.

In 2014 OCF teamed up with rodeo cowboy, Cody Kiser, a bareback bronco rider, as part of an anti-tobacco effort targeting rural America. OCF became the first charity to exclusively sponsor a professional rodeo rider. Kiser, wearing branded gear was central to the campaign "Be Smart Don't Start", which was aimed at reaching out to young adults in rural America about tobacco use, and understanding the risks. After competing in the arena, he met with young kids to sign autographs and talk about not needing tobacco to be successful in the sport. OCF also began doing screenings for adults at rodeos at the same time.

=== Public awareness events ===
OCF puts on numerous public walk/run events around the country each year as a mechanism to raise awareness of oral cancer in major cities. Starting in 2005, in cooperation with dental schools like NYU and others, the community of registered dental hygienists (RDHs), patient survivor families, and members of the dental community acting as on the ground volunteer coordinators, not only is awareness raised, but free public screenings and after 2015 free HPV vaccinations are provided to attendees who desire them. Over more than a decade and a half of multi-location awareness and fundraising events have seen thousands of people attend annually, and hundreds of thousands of dollars have been raised to fund OCF research endeavors and other missions.

== Patient support ==
=== Online support community ===
One of the first major milestones of the OCF was to create an online support community for those suffering with oral cancer. The foundation was the first to provide online support in this way, and is now (2022) at almost 13,000 members, making it one of the largest cancer support groups online.

According to interviews and OCF information gleaned from the actual support group postings, the OCF online community pre-dated even the advent of social media companies such as Facebook that were years away from existing. Posts and information from the group have been used as a source in science articles looking at the patient experience. The group is anonymous and free providing a safe environment to discuss the most intimate details of the cancer journey physically and emotionally.

=== Eating difficulties ===
Patients treated for oral cancer can end up after treatments unable to eat or drink by mouth in many cases, ultimately forced to eat through a stomach feeding tube (PEG) or be limited to drinking blended smoothies and eating no solid food. OCF announced over a decade ago that they would be helping survivors with lifelong swallowing complications (dysphagia) from oral cancer, and a documented financial disparity, by giving away blenders so patients could continue healthy diets while suffering with problems.

This is an expensive program to maintain as these machines cost several hundreds of dollars each. OCF ultimately partnered with blender manufacturer Vitamix to buy blenders at a discount for the program.
