= The Least Worst Place =

2009 book by Karen Greenberg

First edition (publ. Oxford University Press)

The Least Worst Place: How Guantanamo Became the World's Most Notorious Prison is a 2009 book about the first several months of the operation of the Guantanamo Bay detention camps, in Cuba. The book's author, Karen J. Greenberg is Director of the Center on National Security at Fordham University's School of Law, and the author or co-author of several books on the George W. Bush Presidency's captive policies.

The book tracks the camps' opening, the confusion as to whether the captives were to be treated according to the Geneva Conventions. Brigadier General Michael Lehnert, the commander of the original task force, joint task force 160, had allowed representatives of the International Committee of the Red Cross to meet with the captives, and introduced other policies at odds with the plans of the leadership of the Bush Presidency.

The books chronicles the creation of a second joint task force -- joint task force 170, to handle the captive's interrogation. Within a few months the two task forces were amalgamated into Joint Task Force Guantanamo, commanded by a series of two star officers.
