= The Torture Papers =

The Torture Papers may refer to:

- The Torture Papers (book), a book about the use of controversial techniques in the interrogation and detention of captives of the US
- The Torture Papers (album), the 2006 debut album from Hip Hop collective Army of the Pharaohs
