= Rick Baccus =

United States Army general

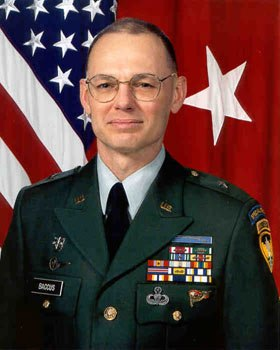
- Brigadier General Baccus, Former Commander of Joint Task Force 160
- Born: August 30, 1952 (age 74)
- Military career
- Allegiance: United States
- Branch: United States Army
- Service years: 1974–2002
- Rank: Brigadier General
- Commands: 43rd Military Police Brigade; Joint Task Force 160 (JTF-GTMO)
- Conflicts: Operation Enduring Freedom

Rick Baccus (born August 30, 1952) is a retired Army National Guard Brigadier General. Baccus received a regular Army commission in 1974 as an Infantry Officer through the Reserve Officers Training Corps (ROTC) program and immediately entered active duty. He is most noted for commanding the Guantanamo Bay detention facility at Guantanamo Bay, Cuba in 2002.

== Military career ==
After serving four years on active duty with the U.S. Army, Baccus became a full-time staff officer with the Rhode Island Army National Guard. He held various positions, mostly related to operations and logistics, and was selected as the United States Property and Fiscal Officer for Rhode Island in June 1999. In this position he was responsible for accounting for all funds and equipment held by the Rhode Island National Guard.

He was appointed commanding officer of the 43rd Military Police Brigade in 2001 and promoted to brigadier general at the same time. Late in 2001, the Headquarters and Headquarters Company of the 43rd MP Brigade was selected to become the command element of Joint Task Force 160 to oversee detention operations at Guantanamo Bay.

== Guantanamo Bay ==
On March 28, 2002, Baccus took command of Joint Task Force 160 where he was the head of the Military Police at Camp X-Ray in Guantanamo Bay, Cuba. In April 2002, a new detention facility named Camp Delta was opened at Guantanamo and all detainees were transferred there.

Baccus was removed from his post less than 7 months later. The US Army said General Baccus had been replaced on October 9, 2002, as part of a reorganization of Camp Delta.

Major General Reginald Centracchio, Adjutant General of the Rhode Island National Guard, told the Washington Post that he stripped General Baccus of his duties as head of military police because he had lost trust and confidence in Baccus as a commander. However, in a Frontline interview that aired on August 27, 2005, General Baccus responded to a question relating to his "being sacked" in this manner:

Baccus: "Well, first of all, any reports of my being sacked are absolutely untrue. I was awarded the Defense Superior Service Medal for my time frame at Guantanamo. I was given an outstanding officer evaluation report upon my leaving. And as you may be aware, Joint Task Force 160 was given the Joint Unit Meritorious Award for their time period in Guantanamo, of which I was the commander of that joint task force seven out of the nine months in the period of time of the award. So to say that I was sacked, I think, is a falsified impression placed in the press by the usual "unnamed sources" that refuse to come forward. ...".
Baccus: …Within several days after I left, that's when they [the Military Intelligence team] floated the first memo about how they wanted to operate differently."
Frontline: "And what was that? "
Baccus: "That is what I read in the [Gen. Randall M.] Schmidt report, but that's the one where they suggested they have other means [by] which to interrogate the detainees. "
…The question is whether or not if we do [things allowed by the Schmidt report] to a detainee, are we willing to have somebody else do that to an American? If that's acceptable in our country, then fine. If not, then we need to rethink about what we're doing."

Following Baccus' departure from Guantanamo Bay, Secretary of Defense Donald Rumsfeld gave the Military Intelligence Team control over the Military Police and all aspects of Camp X-Ray and, later, Camp Delta. Major General Geoffrey Miller was appointed commander.

== Later career ==
General Baccus retired from the National Guard on December 5, 2002, shortly after his return from Guantanamo Bay. He was later employed as the administrator of the Rhode Island Veterans Home, overseeing the construction of an entirely new $73 million facility which opened in November 2017. Baccus resigned as administrator of the Veterans Home in January 2020 amid controversies about the facility's budget.

Baccus is a highly active Freemason. In May 2025 he was elected as the 170th Grand Master of the Grand Lodge of Rhode Island.

== Education ==
- 1974 Eastern Michigan University - BS Degree - Mathematics
- 1990 University of Rhode Island - MBA
- 1992 U.S. Army War College

== Former assignments ==
- Apr 90 - Aug 92, Chief, Plans, Operations, and Military Support Division, State Area Command, Providence, Rhode Island
- Aug 92 - Jun 96, Director of Personnel, State Area Command, Providence, Rhode Island
- Jul 96 - May 99, Supervisory Logistics Management Specialist and Assistant United States Property and Fiscal Officer for Rhode Island, Providence, Rhode Island
- Jun 99 - Mar 01, United States Property and Fiscal Officer, National Guard Bureau, with duty at Providence, Rhode Island
- Mar 01 – Dec 02, Commander, 43rd Military Police Brigade, Warwick, Rhode Island
- Mar 02 - Oct 02, Commander, Joint Task Force 160, Guantanamo Bay, Cuba, Operation Enduring Freedom

== Military decorations and awards ==
- Defense Superior Service Medal
- Legion of Merit
- Meritorious Service Medal with three oak leaf clusters (4 Awards)
- Army Commendation Medal with three oak leaf clusters (4 Awards)
- Army Achievement Medal with one oak leaf cluster (2 Awards)
- Joint Meritorious Unit Award
- Army Reserve Component Achievement Medal with one silver oak leaf cluster (6 Awards)
- National Defense Service Medal with two stars (3 Awards)
- Global War on Terrorism Expeditionary Medal
- Global War on Terrorism Service Medal
- Armed Forces Reserve Medal with silver hour glass and "M" device
- Army Service Ribbon
- Army Reserve Components Overseas Training Ribbon
- Rhode Island Star with two oak leaf clusters (3 Awards)
- Rhode Island Commendation Medal
- Rhode Island Gubernatorial Unit Citation
- Rhode Island Defense Service Medal with oak leaf cluster
- Rhode Island National Guard Service Medal with two "X" devices
- Expert Infantryman Badge
- Master Parachutist Badge
- Pathfinder Badge
- ARNG Recruiter Badge
- German Parachutist Badge (Bronze)
- Ranger Tab
- Special Forces Tab

== Dates of rank ==
- 2LT, AUS - 29 Apr 74
- 2LT, RA - 5 Jun 74
- 1LT, AUS - 29 Apr 76
- CPT, AUS - 13 Jun 78
- CPT, USAR - 1 Aug 78
- CPT, ARNG - 8 Aug 78
- MAJ, ARNG - 8 Sep 83
- LTC, ARNG - 1 Aug 88
- COL, ARNG - 22 Aug 92
- BG, ARNG - 7 Mar 01
