= The Good Night =

- The Good Night Promotional Movie Poster (United States)
- Directed by: Jake Paltrow
- Written by: Jake Paltrow
- Produced by: Donna Gigliotti; William J. Johnson
- Starring: Martin Freeman; Penélope Cruz; Gwyneth Paltrow; Simon Pegg; Danny DeVito
- Cinematography: Giles Nuttgens
- Edited by: Rick Lawley
- Music by: Alec Puro
- Production company: Inferno International
- Distributed by: Yari Film Group; Destination Films
- Release dates: January 25, 2007 (Sundance Film Festival); October 5, 2007 (United States)
- Running time: 93 min
- Countries: United Kingdom; United States
- Language: English
- Budget: $15 million
- Box office: $508,084

The Good Night is a 2007 fantasy comedy-drama film written and directed by Jake Paltrow. The film stars his sister Gwyneth Paltrow, Penélope Cruz, Martin Freeman, Danny DeVito, Simon Pegg and others.

The movie takes place in London and New York City, where former pop star Gary Shaller, who now writes commercial jingles for a living, experiences a mid-life crisis.

The movie was released on the 2007 Sundance Film Festival, later had a limited theatrical release, and was a box office bomb.

== Plot ==
The film follows a man's search for perfection in a world where life rarely measures up to the idealized images that constantly bombard us.

Gary Shaller, who gained commercial success in the past as the keyboard player in the band "On the One", is in a failing relationship with Dora, and working for his former bandmate Paul, writing and recording commercial jingles. Gary is having lucid dreams about a woman named Anna, with whom he is deeply infatuated. He learns more about lucid dreaming by buying books and attending classes taught by lucid-dreaming guru Mel.

Gary eventually discovers that the girl he dreams about does, in fact, exist. Paul arranges for Gary to meet her, but this proves disappointing, as she fails to live up to the expectations that Gary has built up in his dreams of her. He eventually continues to dream about her, even soundproofs his apartment, and makes other efforts to be able to sleep longer, so that he can remain with Anna for longer periods of time.

Eventually, after a final dream with Anna in which he performs an original score he has written for Dora, Gary cleans up his life. Removing the blackout cloth and soundproofing from his bedroom windows, he cleans up the apartment. Gary makes a demo of the score, bringing it to Dora's gallery opening. He just misses her, so attempts to follow her out. While crossing the street to reach Dora, Gary is hit by a car. As the movie ends, he is fully immersed in his dream world, apparently while being in a coma in the hospital.

== Cast ==
- Martin Freeman as Gary Shaller
- Gwyneth Paltrow as Dora Shaller
- Penélope Cruz as Anna
- Danny DeVito as Mel
- Simon Pegg as Paul
- Michael Gambon as Alan Weigert
- Keith Allen as Norman
- Jarvis Cocker as Himself
- Amanda Abbington as Vivian
- Stephen Graham as Victor
- Lucy DeVito (uncredited)

== Production ==
The production filmed at Capel Manor Guest Pavilion in Kent to shoot the scenes at the house in Gary's dreams where he meets Anna.

== Reception ==
On the review aggregator website Rotten Tomatoes, 30% of 43 critics' reviews are positive. The website's consensus reads: "That The Good Night is the work of a first-time writer/director is apparent, as the story feels disjointed and never connects with the audience."
