= Blythe Danner =

American actress (born 1943)

- Danner in 2026
- Born: Blythe Katherine Danner; February 3, 1943 (age 83); Philadelphia, Pennsylvania, U.S.
- Education: Bard College
- Occupation: Actress
- Years active: 1965–present
- Spouse: Bruce Paltrow (m. 1969; died 2002)
- Children: Gwyneth Paltrow; Jake Paltrow
- Relatives: Harry Danner (brother); Katherine Moennig (niece); Apple Martin (granddaughter)

Blythe Katherine Danner (born February 3, 1943) is an American actress. Accolades she has received include two Primetime Emmy Awards for Best Supporting Actress in a Drama Series for her role as Izzy Huffstodt on Huff (2004–2006), and a Tony Award for Best Featured Actress in a Play for her performance in Butterflies Are Free on Broadway (1969–1972). Danner was twice nominated for the Primetime Emmy for Outstanding Guest Actress in a Comedy Series for portraying Marilyn Truman on Will & Grace (2001–06; 2018–20), and the Primetime Emmy for Outstanding Lead Actress in a Miniseries or Movie for her roles in We Were the Mulvaneys (2002) and Back When We Were Grownups (2004). For the latter, she also received a Golden Globe Award nomination.

Danner played Dina Byrnes in the Meet the Parents film series (2000-present). She has collaborated on several occasions with Woody Allen, appearing in three of his films: Another Woman (1988), Alice (1990), and Husbands and Wives (1992). Her other notable film credits include 1776 (1972), Hearts of the West (1975), The Great Santini (1979), Mr. & Mrs. Bridge (1990), The Prince of Tides (1991), To Wong Foo, Thanks for Everything! Julie Newmar (1995), The Myth of Fingerprints (1997), The X-Files (1998), Forces of Nature (1999), The Love Letter (1999), The Last Kiss (2006), Paul (2011), Hello I Must Be Going (2012), I'll See You in My Dreams (2015), and What They Had (2018).

Danner is the sister of Harry Danner and the widow of Bruce Paltrow.

== Early life ==
Danner was born in Philadelphia, Pennsylvania, to Katharine and Harry Earl Danner, a bank executive. She has a brother, opera singer and actor Harry Danner, a sister and a maternal half-brother. Danner has Pennsylvania Dutch, some English and Irish ancestry. Her maternal grandmother was a German immigrant, and one of her paternal great-grandmothers was born in Barbados to a family of European descent. Danner graduated from George School, a Quaker high school located near Newtown, Bucks County, Pennsylvania, in 1960.

== Career ==
A graduate of Bard College, Danner's first roles included the 1967 musical Mata Hari and the 1968 Off-Broadway production of Summertree. Her early Broadway appearances included Cyrano de Bergerac (1968) and her Theatre World Award-winning performance in The Miser (1969). She won the Tony Award for Best Featured Actress in a Play for portraying a free-spirited divorcée in Butterflies Are Free (1970).

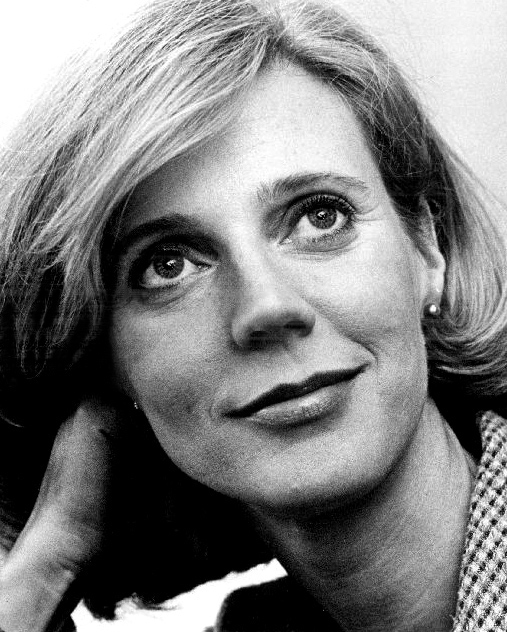
Danner in 1980

In 1972, Danner portrayed Martha Jefferson, opposite Ken Howard as Thomas Jefferson, in the film version of 1776. That same year, she played Janice Benedict, the wife of an unfaithful husband who murders his lover, played by John Cassavetes, in the Columbo episode "Étude in Black". Danner was five months pregnant with her daughter, Gwyneth Paltrow, during production of the episode and her baby bump was visible in several scenes.

Her earliest starring film role was opposite Alan Alda in To Kill a Clown (1972). Danner appeared in the episode of M*A*S*H entitled "The More I See You", playing the love interest of Alda's character Hawkeye Pierce. She played lawyer Amanda Bonner in television's Adam's Rib, again opposite Howard as Adam Bonner. She played Zelda Fitzgerald in F. Scott Fitzgerald and 'The Last of the Belles' (1974). She was the eponymous heroine in the film Lovin' Molly (1974) (directed by Sidney Lumet). She appeared in Futureworld, playing Tracy Ballard with co-star Peter Fonda (1976). In the 1982 TV movie Inside the Third Reich, she played the wife of Albert Speer. In the film version of Neil Simon's semi-autobiographical play Brighton Beach Memoirs (1986), she portrayed a middle-aged Jewish mother. She has appeared in two films based on the novels of Pat Conroy, The Great Santini (1979) and The Prince of Tides (1991), as well as two television movies adapted from books by Anne Tyler, Saint Maybe and Back When We Were Grownups, both for the Hallmark Hall of Fame.

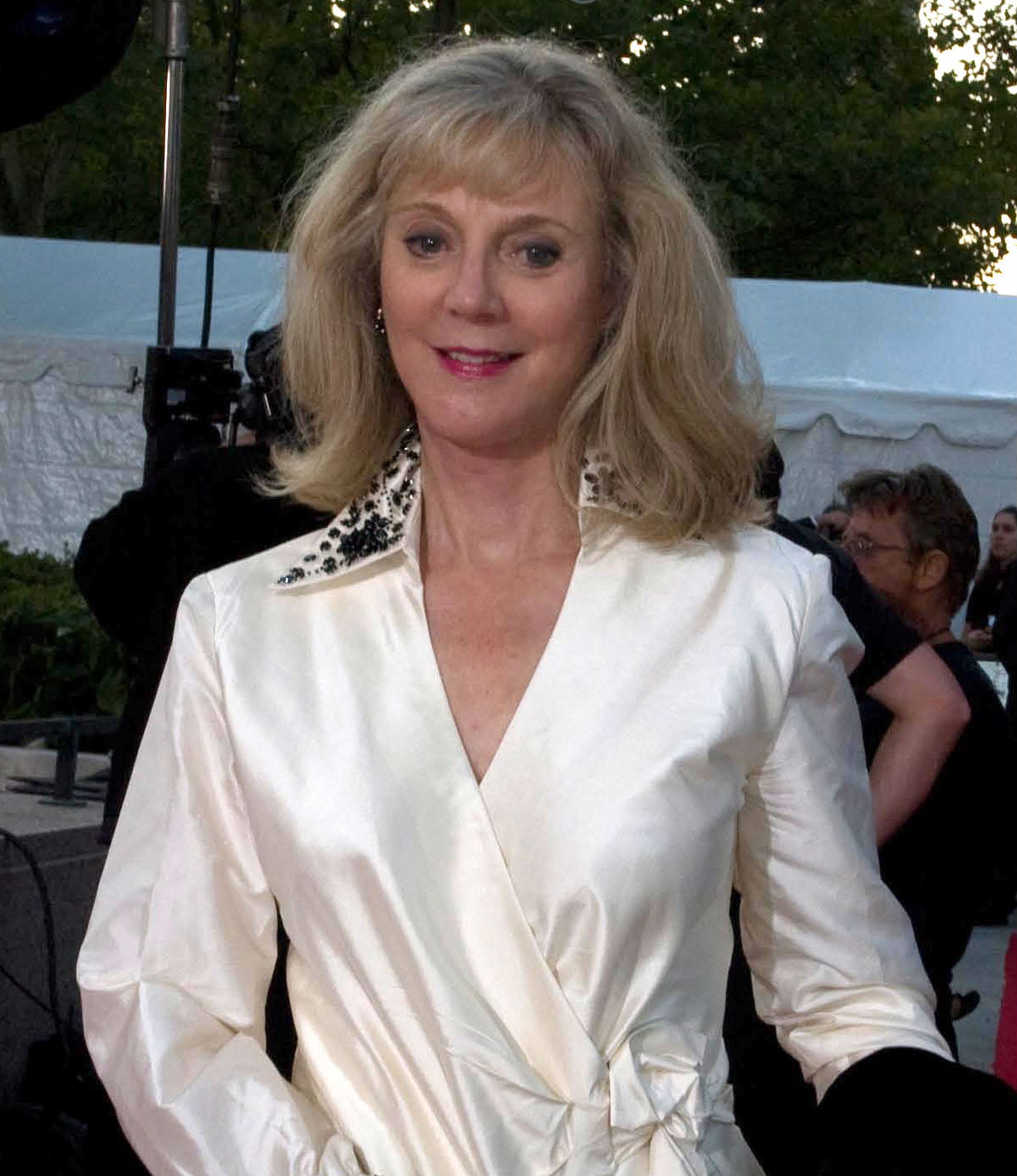
Danner at the Metropolitan Opera opening, September 22, 2008

Danner appeared opposite Robert De Niro in the 2000 comedy hit Meet the Parents, and its sequels, Meet the Fockers (2004) and Little Fockers (2010). On May 30, 2025, it was announced that Danner would return for a fourth film which is scheduled to release on November 25, 2026.

From 2001 to 2006, she regularly appeared on NBC's sitcom Will & Grace as Will Truman's mother Marilyn. From 2004 to 2006, she starred in the main cast of the comedy-drama series Huff. In 2005, she was nominated for three Primetime Emmy Awards for her work on Will & Grace, Huff, and the television film Back When We Were Grownups, winning for her role in Huff. The following year, she won a second consecutive Emmy Award for Huff. For 25 years, she has been a regular performer at the Williamstown Summer Theater Festival, where she also serves on the board of directors.

In 2006, Danner was awarded an inaugural Katharine Hepburn Medal by Bryn Mawr College's Katharine Houghton Hepburn Center. In 2015, Danner was inducted into the American Theater Hall of Fame.

== Environmental activism ==
Danner has been involved in environmental issues such as recycling and conservation for over 30 years. She has been active with INFORM, Inc., is on the Board of Environmental Advocates of New York and the board of directors of the Environmental Media Association, and won the 2002 EMA Board of Directors Ongoing Commitment Award. In 2011, Danner joined Moms Clean Air Force, to help call on parents to join in the fight against toxic air pollution.

== Health care activism ==
After the death of her husband Bruce Paltrow from oral cancer, she became involved with the nonprofit Oral Cancer Foundation. In 2005, she filmed a public service announcement to raise public awareness of the disease and the need for early detection. She has since appeared on morning talk shows and given interviews in such magazines as People. The Bruce Paltrow Oral Cancer Fund, administered by the Oral Cancer Foundation, raises funding for oral cancer research and treatment, with a particular focus on those communities in which healthcare disparities exist.

She has also appeared in commercials for Prolia, a brand of denosumab used in the treatment of osteoporosis.

== Personal life ==
Danner was married to producer and director Bruce Paltrow, who died of oral cancer in 2002. She and Paltrow had two children together, actress Gwyneth Paltrow and director Jake Paltrow.

Danner's niece is the actress Katherine Moennig, the daughter of her maternal half-brother William.

Danner co-starred with her daughter in the 1992 television film Cruel Doubt and again in the 2003 film Sylvia, in which she portrayed Aurelia Plath, mother to Gwyneth's title role of Sylvia Plath.

Danner is a practitioner of transcendental meditation, which she has described as "very helpful and comforting".

== Acting credits ==
=== Film ===
Key
†	Denotes films that have not yet been released

Year	Title	Role	Notes
1972	To Kill a Clown	Lily Frischer	
1972	1776	Martha Jefferson	
1974	Lovin' Molly	Molly Taylor	
1975	Hearts of the West	Miss Trout	
1976	Futureworld	Tracy Ballard	
1979	The Great Santini	Lillian Meechum	
1983	Inside the Third Reich	Margarete Speer	
1983	Man, Woman and Child	Sheila Beckwith	
1985	Guilty Conscience	Louise Jamison	
1986	Brighton Beach Memoirs	Kate Jerome	
1988	Another Woman	Lydia	
1990	Mr. & Mrs. Bridge	Grace Barron	
1990	Alice	Dorothy Smith	
1991	The Prince of Tides	Sally Wingo	
1992	Husbands and Wives	Rain's Mother	
1995	Napoleon	Mother Dingo	
1995	Homage	Katherine Samuel	
1995	To Wong Foo, Thanks for Everything! Julie Newmar	Beatrice	
1997	The Myth of Fingerprints	Lena	
1997	Mad City	Mrs. Banks	
1998	The Proposition	Syril Danning	
1998	No Looking Back	Claudia's Mother	
1998	The X-Files	Jana Cassidy	
1999	Forces of Nature	Virginia Cahill	
1999	The Love Letter	Lillian MacFarquhar	
1999	Things I Forgot to Remember	Mrs. Bradford	
2000	Meet the Parents	Dina Byrnes	
2001	The Invisible Circus	Gail O'Connor	
2003	Three Days of Rain	Woman in Cab	
2003	Sylvia	Aurelia Plath	
2004	Howl's Moving Castle	Madam Suliman	Voice role; English dub
2004	Meet the Fockers	Dina Byrnes	
2006	Stolen	Isabella Stewart Gardner	
2006	The Last Kiss	Anna	
2008	The Sisterhood of the Traveling Pants 2	Greta Randolph	
2009	Waiting for Forever	Miranda Twist	
2009	Beyond All Boundaries	Elsa Maxwell	Voice; Documentary
2009	The Lightkeepers	Mrs. Bascom	
2010	Little Fockers	Dina Byrnes	
2011	Paul	Tara Walton	
2011	What's Your Number?	Ava Darling	
2011	Detachment	Mrs. Perkins	
2012	The Lucky One	Ellie Green	
2012	Hello I Must Be Going	Ruth Minsky	
2014	Murder of a Cat	Edie Moisey	
2015	I'll See You in My Dreams	Carol Petersen	
2015	Tumbledown	Linda Jespersen	
2018	What They Had	Ruth O’Shea	
2018	Hearts Beat Loud	Marianne Fisher	
2018	The Chaperone	Mary O'Dell	
2019	The Tomorrow Man	Ronnie Meisner	
2019	Strange but True	Gail Erwin	
2023	Happiness for Beginners	Gigi	
2026	Wildwood	The Seer	Voice role
2026	Focker-in-Law †	Dina Byrnes	Post-production

=== Television ===
Year	Title	Role	Notes
1970	George M!	Agnes Nolan Cohan	TV movie
1971	Dr. Cook's Garden	Janey Rausch	TV movie
1972	Columbo	Janice Benedict	Episode: "Etude in Black"
1973	Adam's Rib	Amanda Bonner	Main cast
1974	F. Scott Fitzgerald and 'The Last of the Belles'	Zelda Fitzgerald	TV movie
1974	Sidekicks	Prudy Jenkins	TV movie
1975	Great Performances	Nina Zarechnaya	Episode: "The Seagull"
1976	M*A*S*H	Carlye Breslin Walton	Episode: "The More I See You"
1976	A Love Affair: The Eleanor and Lou Gehrig Story	Eleanor Twitchell Gehrig	TV movie
1976	Great Performances	Alma Winemiller	Episode: "Eccentricites of a Nightingale"
1977	The Court-Martial of George Armstrong Custer	Mrs. Custer	TV movie
1978	Are You in the House Alone?	Anne Osbourne	TV movie
1979	Too Far to Go	Joan Barlow Maple	TV movie
1979	You Can't Take It with You	Alice Sycamore	TV movie
1982	Inside the Third Reich	Margarete Speer	TV movie
1982	Saturday Night Live	Guest host	Episode: "Blythe Danner / Rickie Lee Jones"
1983	In Defense of Kids	Ellen Wilcox	TV movie
1984	Guilty Conscience	Louise Jamison	TV movie
1984	Helen Keller: The Miracle Continues	Anne Sullivan	TV movie
1988–1989	Tattingers	Hillary Tattinger	Main cast
1989	Money, Power, Murder	Jeannie	TV movie
1990	Judgment	Emmeline Guitry	TV movie
1992	Getting Up and Going Home	Lily	TV movie
1992	Cruel Doubt	Bonnie Van Stein	TV movie
1992	Tales from the Crypt	Margaret	Episode: "Maniac at Large"
1992	Lincoln	Elizabeth Todd Edwards	TV movie
1993	Tracey Ullman Takes on New York	Eleanor Levine	TV movie
1993	Great Performances	Narrator	Episode: "The Maestros of Philadelphia"
1994	Oldest Living Confederate Widow Tells All	Bianca Honicut	TV movie
1994	Leave of Absence	Elisa	TV movie
1997	Thomas Jefferson	Martha Jefferson	TV movie
1997	A Call to Remember	Paula Tobias	TV movie
1998	From the Earth to the Moon	Narrator	Miniseries, episode: "Le voyage dans la lune"
1998	Saint Maybe	Bee Bedloe	TV movie
1998	Murder She Purred: A Mrs. Murphy Mystery	Mrs. Murphy	TV movie
2001–2006, 2018–2020	Will & Grace	Marilyn Truman	Recurring role (seasons 4, 6–11)
2002	We Were the Mulvaneys	Corinne Mulvaney	TV movie
2002	Presidio Med	Dr. Harriet Lanning	3 episodes
2003	Two and a Half Men	Evelyn Harper	Episode: "Most Chicks Won't Eat Veal" (unaired pilot)
2004	Back When We Were Grownups	Rebecca Holmes Davitch	TV movie
2004–2006	Huff	Isabelle Huffstodt	Main cast
2009	Medium	Louise Leaming	Episode: "A Taste of Her Own Medicine"
2009	Nurse Jackie	Maureen Cooper	Episode: "Tiny Bubbles"
2011–2012	Up All Night	Dr. Angie Chafin	3 episodes
2015	The Slap	Virginia Latham	Episode: "Anouk"
2016	Madoff	Ruth Madoff	Miniseries, main cast
2016	Odd Mom Out	Jill's Mom	Episode: "Fasting and Furious"
2017	Gypsy	Nancy	Recurring role
2018	Patrick Melrose	Nancy Valance	Miniseries
2021	American Gods	Demeter	2 episodes
2021–2023	Ridley Jones	Sylvia Jones (voice)	Recurring role

=== Stage ===
Year	Title	Role	Venue	Refs.
1965	The Glass Menagerie	Laura Wingfield	Theater Company of Boston	
1967	Three Sisters	Irina Prozorova	Trinity Square Playhouse	
1968	Cyrano de Bergerac	Sister Marthe	Vivian Beaumont Theater	
1968	Up Eden	Violet Beam	Jan Hus Playhouse Theater	
1968	Lovers	Margaret Mary Enright	Vivian Beaumont Theater	
1969	Someone's Comin' Hungry	Connie Odum	Pocket Theatre	
1969	The Miser	Elise	Vivian Beaumont Theater	
1969–1972	Butterflies Are Free	Jill Tanner	Booth Theatre	
1971	Major Barbara	Barbara Undershaft	Mark Taper Forum	
1972	Twelfth Night	Viola	Vivian Beaumont Theater	
1974	The Seagull	Nina Zarechnaya	Williamstown Theatre Festival	
1975	Ring Round the Moon	Isabelle	Williamstown Theatre Festival	
1977	The New York Idea	Cynthia Karslake	Brooklyn Academy of Music	
1979	Children of the Sun	Lisa	Williamstown Theatre Festival	
1980	Betrayal	Emma	Trafalgar Theatre	
1980–1981	The Philadelphia Story	Tracy Samantha Lord	Vivian Beaumont Theater	
1987	Blithe Spirit	Elvira Condomine	Neil Simon Theatre	
1988	Much Ado About Nothing	Beatrice	Delacorte Theater	
1988	A Streetcar Named Desire	Blanche DuBois	Circle in the Square Theatre	
1989	Love Letters	Melissa Gardner	Promenade Theatre	
1991	Picnic	Rosemary Sydney	Williamstown Theatre Festival	
1994	The Seagull	Irina Arkadina	Williamstown Theatre Festival	
1995	Sylvia	Kate	New York City Center	
1995–1996	Moonlight	Bel	Laura Pels Theatre	
1998	The Deep Blue Sea	Hester Collyer	Criterion Center Stage Right	
2000	Tonight at 8.30	Jane Featherways	Williamstown Theatre Festival	
2001	Follies	Phyllis Rogers Stone	Belasco Theatre	
2002	Carousel	Mrs. Mullin	Carnegie Hall	
2003	All About Eve	Karen Richards	Ahmanson Theatre	
2006	Suddenly Last Summer	Violet Venable	Laura Pels Theatre	
2012–2013	Nice Work If You Can Get It	Millicent Winter	Imperial Theatre	
2014	The Country House	Anna Paterson	Samuel J. Friedman Theatre	

== Awards and nominations ==
Year	Nominated work	Award	Result
1969	The Miser	Theatre World Award	Won
1970	Butterflies Are Free	Tony Award for Best Featured Actress in a Play	Won
1976	Futureworld	Saturn Award for Best Actress	Won
1977	The New York Idea	Drama Desk Award for Outstanding Actress in a Play	Nominated
1980	Betrayal	Tony Award for Best Actress in a Play	Nominated
1980	Betrayal	Drama Desk Award for Outstanding Actress in a Play	Nominated
1988	A Streetcar Named Desire	Tony Award for Best Actress in a Play	Nominated
2001	Follies	Tony Award for Best Actress in a Musical	Nominated
2002	We Were the Mulvaneys	Primetime Emmy Award for Outstanding Lead Actress in a Miniseries or a Movie	Nominated
2004	Back When We Were Grownups	Golden Globe Award for Best Actress – Miniseries or Television Film	Nominated
2004	Back When We Were Grownups	Primetime Emmy Award for Outstanding Lead Actress in a Miniseries or a Movie	Nominated
2005	Huff	Primetime Emmy Award for Outstanding Supporting Actress in a Drama Series	Won
2005	Will & Grace	Primetime Emmy Award for Outstanding Guest Actress in a Comedy Series	Nominated
2006	Huff	Primetime Emmy Award for Outstanding Supporting Actress in a Drama Series	Won
2006	Suddenly Last Summer	Drama Desk Award for Outstanding Actress in a Play	Nominated
2006	Will & Grace	Primetime Emmy Award for Outstanding Guest Actress in a Comedy Series	Nominated
2006	The Last Kiss	Satellite Award for Best Supporting Actress – Motion Picture	Nominated
2015	I'll See You in My Dreams	Gotham Award for Best Actress	Nominated
2015	I'll See You in My Dreams	Satellite Award for Best Actress – Motion Picture	Nominated
