= The Jackdaw =

British arts magazine

- Cover of the September–October 2020 issue
- Editor: David Lee
- Categories: Art
- Frequency: 6 times a year
- First issue: 2000
- Country: United Kingdom
- Based in: London
- Language: English
- Website: Jackdaw
- ISSN: 1474-3914

The Jackdaw is a British arts magazine, published since 2000 in London, United Kingdom.

== History and profile ==
The Jackdaw was founded by art critic David Lee in 2000. He is also the editor of the magazine, which is critical of the art world, and publishes articles that are both informative and polemical. The magazine has its headquarters in London.
