= Jake Paltrow =

American film director, screenwriter and actor

- Born: September 26, 1975 (age 51); Los Angeles, California, U.S.
- Occupation: Film director
- Spouse: Taryn Simon (m. 2010)
- Children: 2
- Parent(s): Bruce Paltrow; Blythe Danner
- Relatives: Gwyneth Paltrow (sister); Harry Danner (uncle); Apple Martin (niece); Katherine Moennig (half-cousin); Rebekah Neumann (cousin); Gabby Giffords (second cousin)

Jake Paltrow (born September 26, 1975) is an American film director, screenwriter and actor. Coming from a family of actors, he is the younger brother of Gwyneth Paltrow and the son of Bruce Paltrow and Blythe Danner.

== Personal life ==
Paltrow is the son of producer-director Bruce Paltrow and actress Blythe Danner.

His father is Jewish and had a Bar Mitzvah.

He is a half first cousin of actress Katherine Moennig and a second cousin of former U.S. congresswoman Gabby Giffords.

In 1999, Paltrow met photographer and artist Taryn Simon, whom he married in 2010; they have two children together.

== Career ==
Paltrow began his career in television directing some NYPD Blue episodes, such as: Andy Appleseed (2003), Brothers Under Arms (2000) and Big Bang Theory (1999), following in his father's footsteps as a television director.

In 2006, he made his debut as a film director with the movie The Good Night, which featured his sister Gwyneth. The movie was released at the 2007 Sundance Film Festival. Paltrow has produced short films about actors for the New York Times. In 2014, he wrote, directed and produced the dystopian sci-fi Western Young Ones.

== Filmography ==
Film
Year	Title	Director	Writer	Producer	Notes
2007	The Good Night	Yes	Yes	No	
2010	Greenberg	No	No	No	appeared as Johno
2014	Young Ones	Yes	Yes	Yes	
2015	De Palma	Yes	No	Yes	Documentary; Co-directed with Noah Baumbach
2022	June Zero	Yes	Yes	No	

Television
Year	Title	Director	Notes
1996	High Incident	Yes	two episodes
1997–2004	NYPD Blue	Yes	Ten episodes
2000	The Others	Yes	one episode
2004	The Jury	Yes	one episode
2013–2014	Boardwalk Empire	Yes	"White Horse Pike" "Cuanto"
2016	Halt and Catch Fire	Yes	one episode
