= The Free Lance =

1905 operetta by John Philip Sousa

- Opera by John Philip Sousa
- Title page of the vocal score to The Free Lance by Sousa.
- Librettist: Harry B. Smith
- Premiere: March 26, 1906; Springfield, Massachusetts

The Free Lance is an operetta composed in 1905 by John Philip Sousa and libretto by Harry B. Smith. It premiered on March 26, 1906 at the Court Square Theater in Springfield, Massachusetts.

The complete libretto has been transcribed for easier reading by Arthur O’Dwyer (2025) here.

== Productions ==
After the premiere run in Massachusetts, the original Broadway run premiered on April 16, 1906 and closing May 26th, 1906 with 35 performances at the New Amsterdam Theatre.

== Reviews ==
On February 7, 1907, The Pensacola Journal said the production was "a genuine comic opera in which the librettist has evolved as finished a story as he did in his great success Robin Hood more than a decade ago."

The march On to Victory was particularly well received and was "considered a worthy successor to The Washington Post and The Stars and Stripes Forever.

== Revivals ==
In 1979, Basil Langton produced The Free Lance at the Philadelphia Academy.

The New York Times stated in a review the production seemed to heavily lean on the American patriotism of John Philip Sousa over the actual setting of the made up kingdoms of Braggadocia and Graftaina that the operetta took place in.

- On the set, "the beautiful old house was festooned with American flags, and the set itself had American flags all over it. That was strange, because the locale was supposed to be the countries of Braggadocia and Graftania...But it did not work very well, and this directorial jingoism only detracted from the sweet, innocent little work — a work, by the way, that is as "American" as Gilbert and Sullivan."

In 2017, the Comic Opera Guild in Ann Arbor, Michigan performed a concert style production.

== Roles ==
Roles, Broadway cast, 1979 Langston Cast, 2017 Comic Opera Guild Cast
Role	1906 Broadway cast	1979 Langston cast	2017 Comic Opera Guild Cast
Siegmund Lump, a brigand chief (baritone)	Joseph Cawthorn	John Reardon	David Andrews
The Emperor of Braggadocia, a monarch devoted to art and poetry (baritone)	Felix Haney	Theodor Uppman	Tom Petiet
The Duke of Graftiana, a convivial potentate (bass)	Albert Hart	Anthony Tamburello	Chris Grapetine
Prince Florian, his son (tenor)	George Talman	Harry Danner	Christopher Wolf
Pertinax, Braggadocia's Court Censor (baritone)	Sim Pulen	James Greene	Georffrey Kelm
Dagonet, Graftiana's Minister of the Interior (baritone)	Louis Haines	Julio Rosario	James Walker
Leandre, a page	Geraldine Malone		Claire Agresta
Silvandre, a page	Monte Elmo		
Herald of Braggadocia	Henry J. Santra		Robert Westbrook
Griselda, a goose-girl (soprano)	Jeannette Lowrie	Evelyn Petros	Amanda Williams
Yolande, the Emperor's daughter, a sentimental princess	Nella Bergen	Shigemi Matsumoto	Schyler Sheltrown
Jacqueline, maid of honor	Estelle Thebaud		Alice Collins-Thompson
Diane, maid of honor	Dorothy Southwick		Barbara Cox-Diamond
Mopsa, an amateur sorceress (mezzo-soprano)	Fanny Midgley		Pat Petiet
Chorus of Courtiers, Pages, Maids of Honor, Warriors of Graftiana, Amazons of Braggadocia, and Members of Siegmund's Band of Brigands			

*Note: The Broadway cast was the same as the Court Square Theatre premiere.

== Music ==
Sousa used the melodies from The Free Lance to create the Band march of the same name.
