= Camp X-Ray =

Temporary detention facility at the Guantanamo Bay detention camp

Coordinates: 19.9382°N 75.0970°W

- Part of Naval Station Guantanamo Bay
- Guantánamo Bay in Cuba
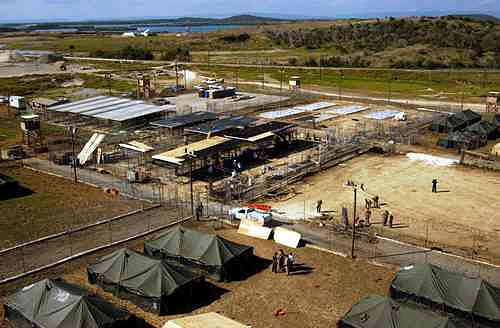
- Camp X-Ray under construction during January 2002 by NMCB 5 DET 503

Site information
- Type: US military temporary detention facility
- Operator: US Southern Command
- Controlled by: Joint Task Force 160 (JTF-160); Joint Task Force 170 (JTF-170)
- Condition: Closed

Location
- Location within Cuba

Site history
- Built: 1994
- Built by: Naval Mobile Construction Battalion 133 (2001–2002)
- In use: 1994–1996; 2001–2002

Garrison information
- Past commanders: Brigadier General Michael Lehnert; Brigadier General Rick Baccus

Camp X-Ray was a temporary detention facility at the Guantanamo Bay detention camp of Joint Task Force 160 on board the United States Naval Station Guantanamo Bay. The first twenty detainees arrived at Guantanamo on 11 January 2002. It was named Camp X-Ray because various temporary camps used to house Cuban and Haitian migrants in the 1980s and 1990s on board the station were named using NATO phonetic alphabet. The legal status of detainees at the camp, as well as government processes for trying their cases, has been a significant source of controversy; several landmark cases have been determined by the United States Supreme Court.

As of 29 April 2002, Camp X-Ray was closed and all prisoners were transferred to Camp Delta.

== Background ==
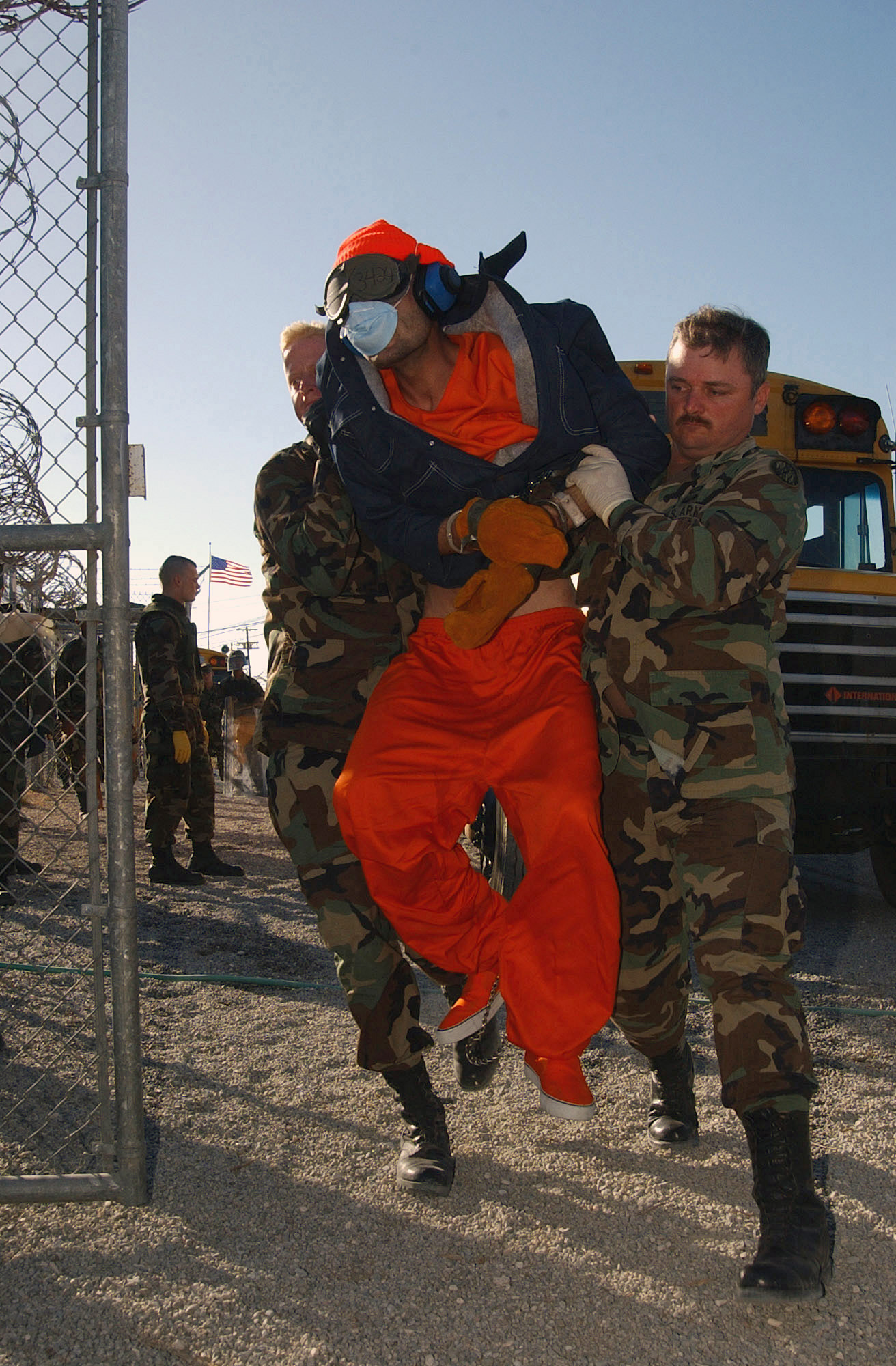
Prisoner lifted by 115th MPB personnel at Guantanamo Bay detainment camp, January 2002.

Camp X-Ray was originally built during Operation Sea Signal to house "excludables" in the mid-1990s when Fidel Castro allowed any Cuban wishing to do so, to cross through the Cuban-operated minefields and enter the base. Excludables were held in Camp X-ray near Post 37 before being sent back to Cuba. Excludables included troublemakers from the regular camps, where the United States was processing Cuban Asylum Seekers (CAS) for emigration to the United States. The US government was at the time allowed access to Cuban records to process these people. Over 100,000 CAS were processed in the mid-1990s and allowed to enter the United States.

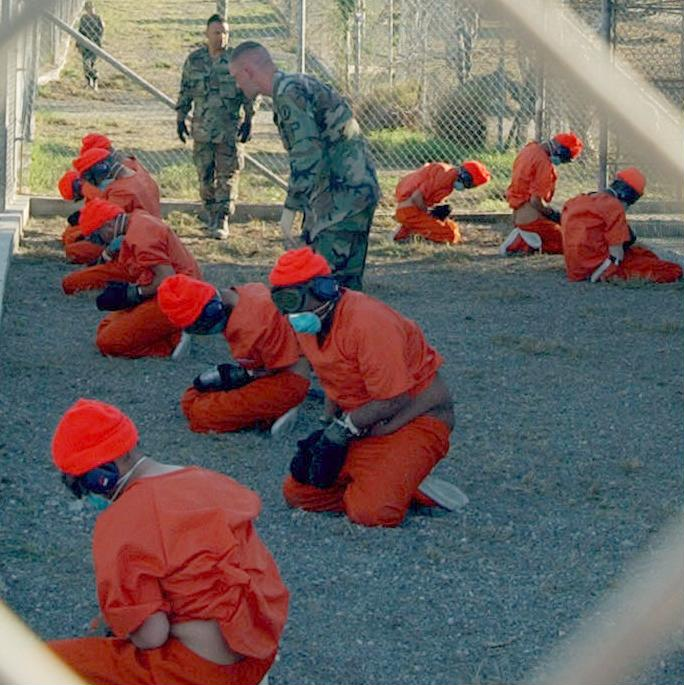
Detainees upon arrival at Camp X-Ray, January 2002

During the war on terror, beginning in the fall of 2001 after the 9/11 attacks, the US reestablished the camp for housing captured combatants. To get the camp running, Naval Mobile Construction Battalion 133 sent a detachment that had been working at Roosevelt Roads Naval Station. The supervision and care of these detainees at Camp X-Ray was handled by Joint Task Force 160 (JTF-160), while interrogations were conducted by Joint Task Force 170 (JTF-170). JTF-160 was under the command of Marine Brigadier General Michael R. Lehnert until March 2002, when he was replaced by Brigadier General Rick Baccus. Since Camp X-Ray's closure and the subsequent opening of Camp Delta, JTF-160 and 170 have been combined into Joint Task Force Guantanamo (JTF-GTMO).

While the permanent facilities at Camp Delta were under construction, soldiers guarding the detainees were housed in tents with living conditions described by the military as "not markedly different" from those of the prisoners. This camp was one of several locations managed by the United States where prisoners had suffered torture by US soldiers and agents in relation to interrogation.

== Conditions ==
Detainees at Camp X-Ray were held in open-air cells measuring about 2 by 2.6 metres, with a roof and floor but chain-link walls. Former guard Brandon Neely later stated that detainees had two buckets, one for water and one to use as a toilet.

Before the first detainees arrived, camp commander Brigadier General Michael R. Lehnert described them as "the worst of the worst"; according to The New York Times, this later proved not to be true.

On 11 January 2002, Navy photographer Shane T. McCoy photographed the first detainees kneeling in orange jumpsuits, shackled and wearing blackout goggles, ear muffs, surgical masks and gloves. The Department of Defense released several of the images about a week later. The photographs drew criticism in Europe and the Middle East. According to McCoy, the detainees wore the goggles, shackles and mittens for about an hour after arrival before being placed in their cells.

== Legal status ==
In a memorandum dated 7 February 2002, President George W. Bush determined that the Third Geneva Convention did not apply to the conflict with al-Qaeda, that Common Article 3 did not apply to al-Qaeda or Taliban detainees, and that al-Qaeda detainees did not qualify as prisoners of war. The White House stated that the Geneva Convention applied to Taliban detainees but not to al-Qaeda detainees, and that neither group was entitled to POW status. The administration maintained that detainees were being treated humanely and consistent with the principles of the Geneva Conventions.

Amnesty International expressed concern that detainees had been transferred to and held at Camp X-Ray in conditions that may amount to cruel, inhuman or degrading treatment.

The Supreme Court of the United States later ruled in Rasul v. Bush (2004) that US courts have jurisdiction to hear habeas corpus petitions from Guantanamo detainees, in Hamdan v. Rumsfeld (2006) that Common Article 3 of the Geneva Conventions applies to them, and in Boumediene v. Bush (2008) that they have a constitutional right to habeas corpus.

== Forensic examination ==
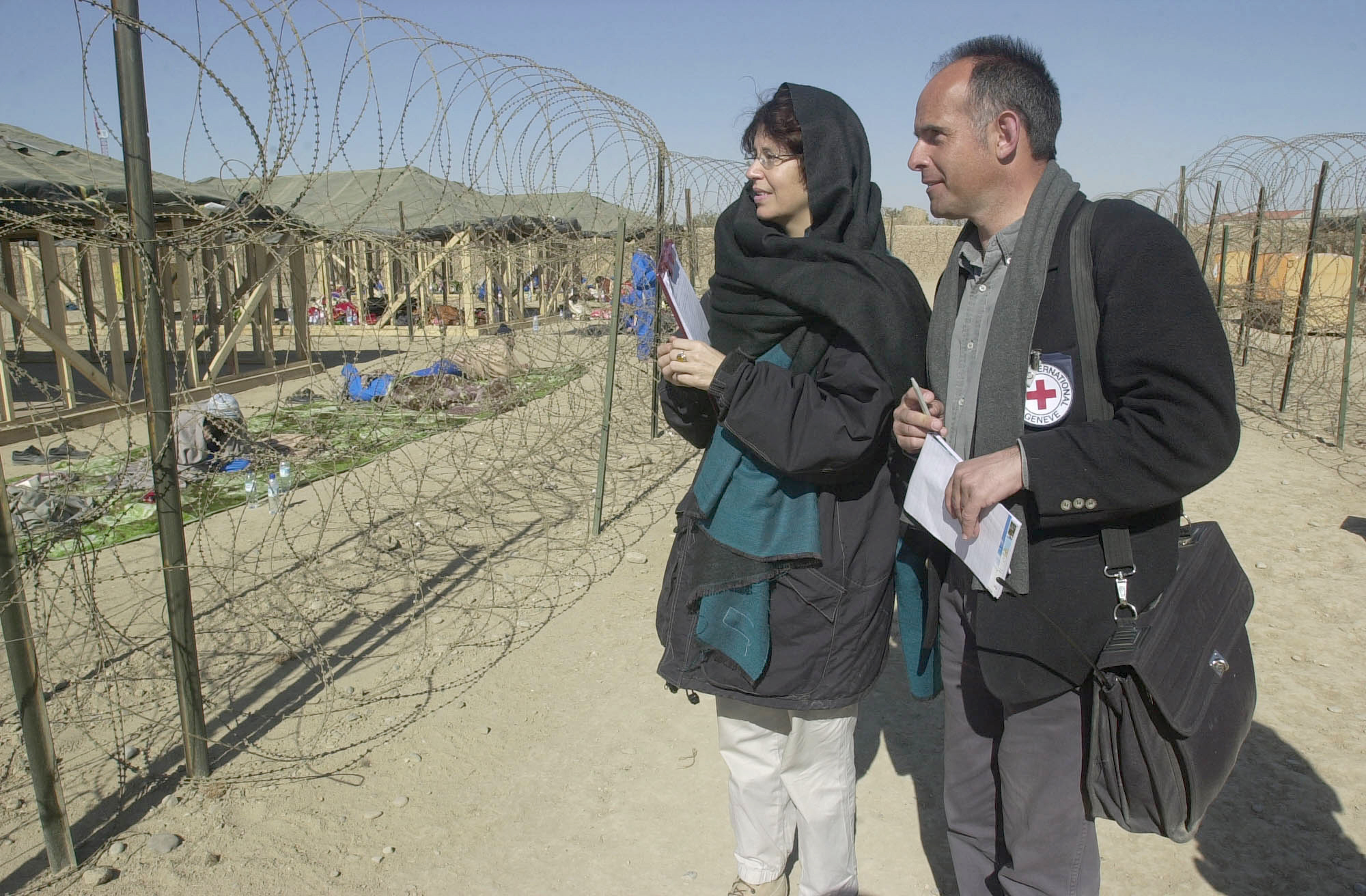
International Red Cross members visiting Camp X-Ray in January 2002.

According to Carol Rosenberg, writing for the Miami Herald, Camp X-Ray was visited by a court-ordered forensic FBI team in November 2009. The team spent a week photographing the camp and searching for evidence of abuse of prisoners.

== Brandon Neely ==
Brandon Neely, a military policeman who served at Camp X-Ray and Camp Delta during the first six months of 2002, gave testimony in December 2008 to the Guantánamo Testimonials Project at the University of California, Davis, describing beatings and humiliation of detainees by guards, as well as his own involvement in the first use-of-force incident at Camp X-Ray. In 2009, he tracked two inmates down and apologized for his treatment of them, saying that he still felt guilty. Neely also became involved with the organization Iraq Veterans Against the War.

== See also ==
- This Is Camp X-Ray, a UK art installation based on Camp X-Ray.
- Camp X-Ray, an American independent drama film based on Camp X-Ray.
