= Back When We Were Grownups =

2001 novel by Anne Tyler

- First edition
- Author: Anne Tyler
- Language: English
- Publisher: Knopf
- Publication date: May 1, 2001
- Publication place: United States
- Media type: Print (hardback & paperback)
- Pages: 288 pp
- ISBN: 0-375-41253-0
- OCLC: 47965249
- Dewey Decimal: 813/.54 21
- LC Class: PS3570.Y45 B33 2001b

Back When We Were Grownups is a 2001 novel written by Anne Tyler in memory of her husband, who died in 1997.

== Plot ==
Tyler's 15th novel, like most of her work, is set in Baltimore, Maryland. It opens with the sentence, "Once upon a time, there was a woman who discovered she had turned into the wrong person." The woman in question is Rebecca Davitch, a 53-year-old widow, mother, grandmother, and proprietor of a party and catering business run from her home called Open Arms. Up until age 20 Rebecca's life had been following a fairly predictable straight-line path towards both marriage to her high school sweetheart and a Ph.D. in history. Then Joe Davitch came along and she was "swept off my feet by a fully grown man, someone who...was already living his life." Joe was a 33-year-old divorcee with 3 children whom Rebecca met at a friend's party that happened to be at the Open Arms. One month later, Rebecca had quit college, had married Joe, and—as she quickly discovered—had married the Davitch family, with Joe's 3 daughters, his mother, his brother Zeb, his huge old Baltimore house (Open Arms) and its business as a venue for celebrations of all sorts—weddings, graduations, christenings, anniversaries, etc. Before too long she also discovers that she has become the de facto manager of the Open Arms and the mother of Joe's 3 girls and their own new baby daughter. When Joe himself dies after only 6 years of marriage and Joe's uncle Poppy moves in, she finds herself with even more responsibility. Having cheerfully and exhaustingly raised four daughters, run the "celebrations business," and helped her daughters through 6 marriages (+ 2 divorces) and 7 grandchildren, Rebecca is now taking a breath to ask, "What happened to the 20-year young woman who was a serious scholar, politically-involved idealist, engaged to be engaged….?"

At an engagement party for one of her stepdaughters, Rebecca finds herself questioning everything about her life, and decides to take steps to resurrect her former self. Her self-improvement project includes a visit to her hometown in Virginia, picking up old hobbies, reading books that she had read in college, and renewing her intellectual interests, without abandoning her many matriarchal and professional duties. She also eventually gets reacquainted with her old college/high school sweetheart. Will Allenby is a somewhat stodgy and constricted person (much as he was in college, way "back when they were grownups") and is now a divorced physics professor working at the same nearby college that they had both attended. While Rebecca is touched by certain remembrances and traits of Will, her fantasy of re-kindling their old affections is spoiled by his sad, staid and inflexible demeanor. Rebecca eventually realizes that the path that she chose (or chose her) decades ago may have resulted in her "right person" after all.

== Reviews ==
Beth Kephart:

"Back When We Were Grownups is Tyler's fifteenth novel, and she is still not scrimping on wackiness and wit, on sentences of shocking originality, on wisdom. ...There's not a flat line in this book, not a single simple character, not a moment that isn't tapped for all its glorious possibilities. There is a party on almost every page, and there is also the party's aftermath. This is storytelling at its best and most breathtaking. Tyler, an acknowledged master of the form, is living up to her well-earned reputation. "With Davitch, Tyler has created a character who is brave enough to look back on her life and to imagine herself making different kinds of choices. Brave enough to wonder what honesty looks like, whether there is ever really a single distillation of self that is unshakable and true....Anne Tyler has a talent for spinning out characters we care about, characters who go on living long after their stories end."

Publishers Weekly:

"Tyler...has a gift for creating endearing characters, but readers should find Rebecca particularly appealing, for despite the blows she takes, she bravely keeps on trying. Tyler also has a gift...for unfurling intricate stories effortlessly, as if by whimsy or accident. The ease of her storytelling here is breathtaking, but almost unnoticeable because, rather like Rebecca, Tyler never calls attention to what she does. Late in the novel, Rebecca observes that her younger self had wanted to believe "that there were grander motivations in history than mere family and friends, mere domestic happenstance." Tyler makes it plain: nothing could be more grand."

Tom Shone:

"But then that's the thing about Anne Tyler novels: your certainty about how things are going to turn out in no way interferes with your desire to see them do so. Tyler's plots are the mere stuff of family albums, really—a procession of marriages, births, deaths. And yet her feel for character is so keen that even…readers who….would happily fry the whole notion of "character" for breakfast—are reduced to the role of helpless gossips, swapping avid hunches about the possible fates of the characters. You're involved before you even notice you were paying attention."

== Author's comments on novel and characters ==
"I plotted Back When We Were Grownups just after emerging from a year in which there had been several losses and serious illnesses in my family. I wanted my next novel to be full of joy and celebration, which is how I ended up with a main character who earned her living throwing parties. That a sense of loss shows through anyway, at a later point in the book, is proof that the subconscious always tends to triumph in the end." [Tyler's husband, Taghi Modarressi died of lymphoma in 1997; this novel was finally published in 2001.]

"Rebecca is no more astute—or less—than most of us about her reasons for doing things. If people were fully conscious of their motives, novelists wouldn't have anything to write novels about."

"I'm very fond of Peter. I like his curiosity and his active mind; I think he's going to grow up to be a very interesting young man."

"Someday, Zeb and Rebecca are going to marry. The Davitches will be taken aback at first, but they'll warm to the idea whole-heartedly as soon as they've adjusted."

== Production ==
Susanna Styron adapted the novel for a CBS Hallmark Hall of Fame production that first aired on November 21, 2004. Starring Blythe Danner, Peter Fonda, Jack Palance (in his final film before his death in 2006), Faye Dunaway, Peter Riegert, Ione Skye, Anjul Nigam, Jonathon Pickett, and Nina Foch. It was directed by Ron Underwood. It garnered both Emmy Award and Golden Globe nominations for Danner.
