= Show Me the Monet (TV series) =

British television series

Show Me the Monet is a British television series first aired on BBC2 in May 2011. It is presented by Chris Hollins. The programme has been described as the "artworld's version of The X Factor and Dragons' Den".

== Format ==
The programme invites several thousand artists to submit their artworks for scrutiny by a panel of expert art critics, called the "Hanging Committee". For the first two series the "Hanging Committee" consisted of art experts David Lee, Charlotte Mullins and Roy Bolton. The artists successfully approved by the "Hanging Committee" have the opportunity to exhibit their work at a top London venue, where a secret bidding process decides whether the work is sold. In 2011 only 35 artists were selected for the final exhibition. In 2012 the final exhibition took place at the Mall Galleries in London.

== Criticism ==
The TV critic of The Guardian was scathing about the presenter and judges, while suggesting the programme's format "looked tired after 10 minutes".
