= 43rd Military Police Brigade =

- 43rd Military Police Brigade Shoulder Sleeve Insignia
- Active: 4 March 1959 – present
- Country: United States
- Branch: United States Army National Guard
- Type: Military Police Brigade
- Role: Military Police
- Size: Brigade
- Part of: Rhode Island Army National Guard
- Garrison/HQ: Warwick, Rhode Island
- Motto: "Protect the Right"
- Anniversaries: Birthday: 1 May 1968
- Engagements: Global war on terrorism Operation Iraqi Freedom; Operation Enduring Freedom
- Battle honours: Meritorious Unit Citation; Rhode Island Gubernatorial Unit Citation

Commanders
- Current commander: COL Craig R. Maceri
- Notable commanders: BG Javier A. Reina

Insignia
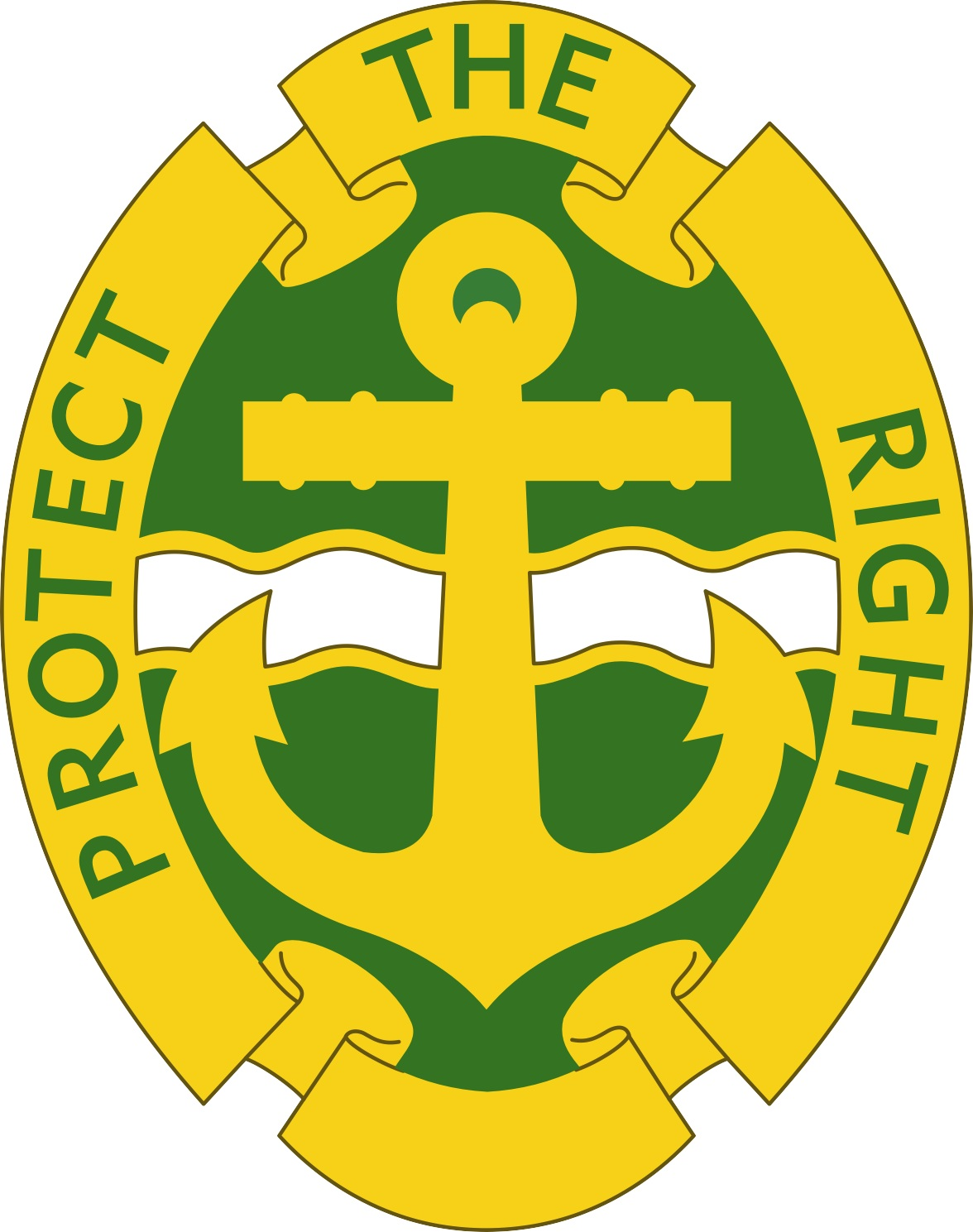
- Distinctive unit insignia

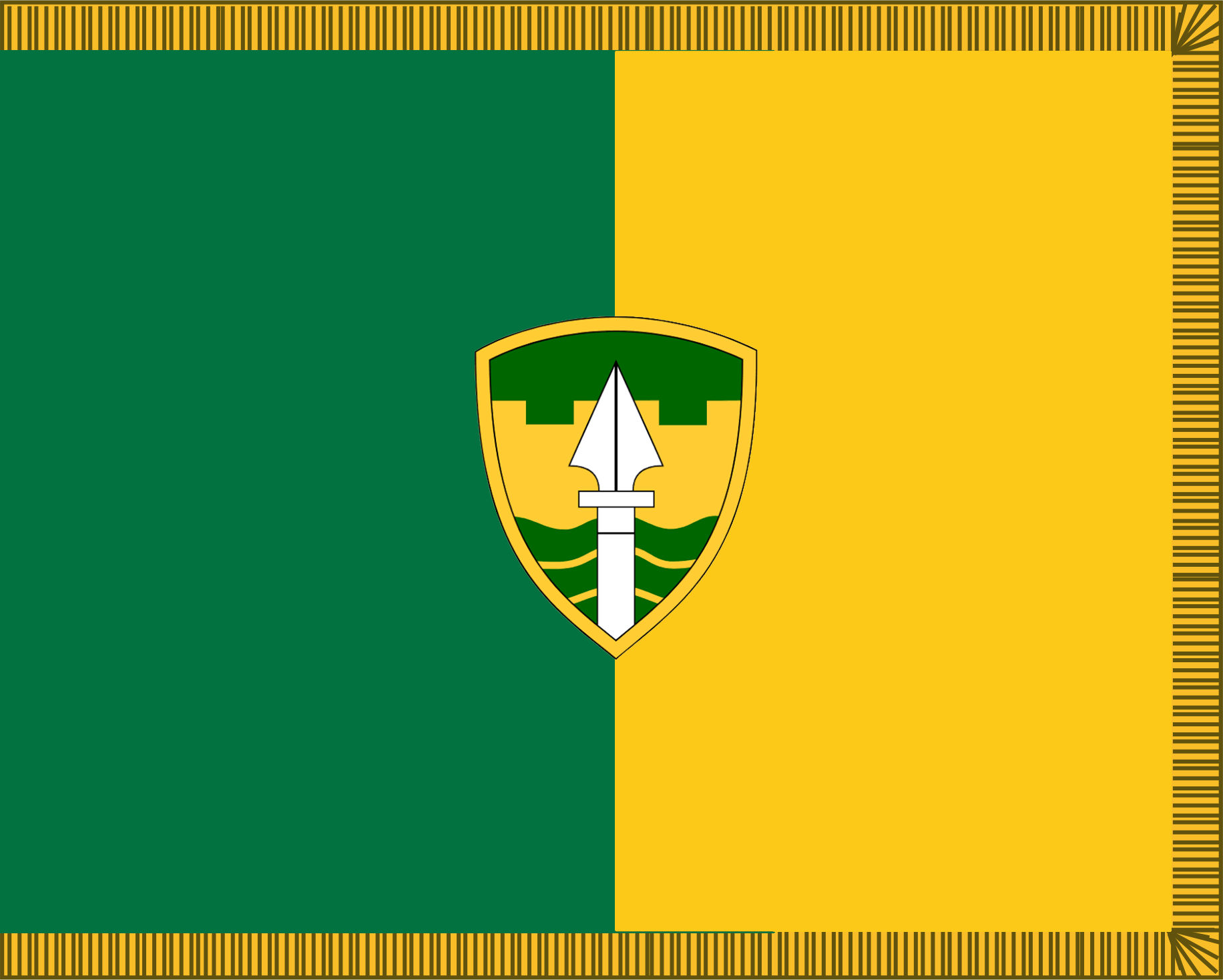
- 43rd Military Police Brigade Flag

The 43rd Military Police Brigade is a military police brigade of the United States Army. It is part of the Rhode Island National Guard.

== Organization ==
Within the Rhode Island Army National Guard, the 43rd Military Police Brigade commands the 118th Military Police Battalion, to which the 115th and 169th Military Police companies are assigned. In addition, the brigade exercises administrative control over 1st Battalion, 103rd Field Artillery.

The headquarters of the 43rd Military Police Brigade is located at the Warwick Armory in Warwick, Rhode Island.

== History ==
The 43rd Military Police Brigade was constituted 4 March 1959 and allotted to the Rhode Island Army National Guard as Headquarters and Headquarters Detachment, 103d Replacement Battalion. Organized and Federally recognized 1 April 1959 at Providence. Converted and redesignated 18 March 1963 as Headquarters and Headquarters Company, 43d Engineer Group. Converted and redesignated 1 May 1968 as Headquarters and Headquarters Detachment, 43d Military Police Brigade. Reorganized and redesignated 1 May 1976 as Headquarters and Headquarters Company, 43d Military Police Brigade.

One of the next major state activations came in 1978. The "Blizzard of '78" crippled the state and forced all units to be called to duty from 6–16 February 1978. The 43rd organized traffic control to allow engineers to perform snow removal. MP's were stationed throughout the downtown area to prevent looting. There had not been a statewide call up since the "Hurricane of '38", thirty-nine years earlier.

Prior to 1986, the 43rd MP Brigade had two subordinate Military Police Battalions - the 118th and the 243rd. The 118th MP Battalion had the 115th and 119th MP companies assigned to it and the 243rd had the 169th and 1111th MP companies assigned to it. In 1986, the 243rd MP Battalion and the 1111th MP Company were deactivated with the 169th MP Company being transferred to the 118th MP Battalion. Other units under the 43d MP Brigade were the 1207th Transportation Company and Company D, 280th Signal Battalion (from 1986 until its deactivation in 1993).

=== Global war on terror ===
Soldiers from the Headquarters and Headquarters Company, 43rd Military Police Brigade, mobilized in April 2002, then deployed from Fort Dix, New Jersey, in May 2002 to the US Naval Base, Guantanamo Bay, Cuba. The brigade was under the command of Brigadier General Richard Baccus. There they replaced the 89th Military Police Brigade as the new headquarters element for Joint Task Force – 160 (JTF-160). In early 2002, the US Southern Command (SOUTHCOM) established JTF-160 and JTF-170 to operate a detention and interrogation facility at the naval base. In November of the same year, the two task forces consolidated to become Joint Task Force – Guantanamo (JTF-GTMO). During this period, US military personnel from all five services planned and executed a mission to safely and humanely detain suspected terrorists. Soldiers redeployed in November/December 2002 and demobilized in January 2003. On 28 January 2003, the Chairman of the Joint Chiefs of Staff awarded the Joint Meritorious Unit Award (JMUA) to Headquarters, JTF-160, for exceptionally meritorious achievement during the period 4 January – 31 October 2002.

=== Operation Iraqi Freedom ===
Headquarters and Headquarters Company, 43rd Military Police Brigade, was mobilized in August 2005, and deployed to Iraq under the command of Brigadier General Kevin R. McBride. The mission was to provide Command and Control (C2) for all Theater Internment Facilities (TIFs) in support of Joint Task Force 134 and Multi-National Force – Iraq. Additionally the brigade managed the training and integration of Iraqi Corrections Officers and initiated the transfer of authority for all TIFs to the government of Iraq in support of UNSCR 1546.

While deployed, the brigade commanded five MP battalions, twenty-three companies, two brigade liaison detachments, and two coalition forces detachments totaling approximately 5,000 assigned soldiers, sailors, airmen, marines, and coalition forces at five separate detention facilities throughout the country. The 43rd oversaw the closure of the Abu Ghraib TIF, officially named the Baghdad Correctional Custody Facility (BCCF), in July 2006, built a new detention facility at Camp Cropper, and expanded Camp Bucca making it the largest detention facility in the world. The 43rd MP Bde was also responsible for the development of the Iraqi Corrections Officer (ICO) Academy, which trained over 1600 Iraqi Correction Officers. The 43rd Military Police Brigade was awarded the Meritorious Unit Citation for "Exceptionally Meritorious Service" during combat operations.

=== Operation Enduring Freedom ===
Soldiers from the Headquarters and Headquarters Company, 43rd Military Police Brigade, mobilized in March 2011, deploying to Afghanistan under the command of Brigadier General Charles Petrarca. The unit had control of detention operations along with the Afghan National Police at Bagram Airbase. They returned home to Rhode Island on 7 March 2012.

In October 2012 elements of the 43rd MP Brigade were mobilized following Superstorm Sandy to conduct security and traffic control operations.

In early 2017, about 60 personnel from the Headquarters Company of the 43d MP Brigade deployed to Guantánamo Bay, Cuba to provide staffing for the headquarters element of Joint Task Force Guantanamo.

== Shoulder Sleeve Insignia ==
The shoulder sleeve insignia was approved on 16 May 1969, consisting of a green shield with a yellow wall of two crenelles above three green wavy bars, issuing from base and surmounted overall a white pike all within a yellow border. The fortification above the wavy bars alludes to the wall surrounding the 15th-century city of Rhodes, capital of the island of Rhodes in the eastern Mediterranean after which Rhode Island was named. The wavy bars also represent Narragansett Bay and the many waterways of the state. The pike, any early weapon used by guards symbolizes the 43d Military Police Brigade's ability to give protection and strong support.

== Commanding officers ==
- Brigadier General John Kane, 1966–1968
- Brigadier General Harold Read, 1968–1970
- Brigadier General Morphis Jamiel, 1970–1972
- Brigadier General Thomas Cordner, 1980–1985
- Brigadier General Andre Trudeau, 1985–1987 (Adjutant General of Rhode Island, 1990–1995)
- Colonel Ralph H. Lataille, 1987–1988
- Colonel Francis Holland, 1988–1990
- Brigadier General Richard Valente, 1990–1995
- Brigadier General James Dunn, 1995–2000
- Brigadier General James Reed, 2000–2001
- Brigadier General Richard Baccus, 2001–2003
- Brigadier General Kevin R. McBride, 2003–2008 (Adjutant General of Rhode Island, 2010–2015)
- Brigadier General James E. Keighley, 2008–2010
- Brigadier General Charles Petrarca, 2010–2012
- Brigadier General David Mederios, 2012
- Colonel Thomas P. Clark, 2012–2014
- Colonel Javier Reina, 2014–2019
- Colonel Craig R. Maceri, 2019–present
