= Robert Mosley =

American opera singer

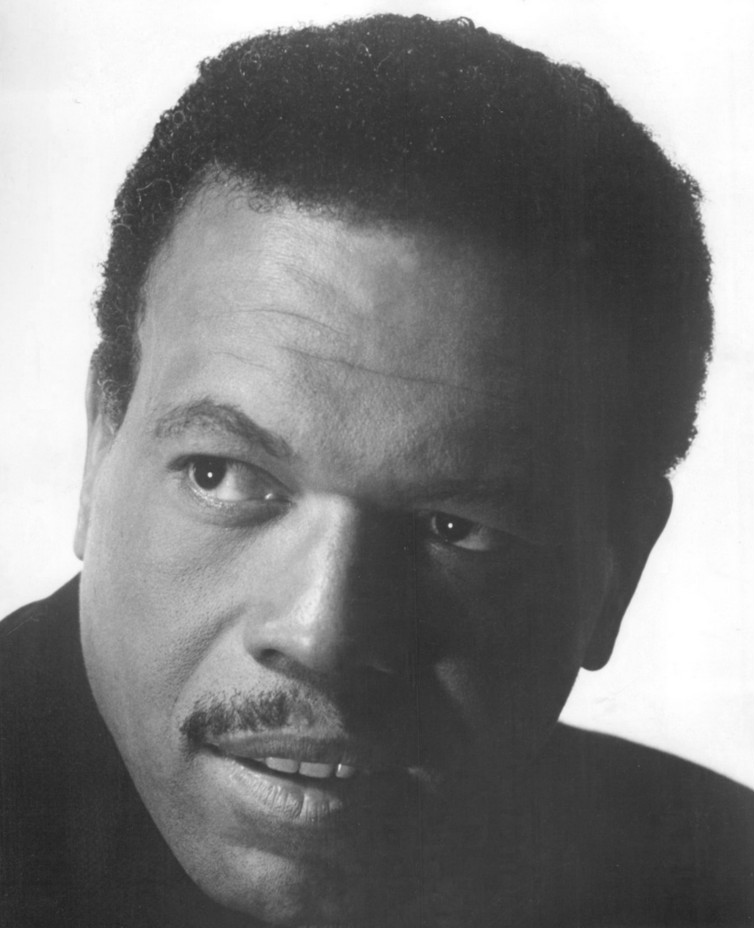
Robert Mosley in 1974.

Robert Mosley (1927 – April 30, 2002) was an American operatic bass-baritone. Part of the first generation of African-American opera singers to achieve wide success, he performed in numerous opera productions, recitals, and in concerts from the 1950s through the 1990s. In 1957 he won the Metropolitan Opera National Council Auditions. He drew particular acclaim for his portrayal of Porgy in George Gershwin's Porgy and Bess, a role which he portrayed in the landmark 1976 Houston Grand Opera production, on Broadway, and at the Metropolitan Opera among other opera companies both in the United States and in Europe.

== Early life and career ==
Born in Pittsburgh, Pennsylvania, Mosley grew up in Oakland and attended Schenley High School from which he graduated in 1946. He then pursued studies in voice at West Chester University where he was a pupil of William E. Bretz. In the early 1950s he began performing in local music revues in Pittsburgh, and was also seen occasionally as a featured singer on the KDKA-TV program The Bill Brant Show. From 1955 to 1957 he worked as the regular vocalist for a morning show on that network.

In 1957 Mosley was awarded the Great Lakes Regional Auditions of the Metropolitan Opera Auditions of the Air in Cleveland, Ohio, and shortly after, was one of three scholarship winners of the Metropolitan Opera National Council Auditions in their New York Broadcast Audition. He soon after began working as a concert singer, making appearances with the Pittsburgh Wind Symphony, the Pittsburgh Symphony Orchestra, the American Broadcasting Company Symphony, the Baltimore Symphony, and the newly organized Pittsburgh Pops Orchestra during the late 1950s and early 1960s.

In 1962 Mosley relocated to New York City to pursue further studies in singing after winning the John Jay Whitney Foundation prize which provided him with funds for professional vocal training. That same year he won the Marian Anderson Award and in 1963 he was the recipient of a Rockefeller Foundation Grant. In New York City he was a pupil of Giuseppe Danise and Pasquale Rescigno.

== Career success ==
In 1965 Mosley made his professional opera debut as Porgy in George Gershwin's Porgy and Bess with the New York City Opera at Lincoln Center. That same year he made his New York recital debut at Town Hall. Later that year he sang Porgy again for his debut with the New York Philharmonic at Avery Fisher Hall. In 1966 he returned to the NYCO to portray Valentin in Faust with Beverly Sills as Marguerite. That same year he performed the role of Joe in Show Boat in a tour of South America for the United States State Department. He portrayed Joe again for his debut at the Los Angeles Civic Light Opera in 1967 and for his debut at the Goodspeed Opera House in 1980. In 1969 he was heard with the NYCO again as Tonio in Pagliacci and he toured the United States in performances of Carl Orff's Carmina Burana with the American Symphony Orchestra and conductor Leopold Stokowski.

In 1971 Mosley made his debut at the San Francisco Opera (SFO) in the title role of Giuseppe Verdi's Rigoletto with Carol Toscano as Gilda and Harry Danner as the Duke of Mantua. He returned to the SFO twice more during his career, as Trinity Moses in Kurt Weill's Rise and Fall of the City of Mahagonny in 1972 and as Porgy in 1977. In 1972 he portrayed Amonasro in Aida at the Trenton War Memorial. In 1973 he portrayed Trinity Moses for his debut with the Opera Company of Boston and in 1974 he portrayed Amonasro for his debut with the Seattle Opera. He notably created the role of Leonce in the world premiere of William Grant Still's A Bayou Legend Opera/South in Jackson, Mississippi on April 10, 1976.

In 1976 Mosley made his debut at the Houston Grand Opera (HGO) as Porgy to Clamma Dale's Bess in the company's landmark production of that work. He alternated in performances of that role with baritone Donnie Ray Albert. He continued to alternate with Albert in the role when the production moved to Broadway in 1976–1977, and in a 1978 European tour of the HGO production which included performances at the Paris Opera, Teatro Margherita, Teatro Massimo, and Zurich Opera. He also sang Porgy in the 1983 Broadway revival. On February 23, 1985 Mosley made his debut at the Metropolitan Opera as Porgy to Grace Bumbry's Bess with James Levine conducting. He portrayed that part for two seasons at the Met.

During his career Mosley also sang leading roles with the Fort Worth Opera, Michigan Opera Theater, Pittsburgh Civic Light Opera, and Opera Memphis among other companies. Other roles he performed on stage included Ford in Falstaff, Germont in La traviata, Iago in Otello, Scarpia in Tosca, and the title role in The Flying Dutchman. While he continued to perform into the last years of his life, his performance career significantly slowed after the mid 1980s. He spent the last years of his life in Kure Beach, North Carolina.
