= Katherine Moennig =

American actress (born 1977)

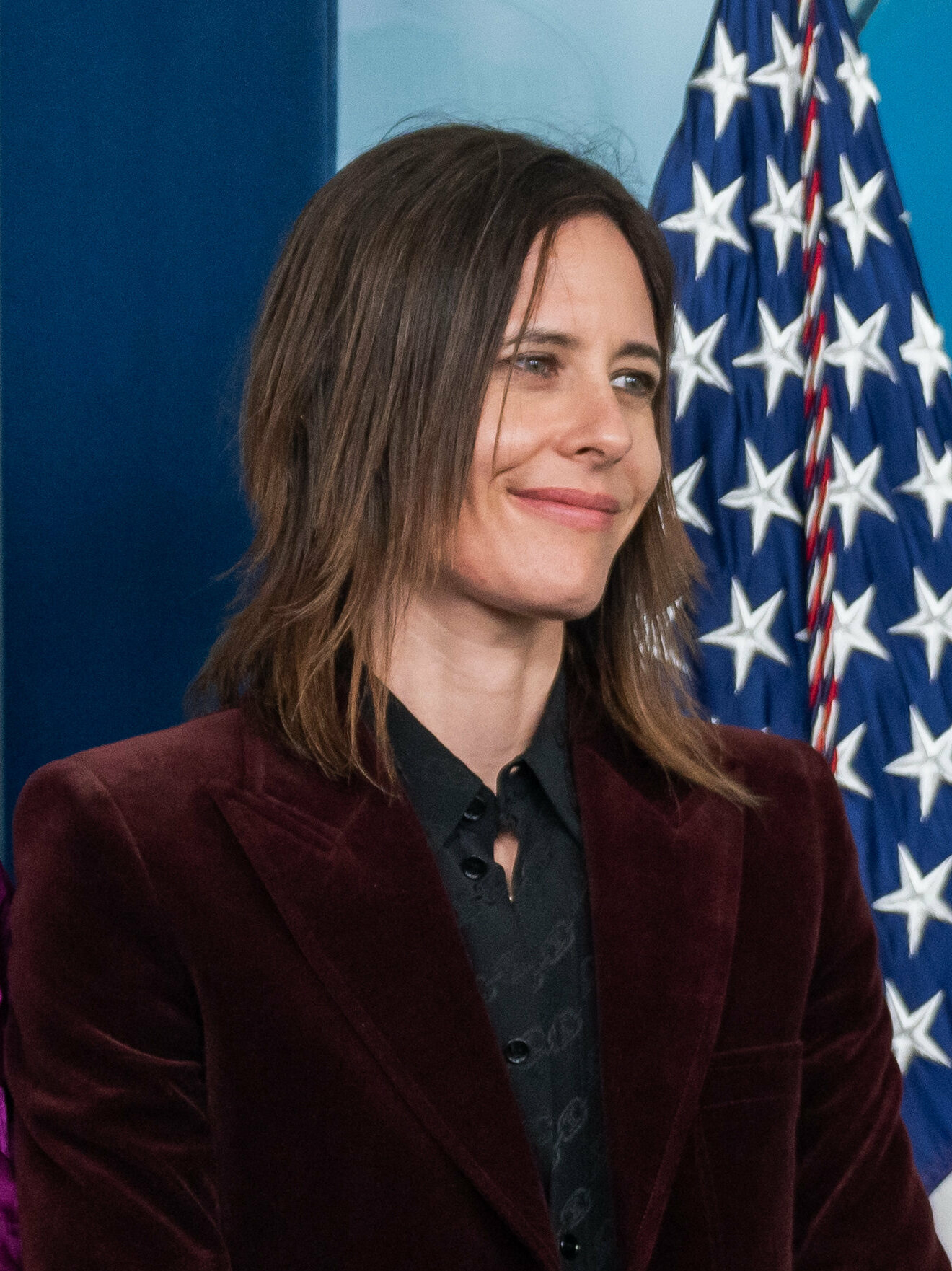
- Moennig at the White House in 2023
- Born: Katherine Sian Moennig; December 29, 1977 (age 48); Philadelphia, Pennsylvania, U.S.
- Education: American Academy of Dramatic Arts
- Occupation: Actress
- Years active: 2000–present
- Spouse: Ana Rezende (m. 2017)
- Relatives: Blythe Danner (paternal aunt); Harry Danner (paternal uncle); Gwyneth Paltrow (paternal cousin); Jake Paltrow (paternal cousin)

Katherine Sian Moennig (/ˈmɛnɪɡ/; born December 29, 1977), often credited as Kate Moennig, is an American actress and producer. She is best known for her role as Shane McCutcheon on The L Word (2004–2009) and its sequel The L Word: Generation Q (2019–2023). She previously gained recognition for her role as Jacqueline "Jake" Pratt in the WB series Young Americans (2000), and later had a recurring role as Lena Burnham in the Showtime crime drama Ray Donovan (2013–2019).

In addition to her television work, Moennig has appeared in films such as Art School Confidential (2006), Everybody's Fine (2009), and The Lincoln Lawyer (2011), and has worked in theater and voice acting.

== Early life ==
Katherine Sian Moennig was born in Philadelphia, Pennsylvania, to Broadway dancer Mary Zahn and violin maker William H. Moennig III. She is the niece of actress Blythe Danner and a cousin of actress Gwyneth Paltrow and film director Jake Paltrow.

She attended the Academy of Notre Dame de Namur, and at the age of 18, moved to New York City to study acting at the American Academy of Dramatic Arts. During this period, she also participated in stage productions and theater training, including work at the Williamstown Theatre Festival.

== Career ==
=== Beginnings (2000–2004) ===
Moennig began her career with appearances in advertising and music videos. In 2000, she appeared in the music video for Is Anybody Home? by the Canadian rock band Our Lady Peace. Around the same time, she appeared in a Fleet Bank commercial and auditioned for the role of Brandon Teena in the film Boys Don't Cry.

Her first major television role was in 2000, when she was cast as Jacqueline "Jake" Pratt in the WB series Young Americans. The character, a teenage girl who disguises herself as a boy to attend an all-male boarding school, became one of Moennig's earliest widely recognized performances.

Following the series, Moennig made guest appearances on television programs including Law & Order, Law & Order: Special Victims Unit, and CSI: Miami, while also appearing in films such as The Shipping News (2001) and Invitation to a Suicide (2004).

=== Breakthrough with The L Word (2004–2009) ===
Moennig achieved broader recognition in 2004 when she was cast as Shane McCutcheon in the Showtime drama series The L Word. The series, which ran for six seasons until 2009, focused on the lives of a group of lesbian women in Los Angeles and became one of the most prominent television series centered on LGBTQ+ characters. Moennig's portrayal of Shane, an androgynous hairstylist, became one of the show's most recognizable characters.

During and after the series' run, Moennig appeared in several films, including Art School Confidential and Everybody's Fine, the latter alongside Drew Barrymore. She also made her Off-Broadway debut as "American Girl", opposite Lee Pace, in Guardians by Peter Morris. The play is loosely based on the story of Lynndie England.

=== Ray Donovan and other television roles (2009–2019) ===
In 2009, Moennig joined the cast of the CBS medical drama Three Rivers, portraying transplant surgeon Dr. Miranda Foster. The series was cancelled after one season. In 2013, she got a recurring role in Showtime crime drama Ray Donovan, playing Lena Burnham throughout the series' run until 2019. The character served as the title character's assistant and close associate. Moennig later reprised the role in Ray Donovan: The Movie. She also appeared in several episodes of This Just Out in 2010, 2015, and 2017.

Moennig also had a recurring role as Professor Paige Hewson in the Freeform comedy drama Grown-ish.

=== Return to The L Word and later work (2019–present) ===
In 2019, Moennig reprised her role as Shane McCutcheon in the sequel series The L Word: Generation Q, which continued the story of the original series with both returning and new characters. During its run, in 2020, Moennig started a podcast with co-star and close friend Leisha Hailey, titled Pants. The show ran for three seasons, before getting cancelled in 2023. That year, Moennig, Hailey, Jennifer Beals, and the co-creator of The L Word, Ilene Chaiken, appeared at the White House for lesbian visibility week. In 2025, Moennig and Hailey co-authored the memoir So Gay for You: Friendship, Found Family, and the Show That Started It All, which discusses their friendship and their experiences working on the series.

== Personal life ==
Moennig is a lesbian, something she realised while playing Shane on The L Word. She married Brazilian musician and film director Ana Rezende in 2017.

== Filmography ==
=== Film ===
Year	Title	Role	Notes
2000	The Ice People	Wanja Kasczinsky	Short film
2001	Slo-Mo	Raven	Short film
2001	Love the Hard Way	Debbie	
2001	The Shipping News	Grace Moosup	
2004	Invitation to a Suicide	Eva	
2006	Art School Confidential	Candace	
2009	Everybody's Fine	Jilly	
2010	Lez Chat	Athletic Woman	Short film
2011	The Lincoln Lawyer	Gloria	
2012	Gone	Erica Lonsdale	
2014	Default	Juliana	
2016	My Dead Boyfriend	Zoe	
2017	Lane 1974	Hallelujah	
2023	Squealer	Earline	
2026	Perfect		

=== Television ===
Year	Title	Role	Notes
2000	Young Americans	Jacqueline "Jake" Pratt	Main role (8 episodes)
2001	Law & Order	Melissa Cobin	Episode: "For Love or Money" (S12E03)
2003	Law & Order: Special Victims Unit	Cheryl Avery	Episode: "Fallacy" (S4E21)
2004–2009	The L Word	Shane McCutcheon	Main role (70 episodes)
2008	CSI: Miami	Mary Landis	Episode: "Rock and a Hard Place" (S6E19)
2009–2010	Three Rivers	Dr. Miranda Foster	Main role (13 episodes)
2010	Dexter	Michael Angelo	Episode: "First Blood" (S5E05)
2013–2019	Ray Donovan	Lena Burnham	Main role (65 episodes)
2019	Grown-ish	Professor Paige Hewson	Recurring role (8 episodes)
2019–2023	The L Word: Generation Q	Shane McCutcheon	Main role
2022	Ray Donovan: The Movie	Lena Burnham	Television film
2024	No Good Deed	Gwen Delvecchio	3 episodes

=== Music videos ===
Year	Title	Artist	Role	Ref.
2000	Is Anybody Home?	Our Lady Peace		

=== Audiobooks ===
Year	Title	Role	Notes	Ref.
2017	The Late Show	Narrator		
2024	Amplified	Sam Shaw	3 episodes	

== Theatre ==
Title	Role
Guardians	American Girl
As You Like It	Shepherdess
The Theory of Total Blame	Irene
Comedy of Art	Isabella
Morning in the City	
Nolan	Karen
Love Letters	Dr. Melissa
The Shadow Box	Felicity
The Murder of Lidice	Byeta
The Two Gentlemen of Verona	Lucetta
A Late Show	Pat
Burn This	Anna
Alone at the Beach	Chris
Lovers	Maggie
Anna K	Anna

== Bibliography ==
- So Gay for You: Friendship, Found Family, and the Show That Started It All (2025) by Kate Moennig and Leisha Hailey, St. Martin's Press, ISBN 978-1250361363
