= Harry Danner =

American opera singer

- Years active: 1963–present
- Spouse: Dorothy Danner
- Children: 1
- Relatives: Blythe Danner (sister); William Moennig (brother); Hillary Danner (daughter); Gwyneth Paltrow (niece); Katherine Moennig (niece)

Harry Danner is an American operatic tenor and actor of stage, screen, and film.

== Early life ==
Raised in Springfield Township, Pennsylvania, Danner attended George School (graduated 1957) and Dickinson College.

== Professional career ==
While stationed at Fort Myer, Virginia, he appeared as Lieutenant Cable in the American Light Opera Company production of South Pacific, 1963 at Trinity Theatre in Georgetown.

In 1967, he performed in four concerts during dinners at the White House which were attended by President Lyndon B. Johnson.

In 1970, Danner began his career as an opera singer with performances as Rodolfo in La bohème at both the New York City Opera and the Lake George Opera.

In 1971 he made his debut at the San Francisco Opera as the Duke of Mantua in Giuseppe Verdi's Rigoletto with Robert Mosley in the title role. He returned to San Francisco twice more during his career, portraying Curly in Carlisle Floyd's Of Mice and Men in 1974, and a soldier in the United States premiere of Viktor Ullmann's Der Kaiser von Atlantis in 1977.

In 1972, Danner performed the role of Leutold in Rossini's William Tell with the Opera Orchestra of New York. In 1973 he starred in the Kennedy Center's production of Sigmund Romberg's The Student Prince.

He continued with the production when it went on national tour the following year. In 1977 he portrayed Jolidon to Roberta Peters' Sonia in The Merry Widow at the Valley Forge Music Fair. In 1979 he portrayed Prince Florian in the Opera Company of Philadelphia's production of John Philip Sousa's The Free Lance. In 1980 he made his debut with the Opera Company of Boston as Alfred in Die Fledermaus. He returned there the following year as the Major Domo/Landlord in Der Rosenkavalier.

He returned to Lake George for the 1980–81 season to portray Sam Polk in Carlisle Floyd's Susannah.

Danner has appeared as a guest star on several television programs, including Ally McBeal, Chicago Hope, Law & Order: Special Victims Unit, NYPD Blue, Scrubs, and Touched by an Angel. He has also appeared in films like The Wedding Planner and Van Wilder.

== Personal life ==
He is the brother of actress Blythe Danner and violin maker William Moennig, and the uncle of actresses Gwyneth Paltrow and Katherine Moennig. He is married to opera director Dorothy Danner, née Frank, and the father of Hillary Danner.
