= Tara McKelvey =

American journalist

Tara Shannon McKelvey is an American journalist who is a White House reporter for the BBC and a former correspondent for Newsweek/The Daily Beast. She has reported on topics which include national-security issues from the Middle East, South Asia and Russia.

== Career ==
McKelvey began her journalism career as a clerk at The New York Times, following her graduation from Georgetown University. She is also a frequent contributor to The New York Times Book Review and The American Prospect and a former contributing editor of Marie Claire. McKelvey also, at one point, taught a course on National Security and the Media at Georgetown University's School of Foreign Service. McKelvey is now a White House reporter for the BBC.

== Fellowships ==
In 2011, McKelvey was awarded a Guggenheim Fellowship in General Nonfiction. McKelvey also won an Alicia Patterson Journalism Fellowship in 2010 to research and write about the military's black operations. For her investigative work on national security, McKelvey was supported by not only the Alicia Patterson Foundation but also Northwestern University's Carnegie National Security Journalism Initiative. McKelvey, a fellow at Joan Shorenstein Center on the Press, Politics and Public Policy at Harvard University, wrote on the relationship between the media and US covert operations.

McKelvey was also a research fellow at New York University School of Law's Center on Law and Security, an Ochberg Fellow under the Dart Center for Journalism and Trauma, a Hoover Media Fellow at Stanford University's Hoover Institution, and lastly she was a fellow with the Templeton-Cambridge Fellowship in Religion and Science program and in an International Reporting Project done by Johns Hopkins University.

== Books ==
- Monstering: Inside America's Policy on Secret Interrogations and Torture in the Terror War. Carroll & Graf, 2007.
- "New Threats to Freedom"
- "The Impact of 9/11 and the New Legal Landscape"

=== As editor ===
- One of the Guys: Female Torturers and Aggressors. Seal Press, 2007.
