= David Lee (art critic) =

Outspoken English contemporary art critic

David Lee (born 1953) is an outspoken English contemporary art critic—condemning conceptual art in general and the Turner Prize in particular. He publishes and edits The Jackdaw magazine, critical of the contemporary art world.

== Career ==
David Lee was editor of Art Review magazine, but left to found his own satirical, opinionated, often vitriolic, magazine The Jackdaw to continue his campaign at what he sees as unacceptable standards in the art world. The Jackdaw was founded in 2000, and is published six times a year.

Lee took with him from Art Review a section titled "Artbollocks", where Lee reprints what he considers to be nonsensical and pretentious use of language by critics, galleries and artists, when describing art.

He has been linked with the Stuckists art movement because of their similar response to the Young British Artists, the Turner Prize and conceptual art. However, he is equally opposed to their art and, when the Stuckists offered a donation of work to the Tate Gallery, he declared: "If the Tate accepts these ridiculous daubs The Jackdaw will dance naked – except for his favourite swastika armband – down Whitehall singing Mamma Mia."

He called the Charles Saatchi's New Blood exhibition in 2004, "an assortment of tricks and stunts that was promoted with desperation and hitherto unsuspected tastelessness ... He promoted a rotten, talentless painter called Stella Vine to public notoriety".

Lee acted as "an independent art critic" for a task in the British 'Big Brother' TV show, broadcast 2 July 2009, where he judged three pieces, two of which were done by housemates and the third by a six-year-old child. Though Lee was told all three were by housemates, he still judged the six-year-old's the worst.

Lee has been one of the three judges on the BBC2 art series, Show Me the Monet.
