= Michael R. Lehnert =

United States Marine Corps general

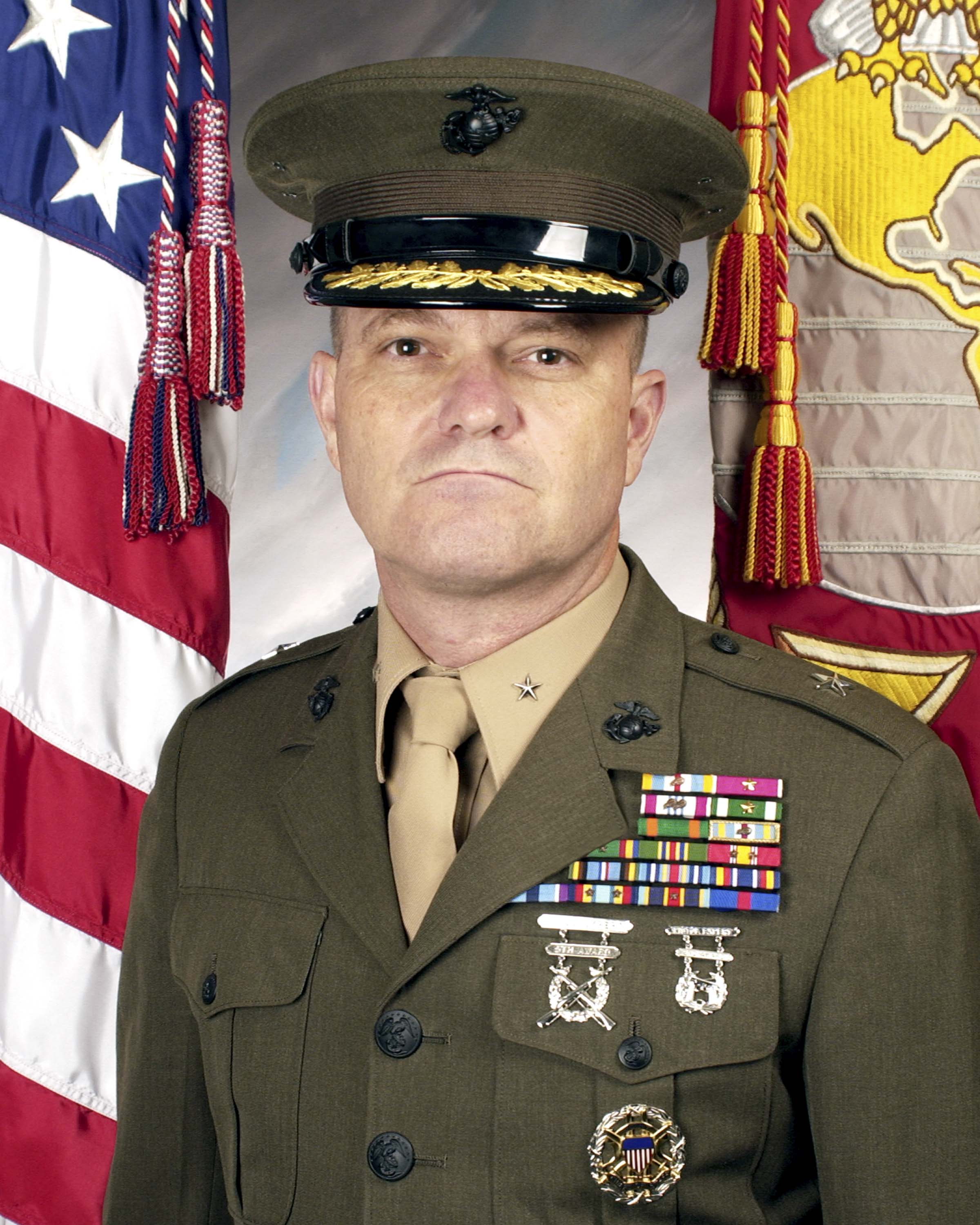
- Michael R. Lehnert
- Military career
- Allegiance: United States of America
- Branch: United States Marine Corps
- Service years: 1973–2009
- Rank: Major General
- Conflicts: Operation Iraqi Freedom
- Awards: Defense Superior Service Medal; Legion of Merit (2)

Michael R. Lehnert is a retired major general of the United States Marine Corps. He supervised the construction and served as the first commandant of the Guantanamo Bay Detention Camp.

Lehnert graduated from Central Michigan University in 1973 with a Bachelor of Arts degree in history and was commissioned a Second Lieutenant through the Platoon Leader Course program.

After completing The Basic School in Quantico, Virginia, he was transferred to Camp Lejeune, North Carolina. Assignments at Camp Lejeune included: engineer platoon commander and maintenance officer LSU-32 and S-4, H&S Battalion, 2nd FSSG. Assigned to 9th Engineer Support Battalion in Okinawa, Japan, he served as Battalion Operations Officer and finished his tour as commander Company A, 9th Engineers.

In 1977, he was ordered to Marine Barracks, Subic Bay, Republic of the Philippines as the Operations Officer. In 1978, he took command of Company A, Marine Barracks, Subic Bay.

In 1979, he attended the U.S. Army Advanced Engineer School at Fort Belvoir, Virginia. After graduation, he served as Executive Officer, USMC Recruiting Station, San Antonio, Texas.

He was transferred to Camp Pendleton, California in 1983 and held the following assignments from 1983 to 1986: Company Commander, Company C, 1st Landing Support Battalion; Commanding Officer, Combat Service Support Detachment 11; Commanding Officer, Combat Service Support Detachment 16; Executive Officer, MAU Service Support Group 17; Landing Force Support Party Cdr, BSSG 7; and MEF Engineer, First Marine Amphibious Force.

In 1987, he was selected for Armed Forces Staff College. After graduation, he was assigned to the United States Southern Command in the J-3 Operations Directorate as Chief, Central American Exercise Branch. During the Panama crisis, he participated in Operation Just Cause and Operation Promote Liberty.

He was reassigned in 1990 as Inspector-Instructor, 6th Engineer Support Battalion, Portland, Oregon. He was selected for top level school, and completed the Naval War College in 1993 with the award of a master's degree.

In 1993, he was assigned to the Joint Warfighting Center in Norfolk, Virginia where he served as the Chief of the Futures Branch, Doctrine Division.

In 1995, he reported to the 2nd Marine Aircraft Wing and participated in Operation Sea Signal, Guantanamo Bay, Cuba as Commander, Joint Task Group Bulkeley, JTF 160. Where he commanded the security forces responsible for operation of Cuban and Haitian migrant camps.

He commanded Marine Wing Support Group 27 at Cherry Point, North Carolina from May 23, 1996, to May 28, 1998. He was reassigned as the Deputy Chief of Staff, G-4 II MEF. In 1999, he deployed to Panama as the Chief of Staff, Joint Task Force Panama to oversee the final turnover of the Panama Canal and the remaining military bases.

His first tour as a general officer was at Headquarters Marine Corps, where he served as the Assistant Deputy Commandant for Installations and Logistics.

He took command of 2nd Force Service Support Group (FSSG) in July 2001 and in January 2002, he deployed to Guantanamo Bay, Cuba as Commander, Joint Task Force 160. JTF 160's mission was to construct and operate the detention facilities for Taliban and Al Qaeda detainees. While in command of the detention facility, he endeavoured to ensure that the provisions of the Geneva Convention were applied, in the face of opposition from then defense secretary Donald Rumsfeld, inviting the ICRC to visit and advise on conditions of detention, appointing a Muslim chaplain and creating an ethos of human decency. In 2003, he deployed with the 2d FSSG to the CENTCOM theater and participated in Operation Iraqi Freedom as Commander, Marine Logistics Command. He then served as Chief of Staff, United States Southern Command, Miami, Florida.

Lehnert's final Marine Corps assignment was as Commanding General, Marine Corps Installations West (MCI West), based at Marine Corps Base Camp Pendleton, California, where he had assumed command on October 21, 2005. Under Lehnert’s command, MCI West made vast developments to base infrastructure, Marine and family housing, training facilities and numerous other quality-of-life improvements for all installations in the western U.S.

Lehnert retired after 37 years of service after turning over command of MCI West to Maj. Gen. Anthony L. Jackson on September 29, 2009.

== Civilian Life ==
In 2020, Mike Lehnert joined other retired senior leaders like Retired Lt. Gen. Richard L. Kelly to speak out against the abuses of Donald Trump through Lehnert's affiliation with National Security Leaders for Biden.

In the 2024 United States presidential election, Lehnert endorsed Kamala Harris.

== Awards ==
Decorations include:

Defense Superior Service Medal w/ 1 oak leaf cluster	Legion of Merit w/ 1 award star	Defense Meritorious Service Medal w/ 2 oak leaf clusters	Navy and Marine Corps Commendation Medal w/ 1 award star	Office of the Joint Chiefs of Staff Identification Badge
Navy and Marine Corps Achievement Medal	Joint Meritorious Unit Award w/ 1 oak leaf cluster	Navy Unit Commendation w/ 1 service star	Navy Meritorious Unit Commendation	Office of the Joint Chiefs of Staff Identification Badge
National Defense Service Medal w/ 2 service stars	Armed Forces Expeditionary Medal	Global War on Terrorism Expeditionary Medal	Global War on Terrorism Service Medal	Office of the Joint Chiefs of Staff Identification Badge
Humanitarian Service Medal	Navy Sea Service Deployment Ribbon w/ 2 service stars	Navy & Marine Corps Overseas Service Ribbon w/ 1 service star	Marine Corps Recruiting Ribbon	Office of the Joint Chiefs of Staff Identification Badge
