= Karen J. Greenberg =

American historian

- Greenberg in 2010
- Born: Karen Joy Greenberg
- Education: Cornell University (B.A., History) Yale University (Ph.D., History)
- Occupations: Historian and author
- Writing career
- Notable work: Rogue Justice: The Making of the Security State

Karen Joy Greenberg is an American historian, professor, and author. She currently serves as a non-resident senior fellow at the Reiss Center on Law and Security at New York University. She was previously director of the Center on National Security at Fordham University School of Law.

== Early life and education ==
Greenberg earned a B.A. in history from Cornell University and a Ph.D. in history from Yale University.

== Career ==
Greenberg founded the Center on National Security at Fordham University School of Law in September 2011. Under Greenberg's direction, in June 2015, the Center released By the Numbers: ISIS Cases in the United States, a report that analyzed the 59 U.S. ISIS-related cases at the time. In the following year, July 2016, an updated report, Case by Case: ISIS Prosecutions in the United States, was released, showcasing over 100 cases and giving more in-depth analysis.

From 2003 to 2011, Greenberg served as the founding executive director of the Center on Law and Security at New York University School of Law. She also served as a visiting or adjunct faculty member at New York University from 1994 to 2009. She previously taught at Bard College and served as Vice President for Programs at the Soros Foundation.

Greenberg has written extensively on the Guantanamo Bay detention camp, terrorism, civil liberties, and U.S. national security. She is widely cited as a leading expert on national security and terrorism in The New York Times, The Washington Post, the Los Angeles Times, The Guardian, Mother Jones, The Daily Show, and many other media outlets. She is also a frequent public speaker, and hosts the SpyTalk podcast. In addition, Greenberg has observed numerous terrorism trials and hearings, including the Sulaiman Abu Ghaith trial in 2014.

She is a permanent member of the Council on Foreign Relations.

== Published works ==
- Our Nation at Risk: Election Integrity as a National Security Issue (2024)
- Subtle Tools: The Dismantling of American Democracy from the War on Terror to Donald Trump (2021)
- Reimagining the National Security State: Liberalism on the Brink (2019)
- Rogue Justice: The Making of the Security State (2016)
- The Least Worst Place: Guantanamo's First 100 Days (2009)
- The Enemy Combatant Papers: American Justice, the Courts and the War on Terror (2008)
- The Torture Papers: The Road to Abu Ghraib (2005)
- Al Qaeda Now (2005)
- The Torture Debate in America (2005)
