= The Torture Papers (book) =

The Torture Papers: The Road To Abu Ghraib
- Author: Karen J. Greenberg, Joshua L. Dratel
- Publisher: Cambridge University Press
- Publication date: 2005
- Pages: 1,249
- ISBN: 978-0-521-85324-8

The Torture Papers: The Road To Abu Ghraib is a book about the use of controversial techniques in the interrogation and detention of captives of the US. The book is a collection of documents, edited by Karen J. Greenberg and Joshua L. Dratel, two authors who have worked together on several books.

Greenberg is Director of the Center on National Security at Fordham University's School of Law, and the former Executive Director of the Center on Law and Security at New York University's School of Law. Dratel has worked on behalf of captives of the US in the "war on terror".

== Awards and Commendations ==
- The Globe and Mail included The Torture Papers in its list of 100 books for 2005, where Wesley Wark describes the book as a "public service."
- 2005 Award for Excellence in Professional and Scholarly Publishing in the law category
