= James J. Malloy =

Retired American admiral (b. 1963)

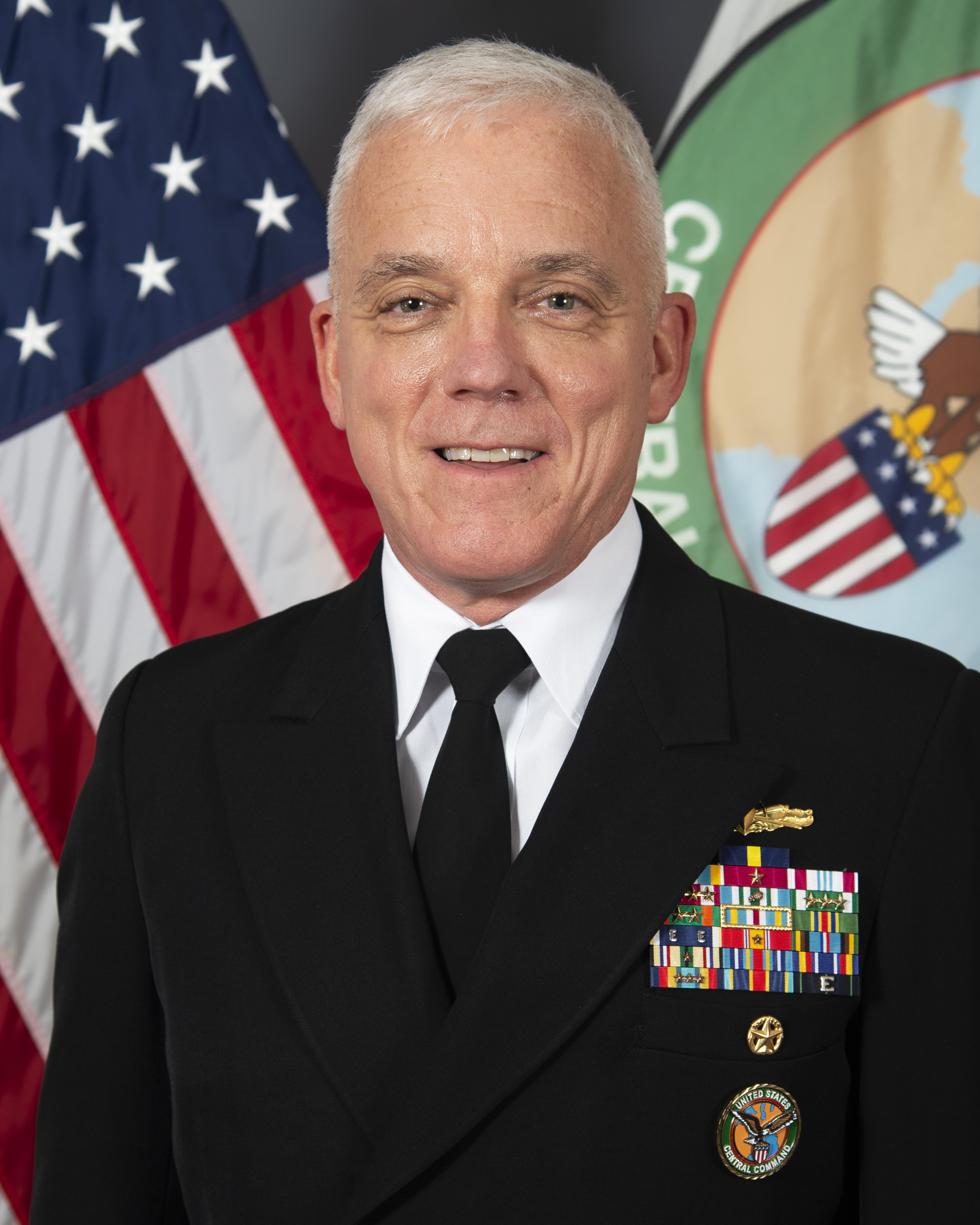
- Born: 1963 (age 62–63); Silver Spring, Maryland, U.S.
- Military career
- Allegiance: United States
- Branch: United States Navy
- Service years: 1986–2022
- Rank: Vice Admiral
- Commands: United States Naval Forces Central Command; United States Fifth Fleet; Carrier Strike Group 10; Destroyer Squadron 50; USS Pinckney; USS Falcon
- Conflicts: Operation Inherent Resolve
- Awards: Navy Distinguished Service Medal; Defense Superior Service Medal (3); Legion of Merit (2)

James Joseph Malloy (born 1963) is a retired vice admiral in the United States Navy, who last served as Deputy Commander, United States Central Command from September 21, 2020, to July 2022.

Malloy served as the Commander United States Naval Forces Central Command/United States Fifth Fleet. He assumed command on December 7, 2018, following the death of Scott Stearney. He previously served as Deputy Chief of Naval Operations for Operations, Plans and Strategy. Malloy was commissioned upon his graduation from United States Naval Academy in 1986. He holds an M.S. degree in systems technology (command, control and communications) from the Naval Postgraduate School, an M.S. degree in national security strategy from the National War College and a Master of Health Sciences degree in emergency and disaster management from Touro University.

== Awards and decorations ==

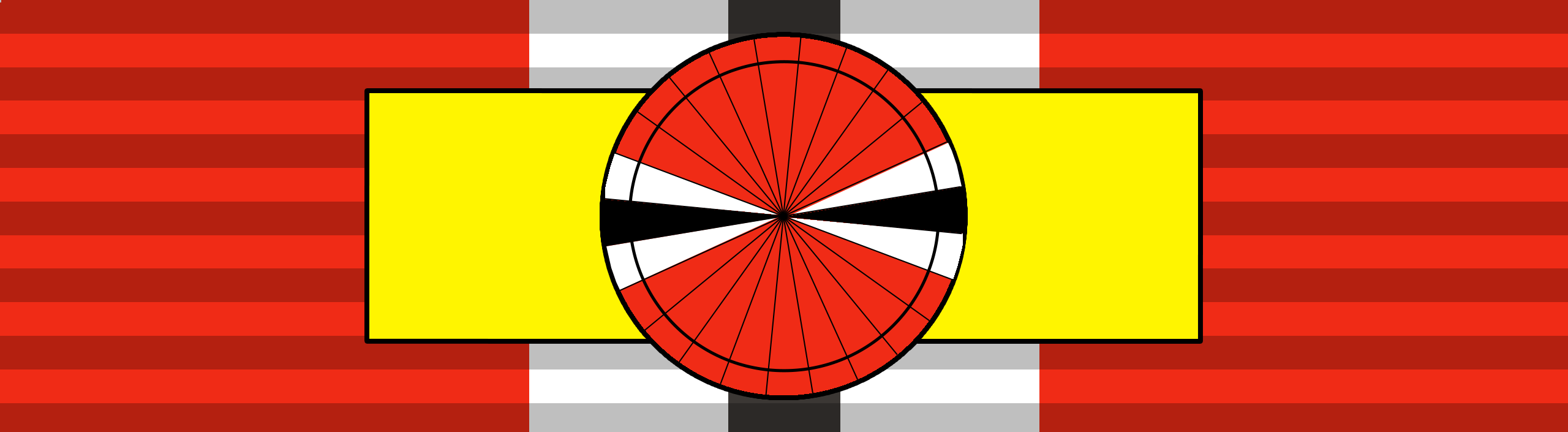

Surface Warfare Officer Pin
Navy Distinguished Service Medal		Defense Superior Service Medal with two bronze oak leaf clusters
Legion of Merit with one gold award star	Defense Meritorious Service Medal	Meritorious Service Medal w/ 4 award stars
Joint Service Commendation Medal w/ oak leaf cluster	Navy and Marine Corps Commendation Medal w/ 3 award stars	Navy and Marine Corps Achievement Medal w/ 2 award stars
Joint Meritorious Unit Award	Navy Meritorious Unit Commendation	Navy "E" Ribbon with 2 Battle E devices
National Defense Service Medal with one bronze service star	Armed Forces Expeditionary Medal	Southwest Asia Service Medal with 1 service star
Global War on Terrorism Expeditionary Medal	Global War on Terrorism Service Medal	Navy Sea Service Deployment Ribbon w/ 3 service stars
Navy and Marine Corps Overseas Service Ribbon	The Khalifiyyeh Order of Bahrain, 1st class	Navy Expert Rifleman Medal
Command at Sea insignia
United States Central Command Badge

Military offices
Preceded by Bradley Mai	Commodore of Destroyer Squadron 50; 2010–2011	Succeeded by Edward Cashman
Preceded by Jesse A. Wilson Jr.	Commander of Carrier Strike Group 10; 2016–2017	Succeeded by Samuel Paparo
Preceded by Andrew L. Lewis	Vice Director of Operations of the Joint Staff; 2017–2018	Succeeded by James Hecker
Preceded by Andrew L. Lewis	Deputy Chief of Naval Operations for Operations, Plans and Strategy of the United States Navy; 2018	Succeeded by Stuart B. Munsch
Preceded by Paul J. Schlise; Acting	Commander of the United States Naval Forces Central Command; 2018–2020	Succeeded by Samuel Paparo
Preceded by Paul J. Schlise; Acting	Commander of the United States Fifth Fleet; 2018–2020	Succeeded by Samuel Paparo
Preceded by Thomas W. Bergeson	Deputy Commander of the United States Central Command; 2020–2022	Succeeded by Gregory M. Guillot
