= 2024 South Korean drone intrusion incident in North Korea =

In October 2024, North Korea accused South Korea of flying drones into the airspace over Chung-guyok, Pyongyang and dropping a large number of anti-North Korea political propaganda leaflets between 3 to 10 October. This incident ultimately led to the destruction of the Gyeongui Line and Donghae Line railways located in North Korea, further deteriorating inter-Korean relations and causing tensions on the Korean Peninsula.

The North Korean government later requested the International Civil Aviation Organization (ICAO) to intervene in the investigation, but the request was rejected due to a lack of conclusive evidence in April 2025. Investigations into the martial law crisis in South Korea revealed that President Yoon Suk Yeol had attempted to use the incident to incite North Korea to attack South Korea, but that this failed.

== Background ==
Both the South Korean and North Korean governments have opposed the ongoing balloon propaganda campaign. The South Korean government, concerned about freedom of speech, has never decisively interfered with the balloon releases by activists, but has taken some measures, including prohibiting the use of boats to release balloons, which greatly reduced the number of propaganda leaflets flying into North Korea. On the other hand, since the Sunshine Policy was promulgated, the two governments have reduced the organisation of psychological warfare, but tensions have re-emerged.

From 2016 to 2017, North Korea retaliated by airdropping 1,000 propaganda balloons into South Korea. However, since North Korea announced its abandonment of unification, North Korea's aversion to South Korea's balloon propaganda campaign has increased day by day, and it has called the propaganda items dropped by South Korea into North Korea "dirty items" and "despicable psychological warfare conspiracy". In order to counter South Korea's balloon propaganda campaign, North Korean Vice Minister of Defence Kim Kang-il announced that he would drop a considerable amount of waste paper and garbage in the border and interior areas between North Korea and South Korea, with the aim of "making South Korea realise that cleaning up these waste papers and garbage is a waste of manpower and resources".

== Events ==
On 11 October 2024, the Ministry of Foreign Affairs of North Korea made a statement criticising South Korea, stating that the South Korean government flew drones into the airspace of Chung-guyok and Pyongyang between 3 October and 10 October, airdropping a large number of anti-North Korea black propaganda leaflets, as well as engaging in military provocation. As North Korea was not satisfied, South Korean Defence Minister Kim Yong-hyun attended the National Assembly's audit of the military court and stated in response to related questions that the South Korean military had not infiltrated North Korea with drones, and the Joint Chiefs of Staff also stated that it would confirm whether it was done by a civilian organisation. Subsequently, Kim Yo Jong, Deputy Director of the Central Committee of the Workers' Party of Korea, issued a statement saying that the South Korean government's statement that "the military has not sent drones to North Korea," and that "it is necessary to confirm whether it was done by a civilian organisation" was an attempt to shirk its responsibility, and that it would retaliate if South Korean drones reappeared in Pyongyang. The North Korean Ministry of National Defence responded to the South Korean Ministry of National Defence's position by saying that it held an ambiguous attitude of neither denying nor admitting the situation and was hesitant about whether civilian groups had the equipment to fly drones over Pyongyang. Afterwards, Kim Yo Jong made another statement regarding South Korea's sending drones to North Korea, saying that "the South Korean government is the culprit and the US government should bear the relevant responsibility."

Kim Yo Jong then issued another statement on 15 October, stating "there is sufficient evidence that the drone flight was carried out by South Korea and that South Korea will pay a heavy price". On the same day, the South Korean Joint Chiefs of Staff sent a message to the media confirming that North Korea had blown up a section of the Gyeongui Line and the East Sea Line north of the Military Demarcation Line at noon on the same day.

== Investigation ==
TV Chosun reported that a civilian organisation attempted to use drones to distribute leaflets. According to the content of the leaflets dropped by drones released by North Korea, the top of the leaflets read "Kim Jong Un only wants to line his own pockets," along with photos of Kim Jong Un wearing what appears to be a Swiss IWC Schaffhausen watch and his daughter Kim Ju Ae wearing a French luxury Dior coat. The leaflets also compared the amount of white rice and corn that South Korean and North Korean citizens could buy with their annual incomes, and the bottom of the leaflets read "North Korea's economic situation is like hell". The Free North Korea Movement Alliance stated that they did not launch any drones this year and would not take any responsibility for this. The Korea Unification Association stated that they had not heard of any defector groups distributing such leaflets. Lee Han-byung, a non-executive member of the National Human Rights Commission of Korea and a representative of the North Korean Human Rights Promotion Centre, further pointed out that it was unnatural that these leaflets were not sent along with K-pop and Korean dramas on a USB flash drive.

Kim Yeol-soo, director of the Security Strategy Department of the Korea Military Research Institute, pointed out that the drone used stingray support wings, which are similar to the SKY-09 high-altitude drone manufactured by the People's Republic of China and seem to be the same as the North Korean drone that crashed in Ulleungdo and Paju in 2014. (Note: The drone unveiled on South Korea's Armed Forces Day is designated "S-BAT." It underwent its first test flight in October 2020 and is scheduled to officially enter service in 2023. The drone has a maximum loiter time of 4 hours and a top speed of 140 kilometers per hour, enabling it to covertly perform long-range reconnaissance and surveillance missions.。) It is difficult to regard it as a drone used by civilian organisations, and it is also far removed from drones issued by the armed forces. In order to clarify the situation related to China's actions, the North Korean government ordered the Ministry of State Security, together with the security bureaus of North Pyongan Province and other provincial border areas, to investigate the cadres of all units that had business dealings with the People's Republic of China.

Hong Min, head of the North Korea Research Office at the Institute for Unification Studies, pointed out that it is difficult for ordinary people to make drones travel a straight distance of about 150 kilometres from Paju to Pyongyang. The drones that flew over Pyongyang were actually the same model and specifications as the small drones used by the UAV Operations Command for long-range reconnaissance. Park Won-gon, a professor in the Department of North Korea Studies at Ewha Womans University, said that because the drones are relatively small, they are rarely displayed directly on the radar, so they can achieve the purpose of infiltration to a low degree. Regarding the drones that entered Pyongyang, Yu Yong-won, a member of the National Assembly from the People Power Party of South Korea, analyzed the photos of drones identified by North Korea using thermal imaging surveillance equipment and found that although the wing shape of the drones was similar to that of the drones of the South Korean UAV Operations Command, the fuselage behind the wings was shorter and there were 3D printing marks. Until martial law was declared in South Korea in 2024, Hong Min provided three pieces of evidence that had not been made public before, stating, "How could ordinary civilians' drones not be detected by the South Korean military when they fly to the military demarcation line?"

On 19 October, the North Korean Ministry of National Defense and the Ministry of State Security released photos and an investigation report of the drone that crashed on 13 October, indicating that the drone was a "small drone for long-range reconnaissance" equipped by North Korea's drone combat command, the same type of drone that was publicly displayed on a vehicle by the North Korean military on 13 October. They also inferred that the drone was likely involved in the leaflet drop in downtown Pyongyang. Aleksandr Matsegora, the Russian ambassador to North Korea, said in an interview that "in fact, around 0:30 on the evening of 8 to 9 October, I saw a drone flying over Pyongyang." The Joint Chiefs of Staff said that "North Korea's unilateral claims are not worth confirming or responding to." Kim Hyung-soo, commander of the North Korean Air Force Combat Command, said in an interview with the National Assembly's Defence Committee that after intensive tracking and analysis by the military and other government agencies, "no drone flew over North Korea."

Yu Yong-won released additional investigation data, stating that although the North Korean government had disclosed aircraft similar to those used by the South Korean Air Force, it had not disclosed any analytical data such as internal GPS navigation system records. Moreover, there are many drones with similar shapes in the domestic and foreign civilian sectors. "Based on comparative analysis, the drones disclosed are likely to be replicas manufactured in North Korea." Jeong Sang-chang, director of the Korean Peninsula Strategy Center of the Sejong Institute, countered that "this is unlikely to be a self-directed farce," because the incident shocked the top leadership of the North Korean government by passing through the office of North Korean leader Kim Jong Un, and that is why it appeared on the front page of the North Korean media in a rare manner to highlight the importance the North Korean government attached to the matter.

On 28 October, the North Korean government released the final investigation report on the drone, stating that the drone took off from Baengnyeongdo at 23:25:30 on 8 October, flew over the waters around Jangyon County and Chōdo Island in South Hwanghae Province, and then changed its route to the waters around Namchōa Island. It arrived over the North Korean Ministry of Foreign Affairs building and Victory Metro Station at 1:32:08 the next day, and dropped black political leaflets over the North Korean Ministry of National Defence building at 1:35:11. According to the investigation, the drone had 238 flight plans and records between 5 June, 2023 and 8 October, 2024. Except for the flight record on 8 October, the rest were all within South Korea. Kim Yo Jong, vice minister of the Central Committee of the Workers' Party of Korea, said that "the South Korean military did not respond without our report because they thought that the drone came from South Korea as a hypothetical situation, but I really want to see how they would react if this situation actually happened." Lee Sung-joon, chief of the Joint Chiefs of Staff's press office, said at a regular press conference on the same day that "the drone from Baengnyeong Island" was a unilateral claim by North Korea and was not worth confirming or responding to. He also responded to "Kim Yo-jong's statement implying retaliation", saying that "if North Korean drones infiltrate South Korea, the South Korean military will take corresponding measures to protect the lives and property of its citizens."

On 10 February, 2025, the South Korean government finally stated that it had received a request from the North Korean government through the International Civil Aviation Organisation (ICAO) to intervene in the investigation of whether the incident violated Article 8 of the Chicago Convention, and stated that the South Korean government had prepared a response plan to the North Korean government's request. The ICAO Council held a closed-door meeting on 1 April 2025 to review the case. The North Korean government participated in the meeting via video and did not send a representative to the meeting. After review by the 36 member states, it was determined that the North Korean government did not have conclusive evidence, and therefore unanimously decided not to adopt the North Korean government's claims and not to accept the relevant investigation request.

On 22 July, 2025, a South Korean military official provided information to Yonhap News Agency, revealing that Kim Yong-hyun violated the wishes of the Joint Chiefs of Staff by issuing an order to drop drones on Pyongyang. The Joint Chiefs of Staff accepted and carried out Kim Yong-hyun's order under duress. The official also stated that after the North Korean government made the South Korean drone infiltration incident public, Kim Yong-hyun still indicated that he would continue to drop drones on North Korea. Under the opposition of the Joint Chiefs of Staff, Kim Yong-hyun changed the target to drop drones on Nampo. Yonhap News Agency speculated that at the time, the Chairman of the Joint Chiefs of Staff, Kim Myung-soo, and the Chief of Operations of the Joint Chiefs of Staff, Lee Seung-oh, believed that if South Korea dropped drones on North Korea, it would not only anger North Korea but also violate the Korean Armistice Agreement, and therefore expressed their opposition. On 17 July, 2025, the Chief of Operations of the Joint Chiefs of Staff, Lee Seung-oh, told the independent investigation team investigating Yoon Seok-youl's sedition that the drones were dropped on North Korea according to Kim Yong-hyun's instructions.

On 15 December, 2025, the independent prosecutor's team in the South Korean civil strife and treason case stated that Yoon Suk-yeol attempted to provoke North Korea into taking military action by using demilitarised means to pave the way for the implementation of martial law. The South Korean military subsequently launched drones to infiltrate Pyongyang in an attempt to provoke North Korea, but the plan failed due to the negative attitude of the Joint Chiefs of Staff and the lack of response from North Korea.

== Aftermath ==
=== Gaffe controversy ===
Shin Won-sik, head of the Office of National Security of South Korea, appeared on a KBS TV current affairs program on 13 October and said that North Korea's accusation that the drone flew over its airspace was "deliberately causing internal conflict in South Korea" and that the best way to deal with it was to "ignore it". Hong Min, head of the North Korea Research Office of the Institute for Unification, pointed out that "from North Korea's point of view, the drone entered the airspace where Kim Jong Un was located, which is obviously a violation of the armistice agreement" and criticized the South Korean government for continuing to make statements that insulted the Kim Jong Un regime, which instead gave North Korea room to retaliate.

=== International reaction ===
On 14 October, the U.S. military in South Korea announced that the AH-64 shooting exercise near the Military Demarcation Line had been fully normalised, marking the resumption of the exercise after a six-year hiatus. United States Indo-Pacific Command Commander Samuel Paparo made an emergency inspection of Panmunjom after North Korea claimed that a South Korean drone had flown over Pyongyang. After North Korea reported that a drone had flown over Pyongyang, the United Nations Command stated that it would conduct a strict investigation into the matter in accordance with the Korean Armistice Agreement. On October 14, the Russian Foreign Ministry echoed the North Korean government's claims, stating that "sending drones to Pyongyang to distribute anti-North Korean leaflets" was an infringement on North Korean sovereignty and an interference in its internal affairs.

=== Public reaction ===
Kim Jin-hyang, a member of the Korean Fatherland Reform Party and an expert on North Korea, said that the South Korean military could not send out drones on its own and that they should have been sent by the ROK/US Combined Forces Command, thereby criticising the Yoon Suk-yeol government for its incompetence on the North Korea issue. The Christian Council of Korea issued a statement demanding that the Ministry of National Defence disclose the truth of the incident and urging both sides to stop all hostile actions and provocations.

== Relation to the 2024 martial law plot ==
After the 2024 South Korean martial law crisis, JTBC published an exclusive report on 7 December, citing an investigation by the Democratic Party of Korea, stating that South Korean Defence Minister Kim Yong-hyun planned for the commander of the National Army's Defence Counterintelligence Command, Yeo In-hyung, to direct the incident—the drone flying over North Korea. The day after this report was published, the warehouse of the Drone Operations Command caught fire. On 2 January, 2025, JTBC followed up with a report disclosing documents from the Drone Operations Command, stating that the drone flying over North Korea was an operational plan directly issued by the President through the National Security Office. The Senior Public Officials Crime Investigation Service finally confirmed on 12 January that the Drone Operations Command destroyed internal data, and the content of the relevant evidence was related to the Yoon Suk-yeol government's attempt to "use the north wind" (Note: "North Wind" (Korean: 북풍) refers to a fabricated campaign orchestrated by conservative political groups in South Korea through illegal collusion with Pyongyang. Its aim was to influence public opinion and hinder the progressive camp's election victory.) to prove the rationality of declaring martial law.

The Democratic Party then revealed the "Martial Law Division-Joint Investigation Headquarters Operation Reference Materials" compiled by Yeo In-hyeong which stated that "in the event of an armed conflict with North Korea, in order to simultaneously implement military response and internal security control, we should consider 'issuing martial law and joint defense orders at the same time'." It also stated that Kim Yong-hyun instructed the Joint Chiefs of Staff to "if North Korea sends garbage balloons to South Korea again, we should first fire warning shots and then attack the location where North Korea released the garbage balloons." However, the Joint Chiefs of Staff denied receiving any instructions from Kim Yong-hyun and stated that "the military has discussed various contingency measures and plans." During the post-martial law investigation in South Korea in 2024, the notebook of Roh Sang-won, former commander of the South Korean National Army Intelligence Command, contained the phrase "inducing North Korea to launch an attack on the Northern Limit Line." The manual also contained phrases such as "garbage balloons," raising questions about whether the plan was to "use the north wind" to infiltrate Pyongyang with drones and launch a ground attack on North Korea's garbage balloons to provoke a military conflict between the two Koreas and thus declare martial law. The Joint Chiefs of Staff refuted this, stating that the "ground attack" that "first fired warning shots and then attacked the location where North Korea launched garbage balloons" was not carried out because it was strongly opposed during internal discussions.

Continuing the line of the documents released by JTBC, another drone was found at 4:22 a.m. the day after the incident on a bicycle path next to the Imjin River in Yeoncheon County, Gyeonggi Province. The Joint Chiefs of Staff recovered the drone on its own without initiating a formal joint investigation, and did not conduct any approval process. The intelligence chiefs of the National Army Anti-Espionage Command and the Yeoncheon Police Station's guard and jurisdiction brigade participated in the entire drone recovery process. Afterwards, when the National Assembly of South Korea investigated issues such as "whether drones were sent to North Korea" and "whether the Yeoncheon drones warmed up bilateral relations", it requested the records and contents of the Korean National Police Agency. The Joint Chiefs of Staff immediately conveyed a document to the Korean National Police Agency prohibiting the disclosure of secret matters. This was criticised by National Assembly member Yoon Geon-young for the South Korean government's attempt to hide important clues in the case and its eagerness to cover up the truth of the incident. On 14 January, Kim Myong-su, chairman of the Joint Chiefs of Staff, attended a meeting of the National Assembly's special committee on "investigating the truth of the declaration of martial law and the instigation of civil unrest". He emphasized that "there was no so-called 'North Wind Plan' during the period of martial law" and countered by asking, "Why should we do things for Kim Jong Un of North Korea, who needs to pay for confirmation himself?" "The reason we said 'we could not confirm' at the time was a military strategy of 'card game' that profited from creating psychological pressure and confusion on the other side while protecting our secrets. If someone tells the other side what my cards are, or says that we will see everything after the investigation, we will not win the game."

The high similarity between the drone that crashed near the Imjin River and the drone that was found in Pyongyang has caused controversy. The Joint Chiefs of Staff only responded that there are similarities and said that they could not specify the similarities. SBS "Want to Know the Truth" quoted Seo Il-soo, the director of the Korean Unmanned Aviation Education Institute, as saying that the drone found in Pyongyang and the drone that the South Korean Army showed up on Sunday also have the same appearance. The South Korean media Pressian continued the content of SBS's program and interviewed former Minister of Unification Chung Se-hyun by phone. He said that if North Korea really used force, the shells would fall on Yeonpyeong Island or the northern land of Gyeonggi Province, which would be the best time for the Yun Seok-youl government to declare martial law on the grounds of foreign invasion.

Regarding the suspicion that the Yoon Suk-yeol government sent drones to intrude into North Korean airspace in an attempt to provoke North Korea into retaliation, the South Korean Special Prosecutor's Team for Internal Strife stated on 4 July, 2025 that it was investigating Yoon Suk-yeol for possible treason.

On 12 June 2026, the 36th Criminal Division of the Seoul Central District Court ruled in the first instance that the incident was an action aimed at creating an emergency declaration of martial law, and added that "it cannot be regarded as a legitimate military action," sentencing Yoon Seok-yeol to 30 years in prison, former Minister of National Defense Kim Yong-hyun to 30 years in prison, former Commander of the National Army Anti-Espionage Command Yoo In-hyung to 15 years in prison, and former Commander of Unmanned Aerial Vehicle Operations Kim Yong-dae to 3 years in prison and suspended for 5 years.
