= Jeffrey Harbeson =

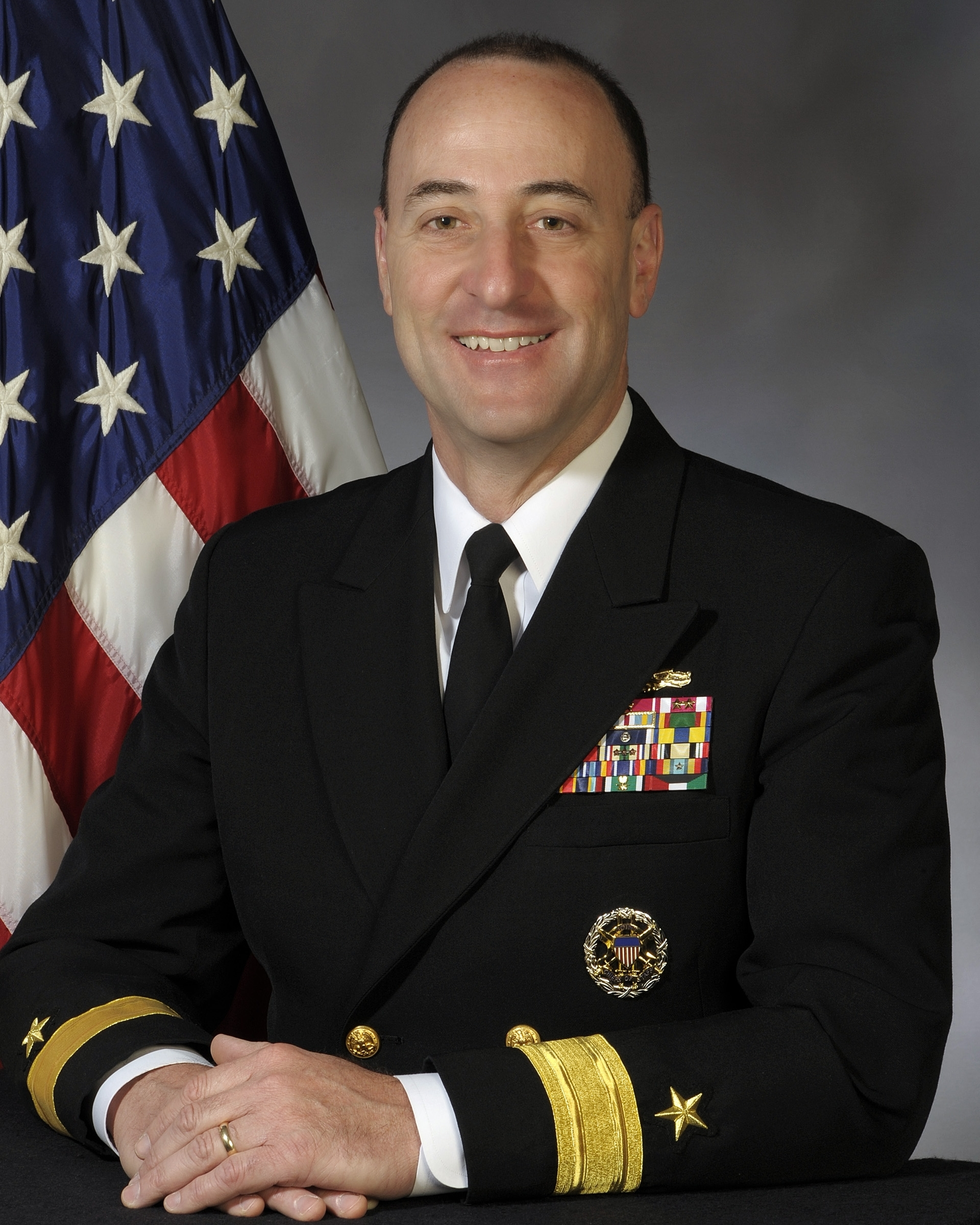
- Born: 1956 (age 69–70)
- Military career
- Branch: United States Navy
- Service years: 1982–2014
- Rank: Rear Admiral
- Commands: USS John S. McCain (DDG-56); Destroyer Squadron 50; Joint Task Force Guantanamo

Jeffrey Harbeson (born 1956) is a retired United States Navy officer. He is notable for being denied a visa to visit Russia due to concerns his appointment as a commandant of Joint Task Force Guantanamo, the organization that runs the Guantanamo Bay detention camps required him to oversee human rights abuses. In June 2010 Rear Admiral Harbeson replaced Rear Admiral Thomas H. Copeman III.

Harbeson was previously assigned to the Office of the Chief of Naval Operations in Washington.

Secretary of Defense Robert Gates nominated Harbeson and 41 other Captains for promotion to rear admiral in June 2009.

Earlier in his career he had commanded Destroyer Squadron 50, and the USS John S. McCain (DDG-56) in Japan.

Harbeson joined the Navy in 1982, after completing a degree at the University of Maryland.

In 1994, when he was a Lieutenant Commander, he attended the Navy War College, where he wrote a paper entitled: "The Vicksburg campaign -- Command and control of a successful joint operation". He graduated with an M.A. degree in national security and strategic studies.

He relinquished command of JTF Guantanamo to Rear Admiral David B. Woods in August 2011. After his term at Guantanamo Harbeson became a staff officer for the Joint Chiefs of Staff—the Deputy Director for politico-military affairs for Europe, NATO and Russia.

In January 2013 Russia declined to issue Harbeson a visa, claiming he oversaw human rights abuses while commanding Joint Task Force Guantanamo. The Russian actions were described as a reaction to the passage by the US Congress of the Magnitsky Act. Magnitsky was a Russian attorney who died in Russian custody in 2009. He was described in the US as being an innocent man, who was arrested after trying to use the Russian legal system to pursue corrupt Russian officials. The Magnitsky Act authorized US officials to publish the names, and to bar from admission to the US, any Russian officials who had played a role in Magnitsky's arrest, interrogation, or long detention without trial. It was the position of Russian president Vladimir Putin that the US was hypocritical to accuse Russia of human rights abuses, given its own record of detainee abuse. Harbeson was one of approximately 60 American officials barred from admission to Russia. On April 13, 2013, Harbeson was on a list released by the Russian Federation of Americans banned from entering the country over their alleged human rights violations. The list was a direct response to the so-called Magnitsky list revealed by the United States the day before.
