= Paul J. Schlise =

U.S. Navy admiral

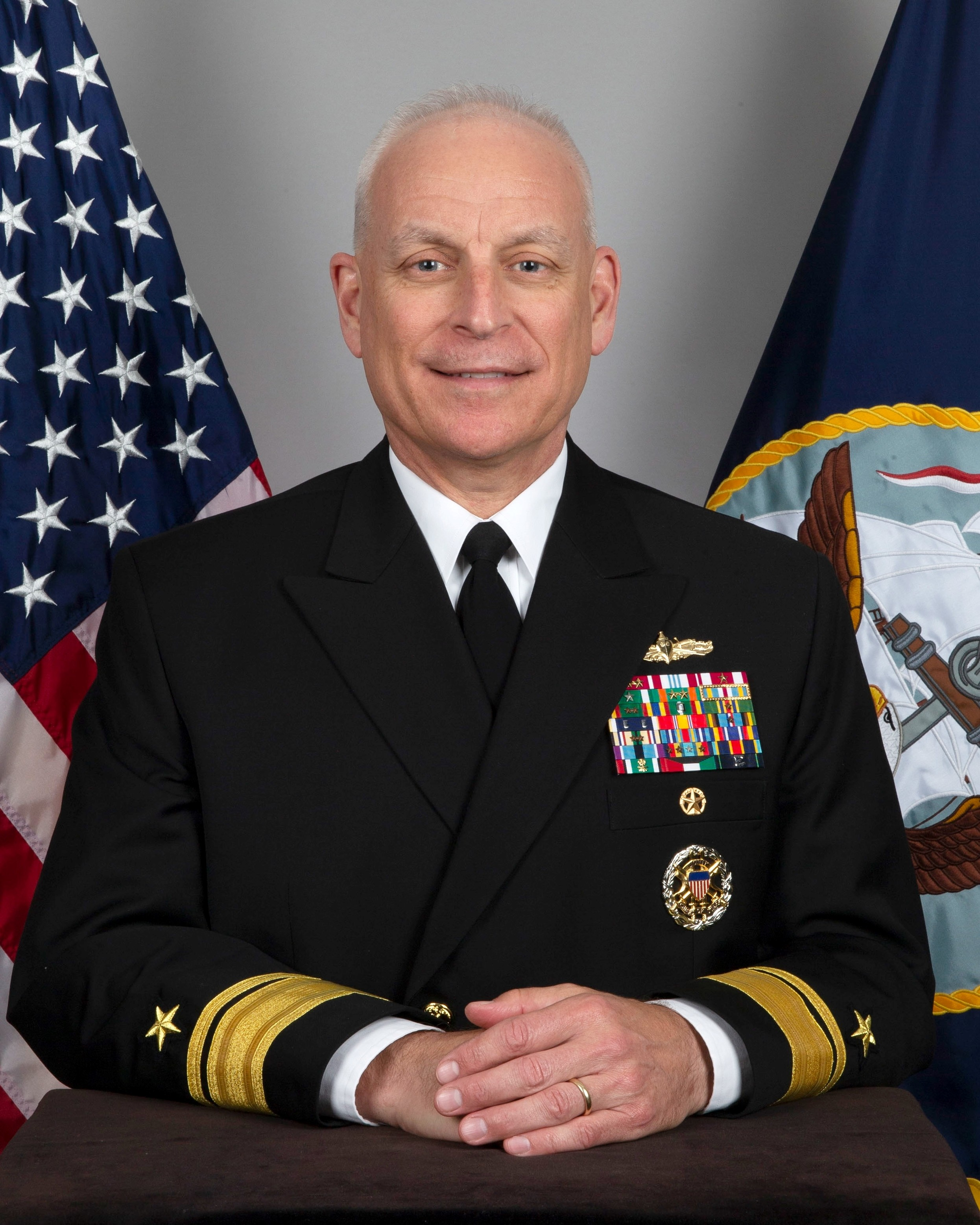
- Born: 1966 (age 59–60)
- Military career
- Allegiance: United States
- Branch: United States Navy
- Rank: Rear Admiral
- Commands: Carrier Strike Group 10; USS Halsey (DDG-97)
- Conflicts: Gulf War; War in Afghanistan
- Awards: Legion of Merit

Paul J. Schlise (born 1966) is a retired rear admiral in the United States Navy.

== Personal life ==
Schlise is originally from Sturgeon Bay, Wisconsin. He received a civilian education at Marquette University, earning a bachelor's degree from the College of Business in 1989.

== Naval career ==
Schlise was commissioned via the Naval Reserve Officers Training Corps at Marquette. His deployments include serving during the Gulf War, Operation Southern Watch, the 1998 Bombing of Iraq, Operation Enduring Freedom and Operation Tomodachi. His assignments include executive officer of the USS John Paul Jones (DDG-53), commanding officer of the USS Halsey (DDG-97) and Deputy Commander of Destroyer Squadron 7.

Schlise has been stationed at The Pentagon and graduated from the Naval War College in 2006 with a master's degree in national security and strategic studies. In 2017, he was named Deputy Commander of United States Naval Forces Central Command and the United States Fifth Fleet. He became acting commander in December 2018, following the death of Vice Admiral Scott Stearney. He assumed command of Carrier Strike Group 10 in June 2019. Schlise was succeeded by Rear Admiral Brendan R. McLane in May 2020.

Schlise previously served as director of the Surface Warfare Division in the Office of the Chief of Naval Operations. In October 2021, he was nominated for promotion to rear admiral and nominated as director of the Warfare Development Division, to which he was confirmed. He was assigned as director of the Warfare Integration Division in February 2023.

Schlise's awards include the Legion of Merit, the Defense Meritorious Service Medal, the Meritorious Service Medal with gold star, the Navy Commendation Medal with silver star and the Navy Achievement Medal with two gold stars.

Military offices
Preceded by Eugene H. Black III	Deputy Commander of the United States Naval Forces Central Command; 2017–2019	Succeeded by Curt Renshaw
Preceded by Scott Stearney	Commander of the United States Naval Forces Central Command; Acting; 2018	Succeeded by James J. Malloy
Preceded by John F. Meier	Commander of Carrier Strike Group 10; 2019–2020	Succeeded by Brendan R. McLane
Preceded by Eugene H. Black III	Director of Surface Warfare of the United States Navy; 2020–2022	Succeeded by Fred Pyle
Preceded by William D. Byrne Jr.	Assistant Deputy Chief of Naval Operations for Warfighting Development and Director of Warfare Development of the United States Navy; 2022–2023	Succeeded by Christopher J. Sweeney
Preceded by James E. Pitts	Director of Warfare Integration of the United States Navy; 2023–2024	Succeeded by Christopher J. Sweeney
