= John Bogdan =

United States Army officer

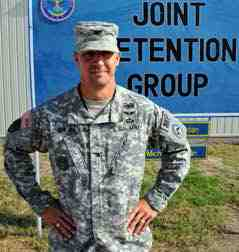
- Colonel John Bogdan
- Occupation: Military Police Officer
- Known for: Testified he was unaware Guantanamo meeting rooms were equipped to monitor captives and their lawyers

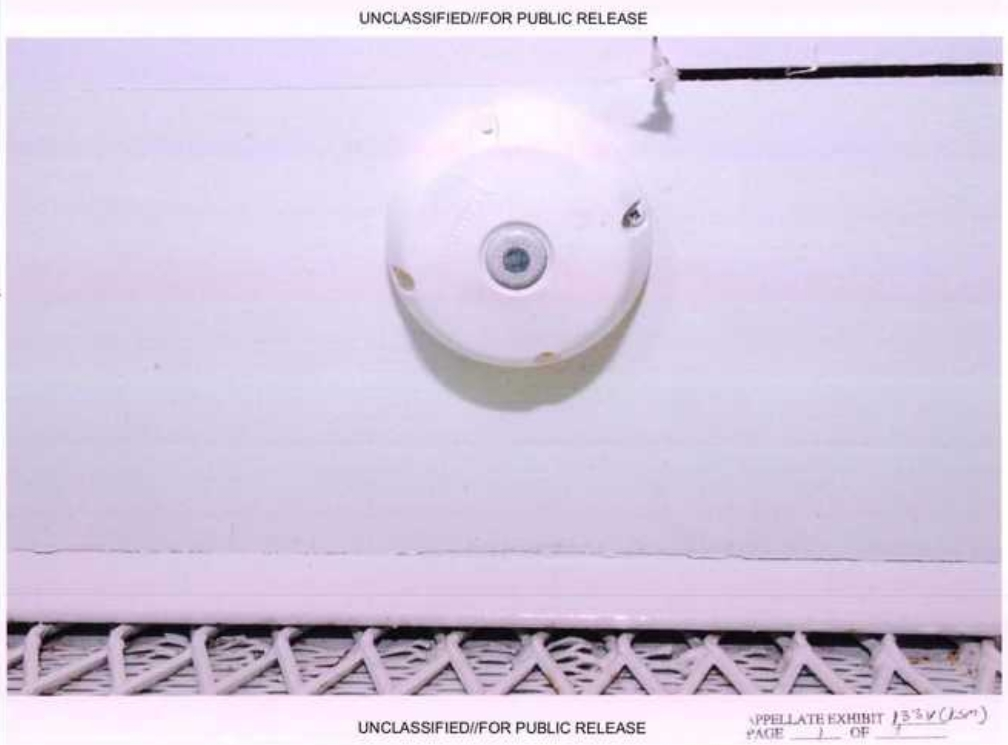
Bogdan testified he had not known that devices made to look like smoke detectors were actually listening devices, installed so intelligence analysts could eavesdrop on Guantanamo captives and their lawyers.

Colonel John Bogdan is an officer in the United States Army and former commander of the Guantanamo prison camp. He also ran detention centers in Iraq and Somalia. In 2018 Bogdan was hired by UNC Charlotte as its Associate Vice Chancellor of Safety and Security. He retired from this position in June 2024.

== Education ==
Bogdan earned an undergrad degree at Virginia Commonwealth University and Masters from Webster University and the National Defense University.

== Military career ==
John Bogdan served in several high-ranking positions. From March 2007 to March 2009 he was "Battalion Commander / Law Enforcement Operations Manager" during the U.S. occupation of Iraq. According to Bogdan's LinkedIn profile, his duties included collaborating "with senior Iraqi Police leaders to advise/assist in the development and employment of 20K Iraqi Police Officers across 50 stations" in Baghdad. Bogdan's assignments in Iraq coincided with the consolidation of Nouri al-Maliki's authoritarian regime. In 2007 and 2008 Al-Maliki, Prime Minister from 2006 to 2014, used police forces as well as regular and irregular military units to suppress rival Shi’ite factions and to drive Sunni civilians from large parts of Baghdad.

In June 2012 Bogdan took over as commander of Joint Task Force Guantanamo's Detention Group—a position sometimes called the camp's warden—from Colonel Donnie Thomas.

Within weeks, new violations of international law in relation to prisoners' rights were widely reported. In February 2013 attorneys representing Guantanamo captives confirmed one of their long-standing concerns—that the rooms where Guantanamo captives met with their clients were "bugged" (wire-tapped). When Bogdan was called to testify about this matter, he asserted that he had only recently been aware of the bugs and that they had been installed before he assumed command. He denied any knowledge of the bugs being monitored, and implied that they had been abandoned. Bogdan asserted that he had told guards "there was to be no audio monitoring of attorney-client meetings." When asked why the wiring to the bugs had recently been repaired he suggested that it may just have been for completeness, and did not confirm that the bugs were being recorded or listened to. Bogdan said he had recently locked up the power supplies for the bugs. Colonel Donnie Thomas, Bogdan's predecessor, had been aware of the bugs.

In March 2013 news broke that the most serious hunger strike in five years had begun. Writing in Time magazine, Ben Fox asserted that an intensive search ordered by Bogdan was one of the triggers for the hunger strike.

Bogdan also oversaw a violent crackdown on prisoners, in April 2013, that provoked condemnation from human-rights organizations. "U.S. forces raided Guantánamo’s showcase prison camp ... at times battling with detainees, to systematically empty communal cellblocks in an effort to end a three-month-old protest that prisoners said was sparked by mistreatment of the Quran," the military acknowledged in a statement. "Some detainees resisted with improvised weapons and, in response, four less-than-lethal rounds were fired," according to a statement issued by the prison camps at the U.S. Navy base in Cuba.

The pre-dawn operation took place hours after delegates of the International Committee of the Red Cross left the remote island prison and during a blackout of news media access to the crisis in the prison camps.

In an article in The Guardian, a lawyer for some of the men reported that Bogdan "appears to view the hunger strike as an insurrection, not a protest, and is using every trick in the book, however brutal and cruel, to put it down.... Bogdan has eliminated communal living, moving almost all detainees into isolation cells. His guards have confiscated family letters and pictures and legal materials, and even toothbrushes, toothpaste and towels. The guards prevent the men from sleeping by keeping bright lights shining all night and removing the men's eye-shades. My clients report to me that guards also deliberately make enough noise to keep the detainees awake all night, and they are chilling the detainees by keeping their cells freezing cold. In early May, when I was last at the base, Bogdan started using what amounts to religious humiliation to break the strike."

On 5 August 2013, Jason Leopold, writing in Al Jazeera, reported that Bogdan's justification for intrusive genital searches was based on the idea that there was a risk that al Qaeda would launch a frontal attack on the prison. Leopold had filed several requests to remove the redaction from claims Bogdan had made. The documents were not classified. The redactions had been justified on operational security grounds—that the camp in Cuba was at risk of a frontal attack by al Qaeda fighters.

Also in 2013, a group of military defense lawyers, in a 20 May letter to Defense Secretary Chuck Hagel, "called for an examination of Col Bogdan's fitness for command, 'based on the rapidly deteriorating detention conditions under his command and his heavy-handed response to the current hunger strike'."

On 18 December 2013, Daphne Eviatar of Human Rights First reported that, during testimony at a Military Commission, Bogdan acknowledged that prior to serving as commander of Guantanamo's Joint Detention Group, Bogdan had commanded a clandestine prison in Somalia. Eviatar described the Defense attorney concerns over new restrictions Bogdan had placed on their access to their clients, which she described as "unprecedented". Eviatar compared Bogdan's rules on attorney's access to their clients to those at US Bureau of Prisons Supermax prisons. Bogdan required attorney to apply 14 days in advance for an appointment to see their clients, while at Supermax prisons attorneys did not have to book appointments in advance. Bogdan restricted visiting hours to prior to 4 pm—prior to when many flights arrived on the distant base, while Supermax prisons allowed attorneys access to their clients up until 7 pm. Bogdan restricted the number of people who could meet with a captive to five, insufficient when defense attorney teams needed the help of paralegals and translators. Finally, Bogdan would allow no more than six captives to meet with their clients per day.

Throughout Bogdan's tenure at Guantanamo, human-rights groups including the ACLU and Amnesty International reported that numerous prisoners were innocent and/or were never charged with any crime. In March 2017 Human Rights Watch reported that, up to that date, 780 individuals had been held at Gitmo yet "731 were released without charges, many after being detained for years." Many others had been cleared for release but yet remained incarcerated. One such prisoner, Mohamedou Ould Slahi, wrote a memoir in 2015 (Guantanamo Diary) that brought wider attention to this.

== Civilian career ==
In late 2018 UNC Charlotte hired Bogdan as "Associate Vice Chancellor of Safety and Security." This is his second post-military job. His responsibilities "include police and public safety, environmental health and safety, emergency management, and risk management and insurance" as well as to "preserve the learning environment and business operations of the University." In September 2019 the student newspaper, the Niner Times, published a lengthy article, "Campus flyer implicates associate vice chancellor of human rights violations during his military service at Guantanamo Bay," detailing Bogdan's controversial career.

In October 2019 a student group called "Coalition to Remove John Bogdan" was formed. The Coalition released a statement reading, in part, "It is evident that John Bogdan and, by extension of his hire, the University and the Board of Governors have a blatant disregard for Human Rights.... this coalition calls for the immediate termination or resignation of John Bogdan from his employment within the UNC School System. We do not feel safe." UNC Charlotte said in a statement that it stands by Bogdan and that he was "robustly vetted." UNCC's statement also credited Colonel Bogdan for his "sound leadership ... during the tragedy of April 30." On that date a gunman entered a UNCC classroom and opened fire, killing two. UNCC police arrived after the incident ended.

The controversy persisted into 2020, as some faculty organizations and academic departments voiced their unease or opposition to Colonel Bogdan's hiring. UNCC responded by circulating a "Fact Set," a bulleted list containing Chancellor Phil Dubois' responses to the criticisms. The "Fact Set" stated "the enteral feeding of detainees engaged in hunger strikes has been upheld several times by the courts" and supported other practices employed during Bogdan's tenure at Gitmo, such as the use of rubber bullets and of "groin searches."

On May 21, 2024, John Bogdan announced his retirement from the University following several months of pro-Palestinian campus protests at UNC Charlotte, during which the controversy was reignited.
