= Edward Cashman (admiral) =

American naval officer

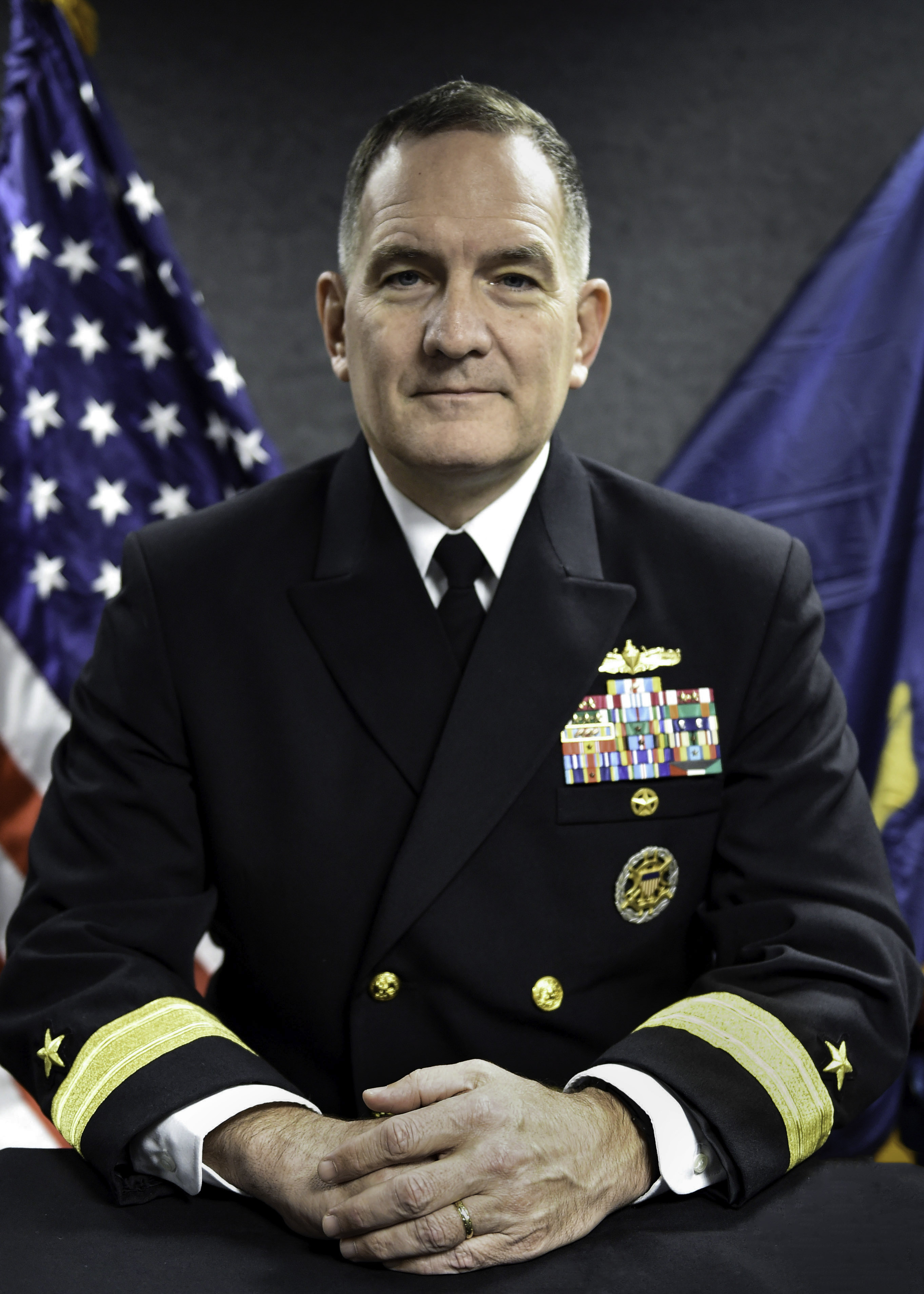
- Born: 1965 (age 60–61)
- Military career
- Service years: 1988–2020
- Rank: Rear Admiral
- Commands: Standing NATO Maritime Group 1; Joint Task Force Guantanamo; Destroyer Squadron 50; USS Mustin
- Awards: Defense Superior Service Medal; Legion of Merit

Edward Brian Cashman (born 1965) is a retired American naval officer who served as Commander, Standing NATO Maritime Group ONE in 2019.

He graduated from the Massachusetts Institute of Technology (MIT) in 1987 with a Bachelor of Science in Mechanical Engineering. He was commissioned through Navy Officer Candidate School in 1988 and holds a Master of Science in Nuclear Engineering from the University of Maryland and a Master of Arts in National Security Studies from the Naval War College in Newport, Rhode Island.

In April 2017 he was the prison camp commander for Guantanamo Bay Navy Base, appointed by President Trump. He took command of NATO's Standing NATO Maritime Group (SNMG) ONE on January 14, 2019, and then Royal Norwegian Navy Commodore Yngve Skoglund took over his command of the NATO group on December 9, 2019.

Military offices
Preceded by Anders Friis	Commander, Standing NATO Maritime Group 1 January 2019 – December 2019	Succeeded by Yngve Skoglund
