= USS Lake Champlain (CG-57) =

Ticonderoga-class cruiser

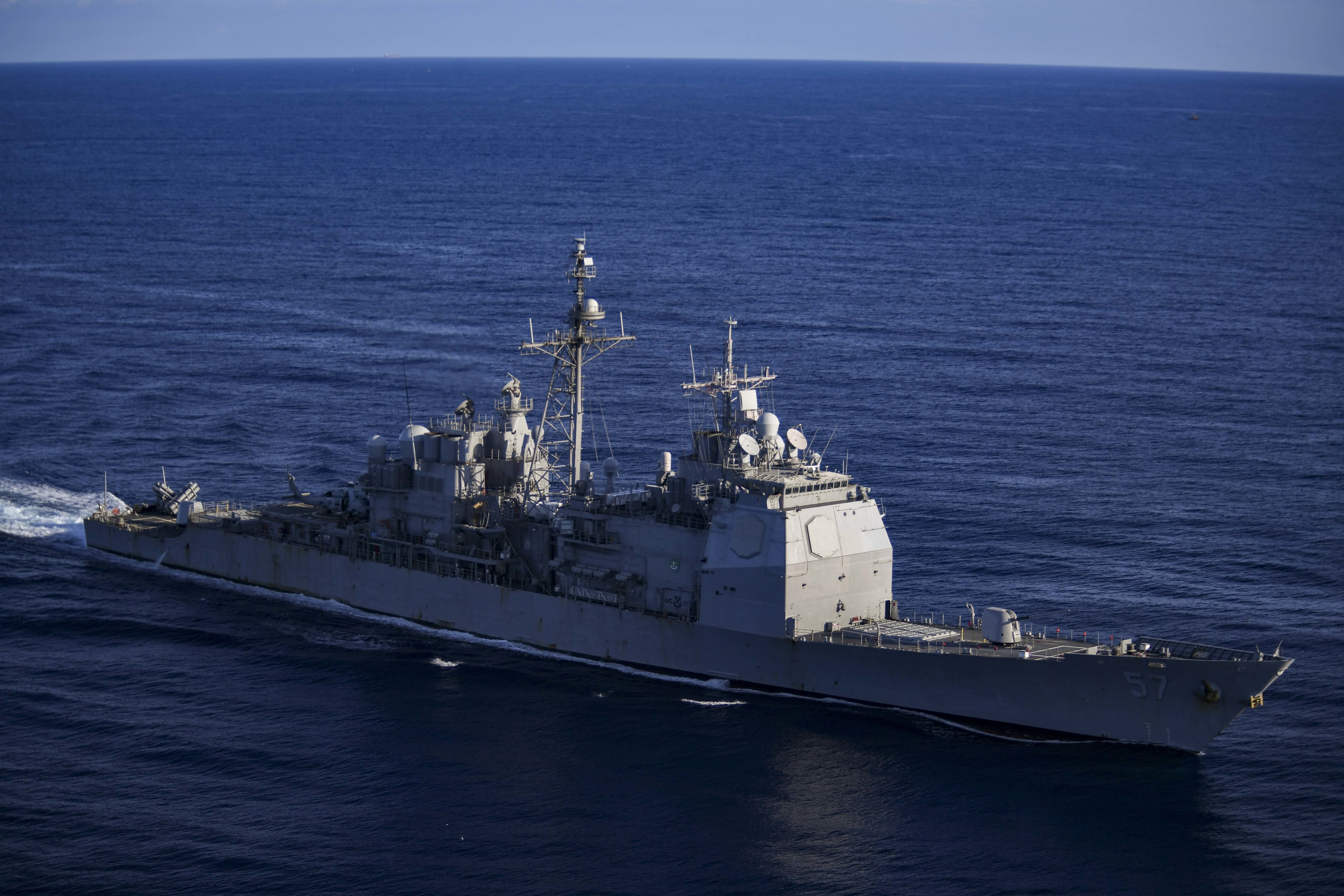
- USS Lake Champlain

History

United States
- Name: Lake Champlain
- Namesake: Battle of Lake Champlain
- Awarded: 16 December 1983
- Builder: Ingalls Shipbuilding
- Laid down: 3 March 1986
- Launched: 3 April 1987
- Acquired: 1 June 1988
- Commissioned: 12 August 1988
- Decommissioned: 1 September 2023
- Identification: Call sign: NCPN; Hull number: CG-57
- Motto: Ingenuity Daring Discipline
- Status: Out of service
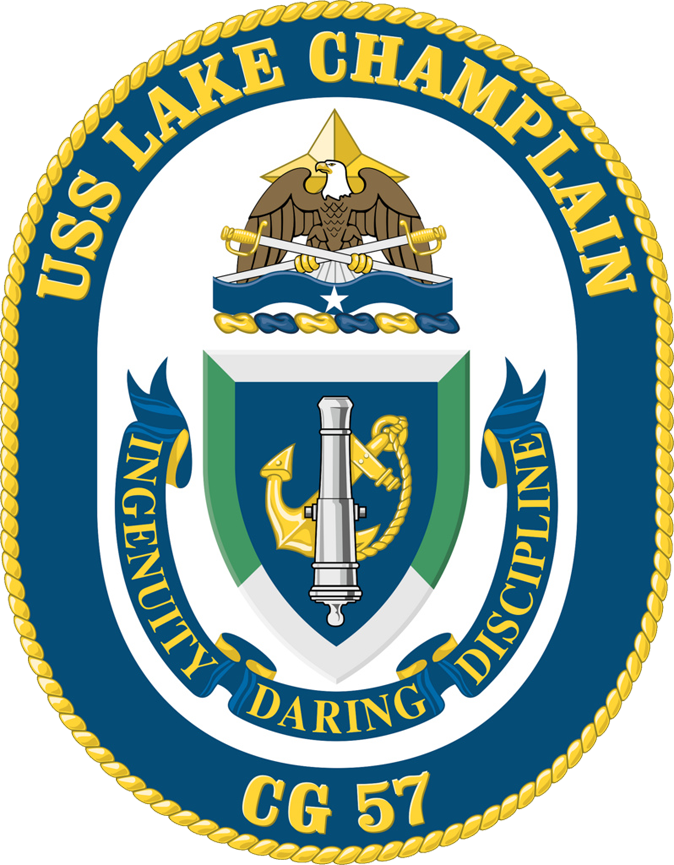
- Badge

General characteristics
- Class & type: Ticonderoga-class cruiser
- Displacement: Approx. 9,600 long tons (9,800 t) full load
- Length: 567 feet (173 m)
- Beam: 55 feet (16.8 meters)
- Draft: 34 feet (10.2 meters)
- Propulsion: 4 × General Electric LM2500 gas turbine engines; 2 × controllable-reversible pitch propellers; 2 × rudders
- Speed: 32.5 knots (60 km/h; 37.4 mph)
- Complement: 30 officers and 300 enlisted
- Sensors & processing systems: AN/SPY-1A/B multi-function radar; AN/SPS-49 air search radar (Removed on some ships); AN/SPG-62 fire control radar; AN/SPS-73 surface search radar; AN/SPQ-9 gun fire control radar; AN/SQQ-89(V)1/3 - A(V)15 Sonar suite, consisting of: AN/SQS-53B/C/D active sonar; AN/SQR-19 TACTAS, AN/SQR-19B ITASS, & MFTA passive sonar; AN/SQQ-28 light airborne multi-purpose system
- Armament: 2 × 61 cell Mk 41 vertical launch systems containing; 122 × mix of: RIM-66M-5 Standard SM-2MR Block IIIB; RIM-156A SM-2ER Block IV; RIM-161 SM-3; RIM-162A ESSM; RIM-174A Standard ERAM; BGM-109 Tomahawk; RUM-139A VL-ASROC; 8 × RGM-84 Harpoon missiles; 2 × 5 in (127 mm)/62 caliber Mark 45 Mod 4 lightweight gun; 2 × Mk 38 25 mm Machine Gun Systems; 2–4 × .50 in (12.7 mm) cal. machine gun; 2 × Phalanx CIWS Block 1B; 2 × Mk 32 12.75 in (324 mm) triple torpedo tubes
- Aircraft carried: 2 × MH-60R Seahawk LAMPS Mk III helicopters.

USS Lake Champlain (CG-57) is a decommissioned Ticonderoga-class guided missile cruiser in the United States Navy. She is the third US Naval ship to be named Lake Champlain, in honor of Battle of Lake Champlain, which took place during the War of 1812.

Lake Champlain was laid down 3 March 1986, at Ingalls Shipbuilding in Pascagoula, Mississippi, launched 3 April 1987, and commissioned 12 August 1988, at Intrepid Pier at the Intrepid Sea-Air-Space Museum in New York City. She then steamed to her homeport of San Diego, via Cape Horn, South America, losing part of her hurricane bulwark in heavy seas.

== Ship history ==
=== Deployments ===
She has been to the Persian Gulf on multiple occasions, first as a part of Operation Desert Shield, then later following Desert Storm.

On 25 January 1990 in the northern Philippine Sea, Lake Champlain rescued 14 sailors from MV Huazhu and transported the survivors to Subic Bay. She aided in the evacuation of the Philippines during the 1991 Mount Pinatubo eruption while transiting to the Persian Gulf.

Lake Champlain was assigned to Carrier Group One. The ship completed 17 major deployments.

=== 2007 explosion ===
On 10 November 2007 an explosion occurred in the ship's hull during routine maintenance in a San Diego dry dock. Six workers were injured, one of them critically. The explosion was caused when flammable gases ignited inside the fuel-tank compartment where the workers were working. The U.S. Occupational Safety and Health Administration (OSHA) investigated the incident. OSHA cited NASSCO, a Navy contractor in charge of the work, for seven serious safety violations and two minor safety violations at the site. The explosion occurred one day after NASSCO subcontractor Técnico Corporation fired a safety inspector who was responsible for measuring oxygen levels in enclosed worksites. The inspector subsequently filed a lawsuit against his former employer, alleging that he was a whistleblower who was fired after warning superiors that additional safety measures were needed on the ship.

=== 2017 collision ===
On 9 May 2017, a South Korean fishing vessel, approximately 60 to 70 feet (18 to 21 m) in length, collided with the port side of Lake Champlain while the ship was underway and conducting routine operations in international waters off Asia. No injuries were reported. Lake Champlain had attempted to contact the fishing vessel, but it didn't have a radio. The fishing vessel did not respond to Lake Champlain's emergency whistle. Both the cruiser and the fishing vessel were undamaged enough to be able to sail away under their own power.

=== 2023 end of service ===
Lake Champlain was decommissioned during a ceremony at San Diego Naval Base on 1 September 2023. She remains with the Navy as they plan to use her as a Logistics Support Asset.

== Awards ==
- Battle Effectiveness (Battle E) Awards - 11 awards
- Navy Unit Commendation - 3 awards
- Meritorious Unit Commendation - 2 awards
- Vice Admiral Thomas H. Copeman III Material Readiness Award – (2018)
