= The Wire (JTF-GTMO) =

Weekly publication published by Joint Task Force Guantanamo

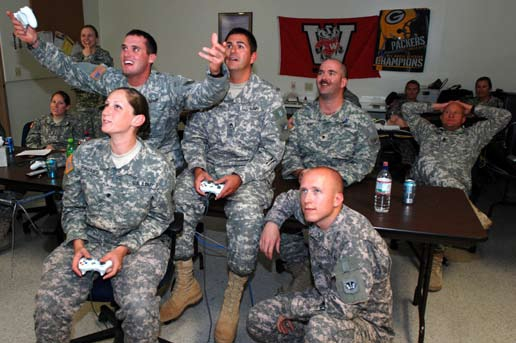
Staff at the JTF-GTMO Public Affairs Office that publishes The Wire -- in a Pros vs. GI Joes match.

The Wire is a weekly publication published by Joint Task Force Guantanamo, in Cuba.

On 23 April 2007 twelve troopers from the 241st Mobile Public Affairs Detachment arrived in Guantanamo to take over Public Affairs at Guantanamo, including the publication of The Wire.

The publication and excerpts from it have been included in a fictionalized account of military life at Guantanamo.
