= Michael E. Dunlavey =

- Born: 12 December 1945 (age 80); Buffalo, New York, United States
- Occupations: General officer, Judge
- Known for: A camp commandant at Guantanamo

Michael E. Dunlavey (born 12 December 1945) is a former major general in the United States Army. Following his retirement from the Army he was elected a State Judge in Erie Pennsylvania.

Dunlavey is on record as requesting authorization for interrogators to use controversial interrogation techniques derived from reverse-engineering the SERE training special forces soldiers go through so they can withstand torture, when he was the camp commandant of the Guantanamo Bay detention camps, in Cuba.

Dunlavey's speciality in the military was military intelligence, and it was in that capacity that he was appointed the commander of Joint Task Force 170, a position he held from February through November 2002. Dunlavey was the sole commander of JTF 170, a unit created to interrogate individuals held in Guantanamo Bay detention camp, in Cuba. Generals Lehnert and Baccus commanded Joint Task Force 160, a unit created to handle the detention of individuals held in Guantanamo. Dunlavey clashed with his Lehnert and Baccus, claiming they were undermining the efforts of his command through treating them humanely, allowing them to be visited by representatives of the Red Cross, and allowing them to be advised of their rights under the Geneva Conventions. He also clashed with the FBI, when its agents reported JTF 170 was using illegal interrogation techniques. In October 2002 Dunlavey wrote a memo to his superiors, requesting formal authorization to use extended interrogation techniques, that included sleep deprivation, beatings, sensory deprivation and overload. In November 2002 Secretary of Defense Donald Rumsfeld created Joint Task Force Guantanamo with the combined responsibilities of both Task Force 160 and Task Force 170, and appointed Geoffrey D. Miller to its command.

According to a 11 September 2011, profile in the Erie Times-News, a local paper, Dunlavey has defended the use of these controversial interrogation techniques.

Dunlavey no longer discusses his involvement. In a previous interview with the Erie-Times News, he said that detainees at Guantanamo were "not prisoners of war the way we were trained for, or the (kind the) Geneva Convention envisions." However, he has said he believes the tactics developed for their interrogations were "consistent with the Geneva Convention."

In 2004 four United Kingdom citizens sued Dunlavey for his role in their detention. In 2007 Freedom of Information Act requests revealed that Dunlavey told military investigators investigating the use of torture at Guantanamo that his orders came directly from Secretary of Defense Rumseld.

In 2011 Dunlavey sent out an email joke, for which he felt he should apologize the next day.

Dunlavey announced his intention to retire in May 2012, due to health problems. Dunlavey had been undergoing treatment for after-effects of his service during the 1991 Gulf War since 2002, and had been diagnosed with cancer in the fall of 2011.

According to the Erie Times News Dunlavey had been an early advocate of establishing veterans courts. The article compared special veteran's courts to mental health courts.
