= Donnie Thomas (US Army) =

American commander

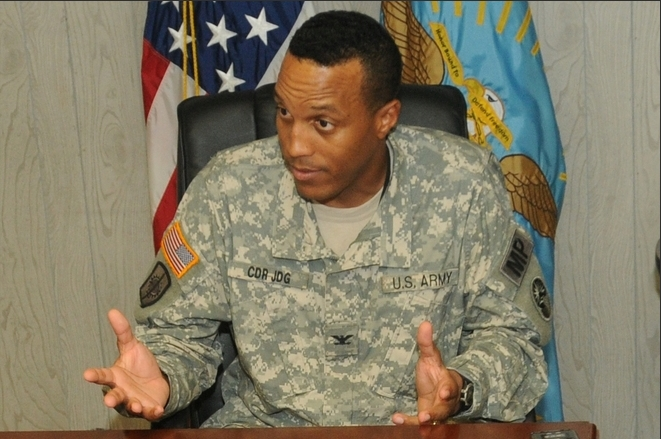
- Occupation: Military Police Officer
- Known for: Acknowledged he was aware Guantanamo meeting rooms were equipped to monitor detainees and their lawyers

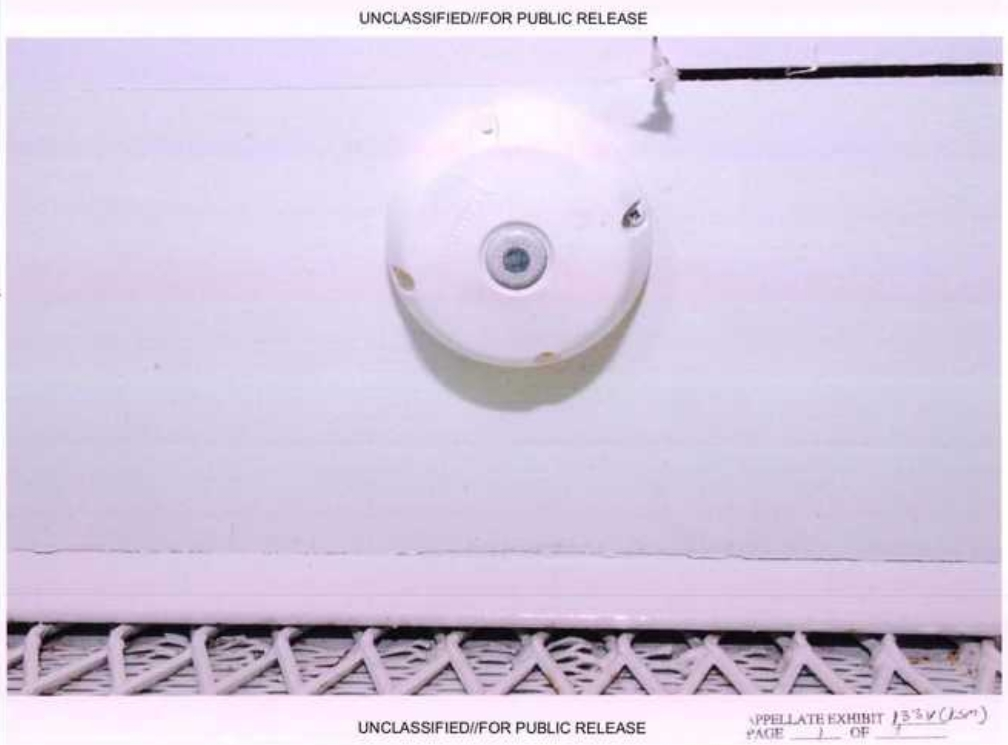
Thomas acknowledged he had known that devices made to look like smoke detectors were actually listening devices, installed so intelligence analysts could eavesdrop on Guantanamo detainees and their lawyers.

Colonel Donnie Thomas was the commander of Joint Task Force Guantanamo's Joint Detention Group from February 2010 to June 2012.

In December 2011 the public learned about Camp Five Echo, a previously secret camp, for non-compliant detainees were kept in isolation. According to Thomas the conditions at the camp met the minimum standards, so they weren't inhumane.

In June 2012 Michael Isikoff, of NBC News, interviewed Thomas about recently announced improvements to the detainees' conditions of detention.

In March 2013 it became known that the interview rooms where attorneys met with Guantanamo clients were fitted with listening devices. Thomas's successor, John Bogdan, testified that he was not aware the rooms were bugged, while Thomas testified he was aware. Colonel Thomas Welsh, Joint Task Force Guantanamo's Legal Advisor, described asking Thomas for an explanation when he observed a law enforcement agent monitoring a meeting between other law enforcement officials, prosecutors, defense attorneys and a detainee-client at Camp Echo II.
