= Thomas H. Copeman III =

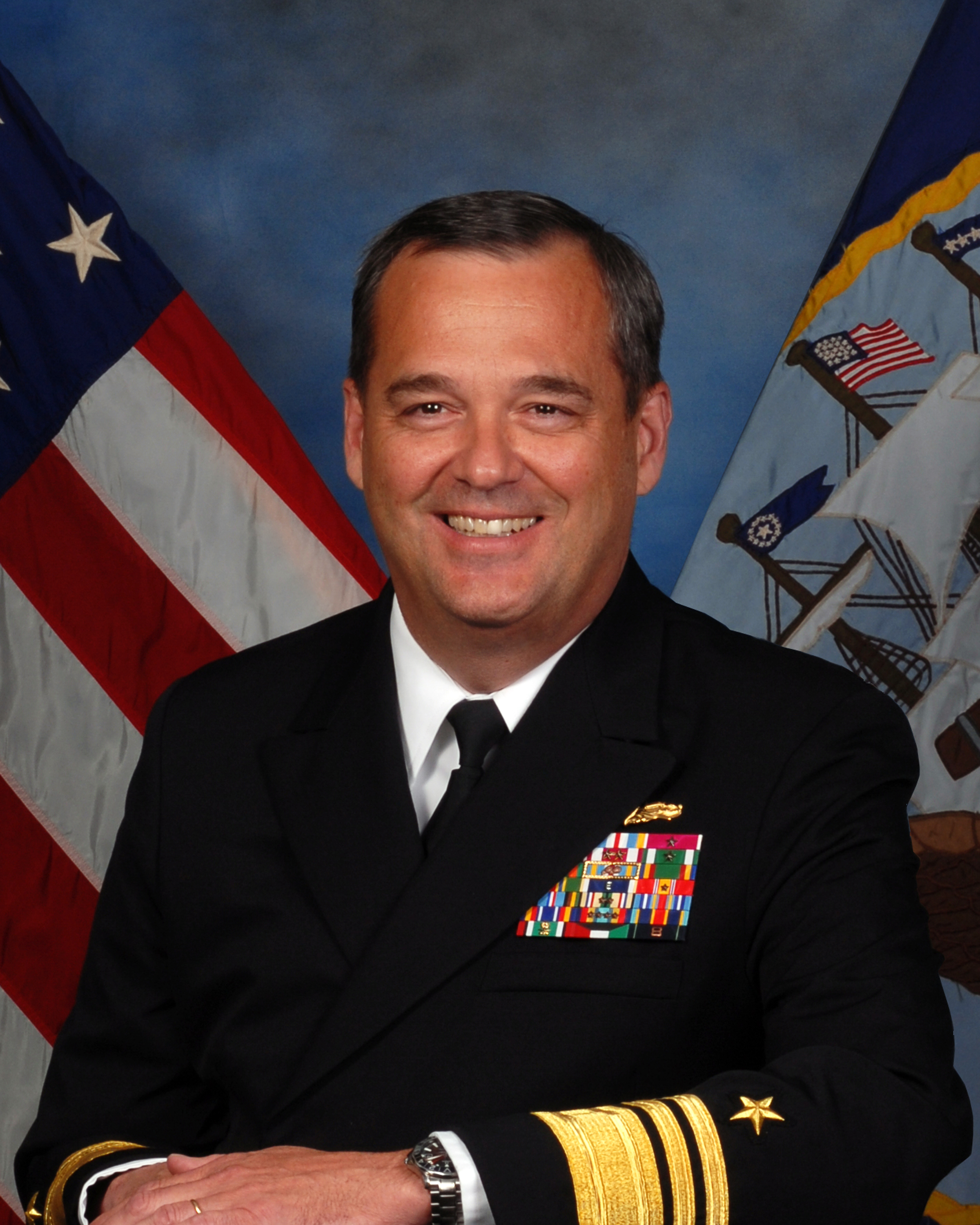
Official service photograph

Thomas Henry Copeman III (born 1959) is a retired officer of the United States Navy. In mid-2009 he was appointed commandant of the Guantanamo Bay detention camps, in Cuba. His final assignment was as Commander, Naval Surface Forces Pacific from July 2012 to August 2014.

== Early life and education ==
Copeman graduated from high school in Honolulu, Hawaii, after which he attended Creighton University, Omaha, Nebraska, where he received a Bachelor of Science degree in biology in 1981. He was commissioned 2 April 1982, at the Officer Candidate School in Newport, Rhode Island. Copeman is a graduate of the U.S. Army Command and General Staff College, Fort Leavenworth, Kansas. He holds a Master of Science in Administration degree from Central Michigan University and also completed the Massachusetts Institute of Technology Seminar XXI program on National Security Affairs.

== Military career ==
Copeman served in cruisers and destroyers in both the Atlantic and Pacific Fleets. His first assignment was as Electrical officer and Main Propulsion assistant in USS Leftwich. His second division officer tour was as a gas turbine inspector for Pacific Fleet Propulsion Examining Board. Following graduation from Surface Warfare Officers School Department Head Course in 1987, he reported as the commissioning engineer officer in USS Philippine Sea and participated in combat operations in the Persian Gulf War while assigned in her. Subsequent sea tours include executive officer in USS Lake Champlain and as commanding officer USS Benfold. Following a tour as fleet operations officer in 2nd Fleet, Copeman commanded Destroyer Squadron 28, where he deployed, as the Sea Combat commander, in the George Washington Carrier Strike Group to the Persian Gulf in support of Operation Iraqi Freedom and Operation Enduring Freedom.

While ashore, Copeman served in the U.S. Strategic Command, Omaha, Nebraska, as an action officer in the Current Operations Directorate (J31). His next shore tour was as a BMC4I requirements officer in the Theater Air Warfare Branch in the Surface Warfare Directorate (N76), Office of the Chief of Naval Operations. He served as executive assistant to the deputy commander and chief of staff, U.S. Atlantic Fleet, the director of Navy Senate Liaison in the Office of Legislative Affairs and the chief of staff for Naval Surface Forces, San Diego, California. He served as deputy chief of staff for operations and training for the U.S. Pacific Fleet. He then served as commander, Joint Task Force, Guantanamo Bay, Cuba, followed by a period as chief of legislative affairs. He retired from the Navy on 1 October 2014.

== Awards and honors ==
Copeman has been awarded the Defense Superior Service Medal, Legion of Merit (6 awards), Defense Meritorious Service Medal, Meritorious Service Medal (3 awards), Navy Commendation Medal (2 awards), Navy Achievement Medal as well as various unit and campaign awards.
