= Hongmin =

- Pronunciation: /xʊŋ.min/ (various tones)
- Gender: Either
- Language: Mandarin Chinese

Origin
- Meaning: Differs depending on Chinese characters used to write it

Other names
- Alternative spelling: Hung-min

Hongmin is the pinyin spelling of various Chinese given names, also spelled Hung-min in the Wade–Giles romanisation common in Taiwan. These names are written with various Chinese characters, and may have differences in tone, so neither their pronunciation nor their meaning is identical.

People with these names include:

- Wei Hongmin (韋弘敏, fl. 683–684), chancellor of the Chinese Tang Dynasty
- Zhang Hongmin (张宏民, born 1961), Chinese television news reporter
- Bian Hongmin (边洪敏, born 1989), Chinese volleyball player
