= Scott Stearney =

United States Navy vice admiral (1960–2018)

Scott A. Stearney
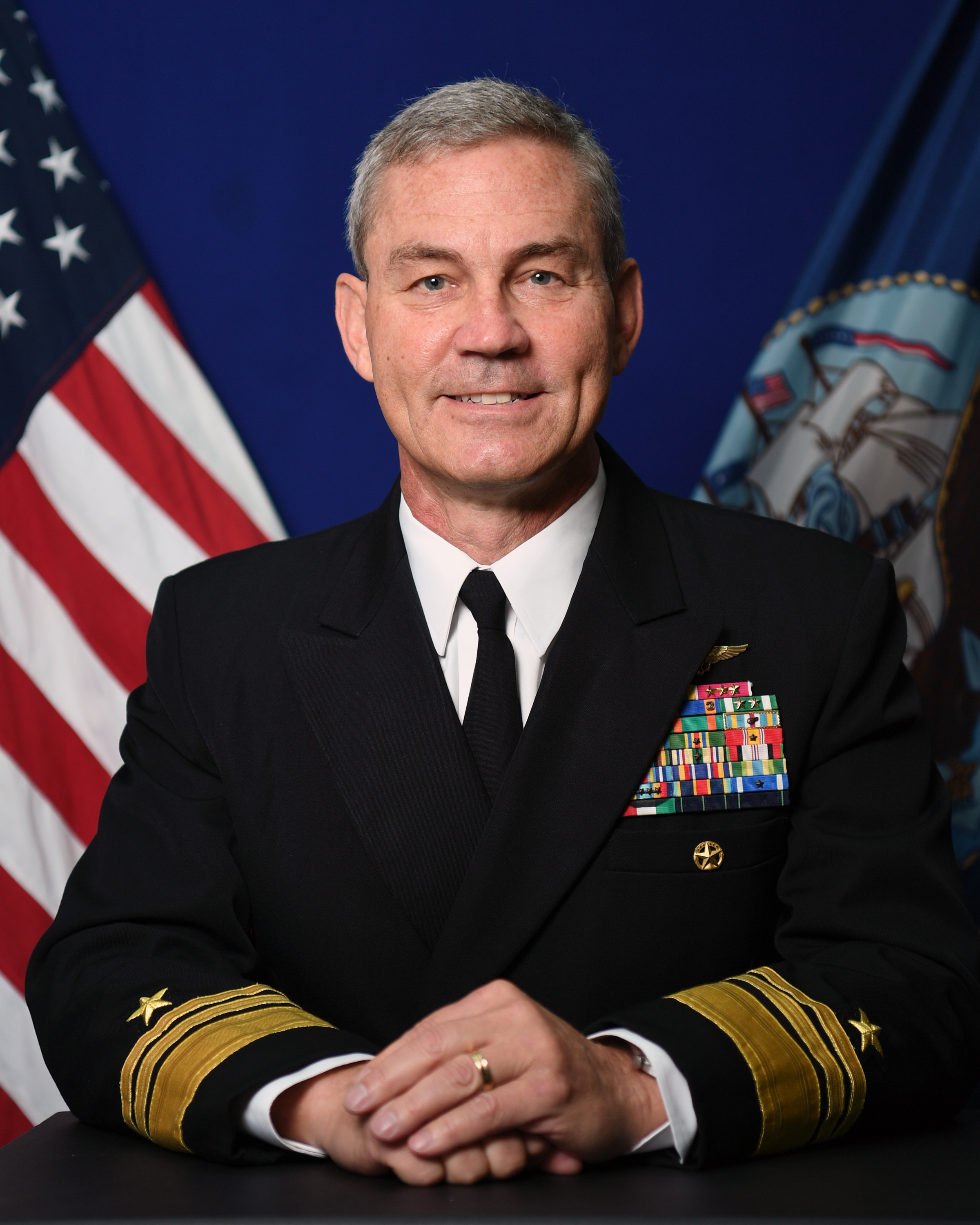
- Stearney in 2018
- Born: October 21, 1960; Chicago, Illinois, U.S.
- Died: December 1, 2018 (aged 58); Naval Support Activity Bahrain
- Burial place: Arlington National Cemetery
- Military career
- Allegiance: United States
- Branch: United States Navy
- Service years: 1982–2018
- Rank: Vice Admiral
- Commands: United States Naval Forces Central Command; United States Fifth Fleet; Navy Warfare Development Command; Commander Strike Force Training Atlantic; Joint Enabling Capabilities Command; Carrier Air Wing Seven; VFA-131
- Conflicts: Gulf War; War in Afghanistan
- Awards: Defense Superior Service Medal (2); Legion of Merit (4)

Scott Andrew Stearney (October 21, 1960 – December 1, 2018) was an American naval aviator and vice admiral of the United States Navy who served as commander of the Fifth Fleet based in Bahrain.

== Early life and education ==
Stearney was a native of Chicago, Illinois. He graduated from the University of Notre Dame, earning a Bachelor of Arts in Economics prior to commissioning in the United States Navy in October 1982. He subsequently entered flight training and was designated a Naval Aviator in April 1984. He graduated from Navy Fighter Weapons School and held a Master of Science in National Resource Strategy from the National Defense University.

== Naval career ==
Stearney served in numerous strike fighter squadrons flying the FA-18 Hornet. His fleet assignments included the Golden Warriors of Strike Fighter Squadron VFA-87, the Knighthawks of Strike Fighter Squadron VFA-136 and strike warfare officer for commander, Carrier Group 4 (CCG-4). He commanded the Wildcats of VFA-131 and Carrier Air Wing Seven (CVW-7) embarked on USS Dwight D. Eisenhower (CVN-69). He served in Kabul, Afghanistan, as chief of staff of Joint Task Force 435 (JTF 435) and later Combined Joint Interagency Task Force 435 (CJIATF 435).

Ashore, Stearney served as instructor and readiness officer at Navy Fighter Weapons School, aide-de-camp to the Chief of Naval Operations, deputy director J6 United States Joint Forces Command, executive assistant to deputy commander, United States Joint Forces Command and chief of staff, Strike Force Training Atlantic.

Stearney's flag assignments included: commander, United States Transportation Command's Joint Enabling Capabilities Command; commander, Strike Force Training Atlantic; commander, Carrier Strike Group 4 (CCSG-4); commander, Navy Warfare Development Command; and director of operations, United States Central Command.

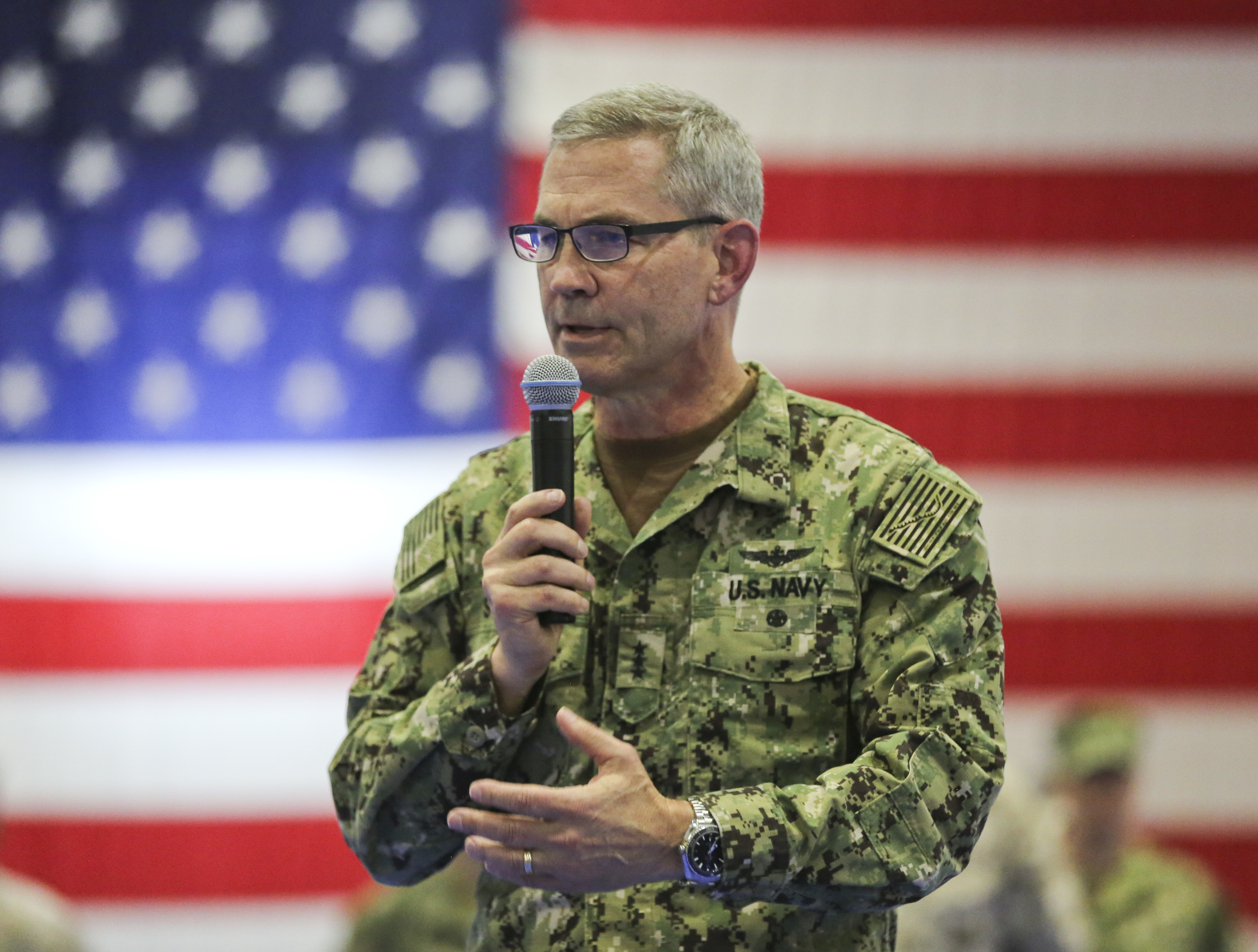
Stearney in June 2018

Stearney served as commander, United States Naval Forces Central Command, United States Fifth Fleet, and Combined Maritime Forces from May 2018 until his death on December 1, 2018.

Stearney's military decorations included the Defense Superior Service Medal with Oak Leaf Cluster, the Legion of Merit with three Gold Stars, the Air Medal with strike/flight numeral 3, the Navy and Marine Corps Commendation Medal with two Gold Stars, the Navy and Marine Corps Achievement Medal, as well as other commendations and multiple service medals. He accumulated more than 4,500 mishap-free flight hours and over 1,000 carrier arrested landings.

== Death ==
Stearney was found dead in his home in Bahrain on December 1, 2018, in an apparent suicide. Rear Admiral Paul J. Schlise, the deputy commander, assumed command of the Fifth Fleet in his stead. His death was investigated by the Naval Criminal Investigative Service (NCIS) and the Ministry of the Interior of Bahrain. NCIS concluded his death was the result of suicide. Stearney was interred at Arlington National Cemetery on December 20, 2018.

Military offices
Preceded by Craig S. Faller	Director of Operations of United States Central Command; 2016–2018	Succeeded by Samuel Paparo
Preceded by John C. Aquilino	Commander of the United States Naval Forces Central Command and United States Fifth Fleet; 2018	Succeeded by Paul J. Schlise; Acting
