= Samuel Paparo =

American admiral (b. 1964)

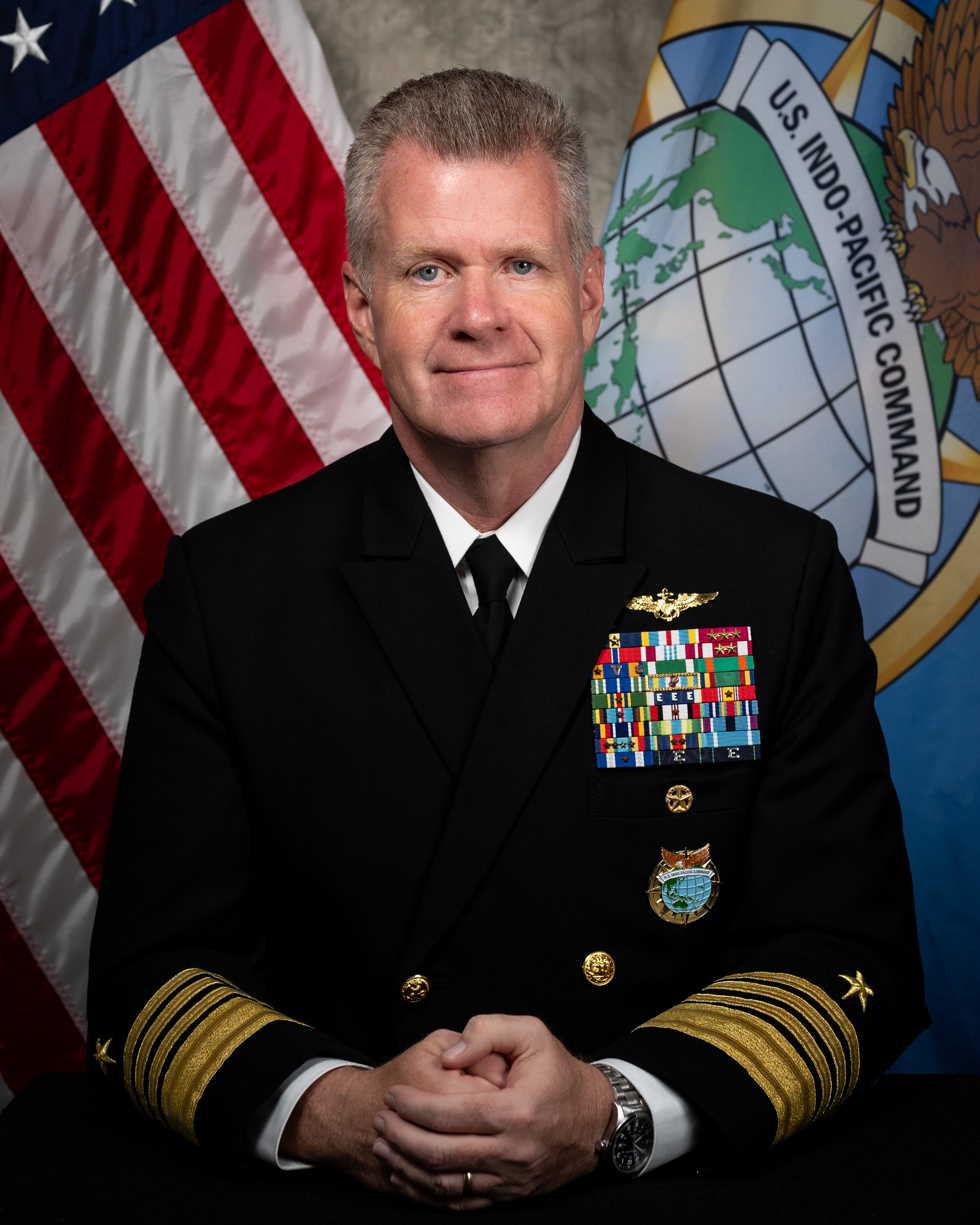
- Born: Samuel John Paparo Jr. 1964 (age 61–62); Morton, Pennsylvania, U.S.
- Education: Villanova University (BA); Old Dominion University (MA); Naval Postgraduate School (MS)
- Military career
- Allegiance: United States
- Branch: United States Navy
- Service years: 1987–present
- Rank: Admiral
- Commands: United States Pacific Command; United States Pacific Fleet; United States Naval Forces Central Command; United States Fifth Fleet; Combined Maritime Forces; Carrier Strike Group 10; Carrier Air Wing 7; VFA-106; Provincial Reconstruction Team; VFA-195
- Conflicts: War in Afghanistan; 2001 invasion of Afghanistan; Iraq War; 2026 Iran war; Naval blockade of Iran
- Awards: Navy Distinguished Service Medal (2); Defense Superior Service Medal; Legion of Merit (4); Bronze Star

Samuel John Paparo Jr. (born 1964) is an American admiral who has served as the commander of the United States Pacific Command since 2024.

Paparo is a native of Pennsylvania. He received his commission at the Aviation Officer Candidate School of the United States Navy in 1987 and became a naval aviator in 1989. A graduate of the Navy Fighter Weapons School (TOPGUN), he has over 6,000 flight hours and conducted over 1,100 carrier landings. Paparo also earned master's degrees from Old Dominion University and the Naval Postgraduate School.

He flew combat missions during the United States invasion of Afghanistan in 2001, and later deployed on the ground to lead a provincial reconstruction team during the war in Afghanistan, from 2007 to 2008. He was also deployed for the Iraq War. Paparo's commands included two strike fighter squadrons, Carrier Air Wing 7 from 2011 to 2012, and Carrier Strike Group 8 from 2017 to 2018. He also served as the director of operations at the United States Central Command from 2018 to 2020.

Paparo served as the commander of U.S. Naval Forces Central Command, the U.S. Fifth Fleet, and the Combined Maritime Forces from 2020 to 2021, and then as the commander of the U.S. Pacific Fleet from 2021 to 2024. Since becoming commander of Indo-Pacific Command, he had a role in the peace negotiations during the 2025 Cambodian–Thai border crisis, and in enforcing the naval blockade of Iran during the 2026 Iran war.

== Early life and education ==
Samuel John Paparo Jr. was born in 1964, and grew up in Morton, Pennsylvania, a working-class borough in Delaware County outside Philadelphia. He is the son of a former enlisted Marine and the grandson of a World War II enlisted sailor. He attended Cardinal O'Hara High School in Springfield, Pennsylvania, and graduated from Villanova University in 1987 with a Bachelor of Arts in Political Science. He was commissioned in 1987 through the Aviation Officer Candidate School at Naval Air Station Pensacola, Florida.

Paparo subsequently earned a Master of Arts in International Studies from Old Dominion University and a Master of Science in Systems Analysis from the Naval Postgraduate School. He is a graduate of the Air Command and Staff College, Air War College, Naval War College, and the Joint and Combined Warfighting School at the Joint Forces Staff College.

== Early naval career ==
After receiving his commission in the United States Navy in 1987, Paparo earned his wings as a naval aviator in 1989 at Naval Air Station Kingsville, through the Navy's Strike pipeline. He was later designated a Strike Fighter Tactics Instructor (SFTI) as a graduate of the Navy Fighter Weapons School, known as TOPGUN. He has logged over 6,000 flight hours in the F-14 Tomcat, F-15 Eagle, and F/A-18 Hornet and Super Hornet, and has made more than 1,100 carrier landings.

His first fleet assignment was as an F-14 pilot in Fighter Squadron 14 (VF-14) at Naval Air Station Oceana, and aboard USS John F. Kennedy and USS Theodore Roosevelt, until 1995. That was followed by exchange duty with the United States Air Force, flying the F-15C Eagle with the 71st Fighter Squadron, which included deployments to Saudi Arabia and Iceland. After training on the F/A-18C from October 1998, Paparo served in Strike Fighter Squadron 15 (VFA-15) aboard USS Theodore Roosevelt and USS Enterprise. On the opening night of Operation Enduring Freedom in October 2001, Paparo flew combat missions over Afghanistan, destroying a surface-to-air missile site near Kandahar during the initial strikes of the war. His first staff assignment was under the Commander, Naval Air Forces, as an F/A-18 training, readiness, and requirements officer, which lasted from March 2002 until August 2004.

=== Squadron and air wing command ===
From 2004, Paparo was the executive officer of Strike Fighter Squadron 195 (VFA-195), the "Dambusters," stationed at Naval Air Facility Atsugi, Japan, as part of the Navy's only permanently forward-deployed carrier air wing. He was the squadron commander from August 2005 to December 2006. The Dambusters, named for their destruction of the Hwacheon Dam in the Korean War, deployed with the USS Kitty Hawk Carrier Strike Group, maintaining a rapid-response posture across the Western Pacific.

In a highly unusual assignment for a naval aviator, Paparo commanded the Provincial Reconstruction Team in Nuristan Province, Afghanistan, from January 2007 to April 2008, serving alongside the 3rd Brigade, 10th Mountain Division and the 173rd Airborne Brigade. Nuristan was among the most remote and contested regions of the Afghan theater, bordering Pakistan's tribal areas. Paparo led a joint force of over 100 soldiers, sailors, airmen, and civilians, overseeing counterinsurgency and development operations in terrain so austere that resupply was often possible only by helicopter. Under his command, the PRT supervised construction of the Titin Bridge linking Nuristan's western and central valleys, executed an unprecedented intra-theater relocation to establish the province's first permanent PRT presence, and developed a Small Rewards Program that resulted in the collection of heavy weapons, small arms, rocket-propelled grenades, and a shoulder-fired thermobaric weapon. Paparo's approach emphasized engagement with local tribal leaders and a patient counterinsurgency philosophy focused on winning the trust of the population.

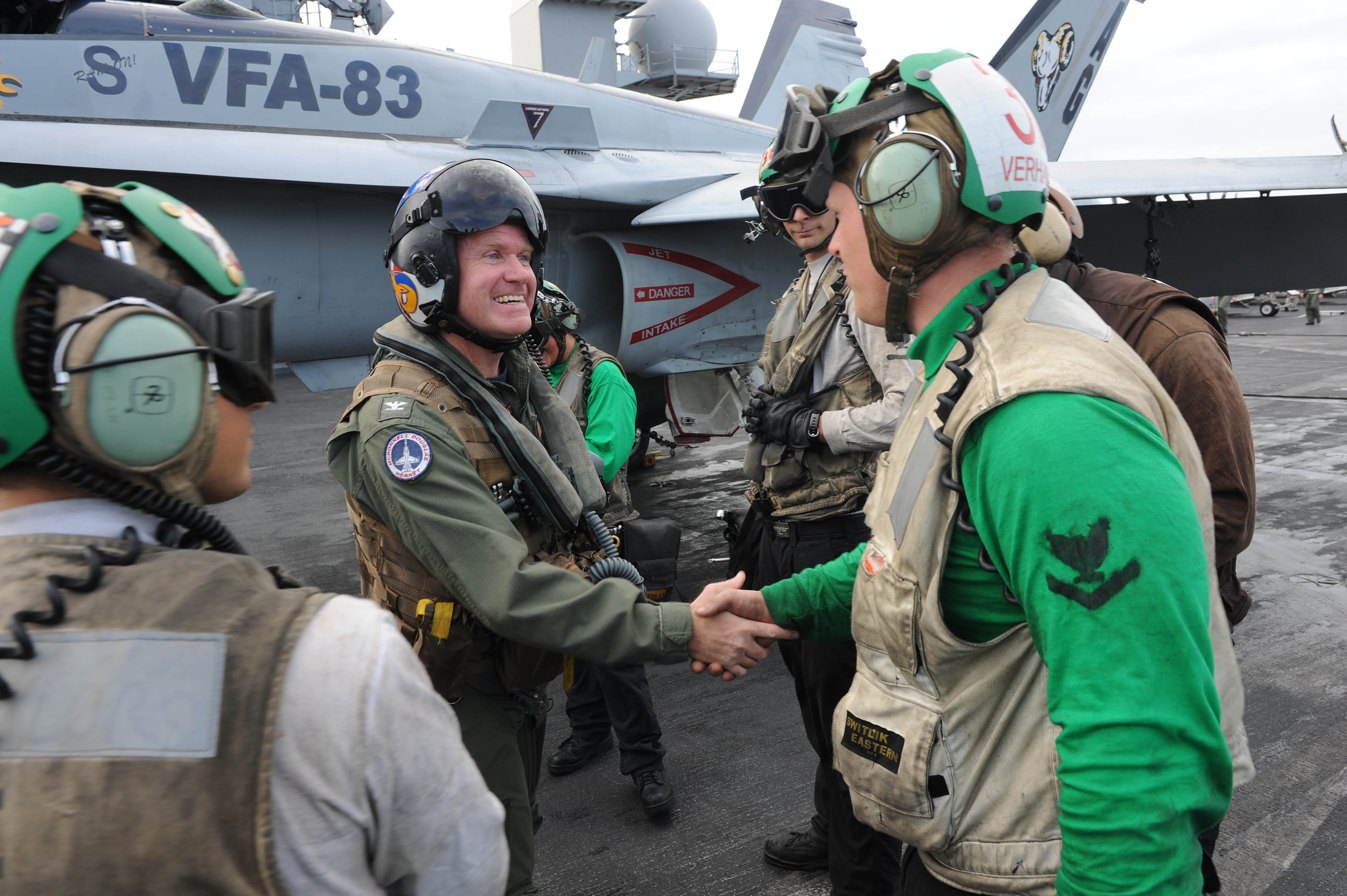
Paparo during the change of command of Carrier Air Wing 7, on 2 December 2012.

The assignment later drew attention in Jake Tapper's book The Outpost (2012), an account of Combat Outpost Keating in Nuristan, where Paparo is portrayed navigating the complex tribal dynamics of the province, mediating between warring local factions, and working to establish enough stability for civilian development organizations to operate. Tapper's account depicts Paparo as deeply committed to the counterinsurgency model, wary of heavy-handed actions that risked alienating the population the coalition was trying to protect. After his assignment in Afghanistan, Paparo commanded Strike Fighter Squadron 106 (VFA-106) from May 2008 to June 2009.

Paparo served as deputy commander of Carrier Air Wing 7 (CVW-7) from October 2009 to August 2011, embarked aboard USS Dwight D. Eisenhower. He was then the commander of the wing until December 2012. The air wing comprised eight squadrons with approximately 1,500 personnel, operating F/A-18C/E/F Hornets and Super Hornets, E-2C Hawkeye airborne command and control, EA-6B Prowler electronic warfare, and SH-60 Seahawk helicopters. Rear Admiral Michael Manazir, in remarks at the change of command, praised Paparo’s ability to "grab a hold of an entire ship and infuse his passion, not only into his aviators but his maintainers and leaders."

He later served as battle director at the Combined Air and Space Operations Center, Al Udeid Air Base, Qatar; branch head of program planning and development (N80) on the chief of naval operations staff; and executive assistant to the commander of United States Fleet Forces Command, and to the 31st chief of naval operations, Admiral John Richardson.

== Senior naval career ==
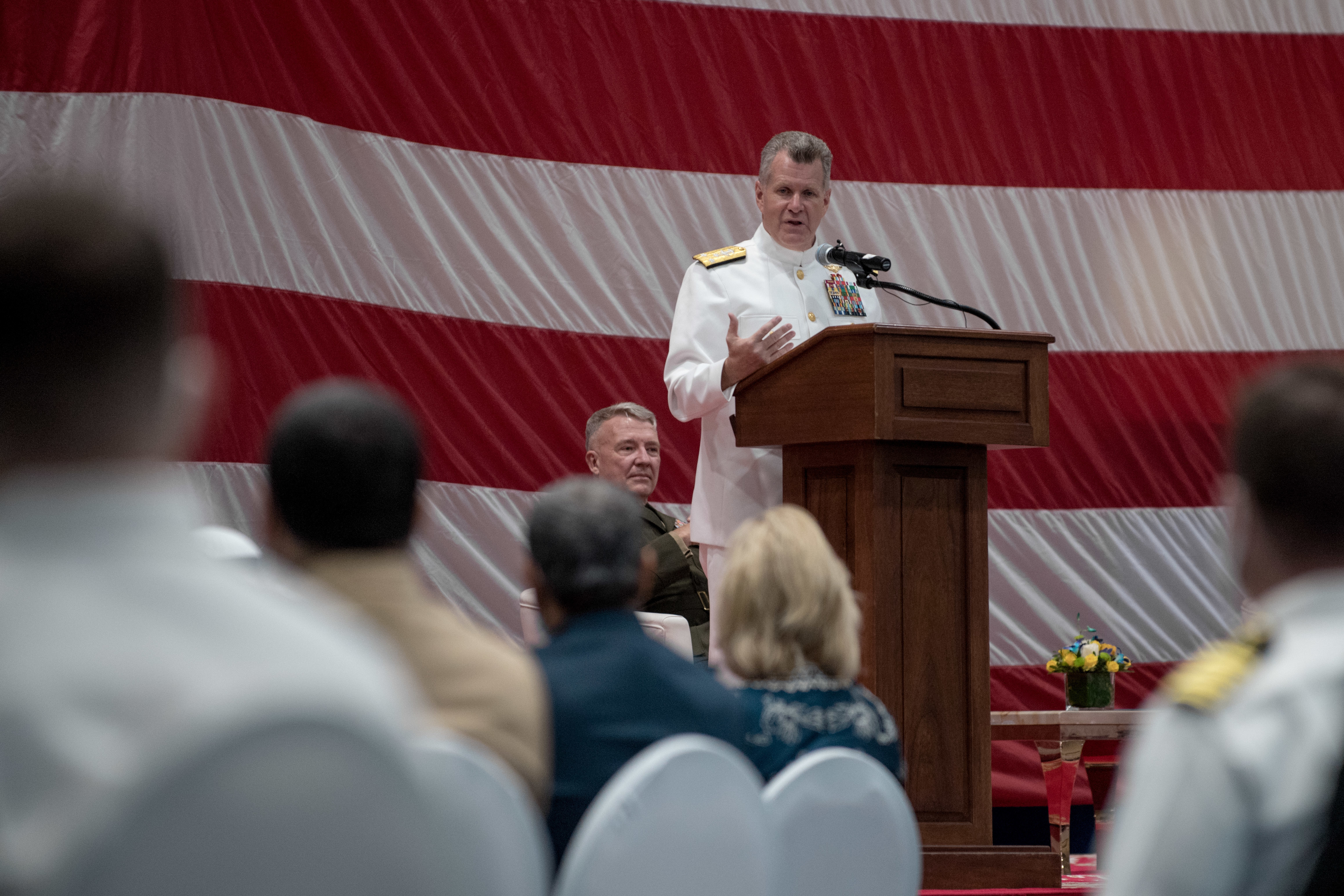
Paparo speaking at the Fifth Fleet change of command ceremony, on 4 May 2021.

From July 2017 to March 2018, as a rear admiral, Paparo commanded Carrier Strike Group 10, built around USS Dwight D. Eisenhower, Carrier Air Wing 3, guided-missile cruisers USS San Jacinto, USS Vella Gulf, and USS Monterey, and a destroyer squadron including USS Stout, USS Oscar Austin, and USS McFaul. In September 2017, following Hurricane Irma's devastation of the Florida Keys, Paparo directed the strike group's task force in Defense Support of Civil Authorities operations, clearing roads, restoring flight operations at Naval Air Station Key West, and coordinating restoration of critical utilities alongside the Florida National Guard and FEMA. Paparo then served as the Director of Operations (J3) at United States Central Command, MacDill Air Force Base, Florida, where he oversaw operational planning across the Middle East theater.

Promoted to vice admiral, Paparo commanded United States Naval Forces Central Command, the United States Fifth Fleet, and the Combined Maritime Forces from August 2020 to May 2021, headquartered in Bahrain. In this capacity, he directed all U.S. naval forces in the Middle East and coordinated a 33-nation international naval coalition responsible for maritime security operations supporting stability in the Persian Gulf, Gulf of Oman, Red Sea, and Indian Ocean, including operations in support of the conflicts in Iraq, Syria, and Afghanistan.

On 5 May 2021, Paparo assumed command of the United States Pacific Fleet, the world's largest fleet command. While commanding the Pacific Fleet, he developed concepts and experimentation efforts for the usage of naval forces to deter China, including with the use of sea and air drones. Paparo also oversaw the Navy's response to the Red Hill water crisis in Oahu, Hawaii, from late 2021, caused by a leak from a Navy fuel storage facility into the island's water supply.

In March 2023, Paparo gained widespread public recognition through a double-length segment on CBS's 60 Minutes, in which correspondent Norah O'Donnell interviewed him aboard the aircraft carrier USS Nimitz in the Western Pacific. In the interview, Paparo framed the strategic challenge posed by China’s rapid naval expansion, noting that the People's Republic of China Navy had grown from roughly 37 vessels in the early 2000s to 350. Asked whether the U.S. Navy was prepared to defend Taiwan, Paparo responded: "We're ready, yes. I'll never admit to being ready enough." The segment drew praise from the naval affairs community for presenting the service's posture with candor and nuance. Paparo's TOPGUN background drew additional media attention, with 60 Minutes noting he discussed the realism of flight sequences in the film Top Gun: Maverick with his children.

=== INDOPACOM/PACOM commander ===
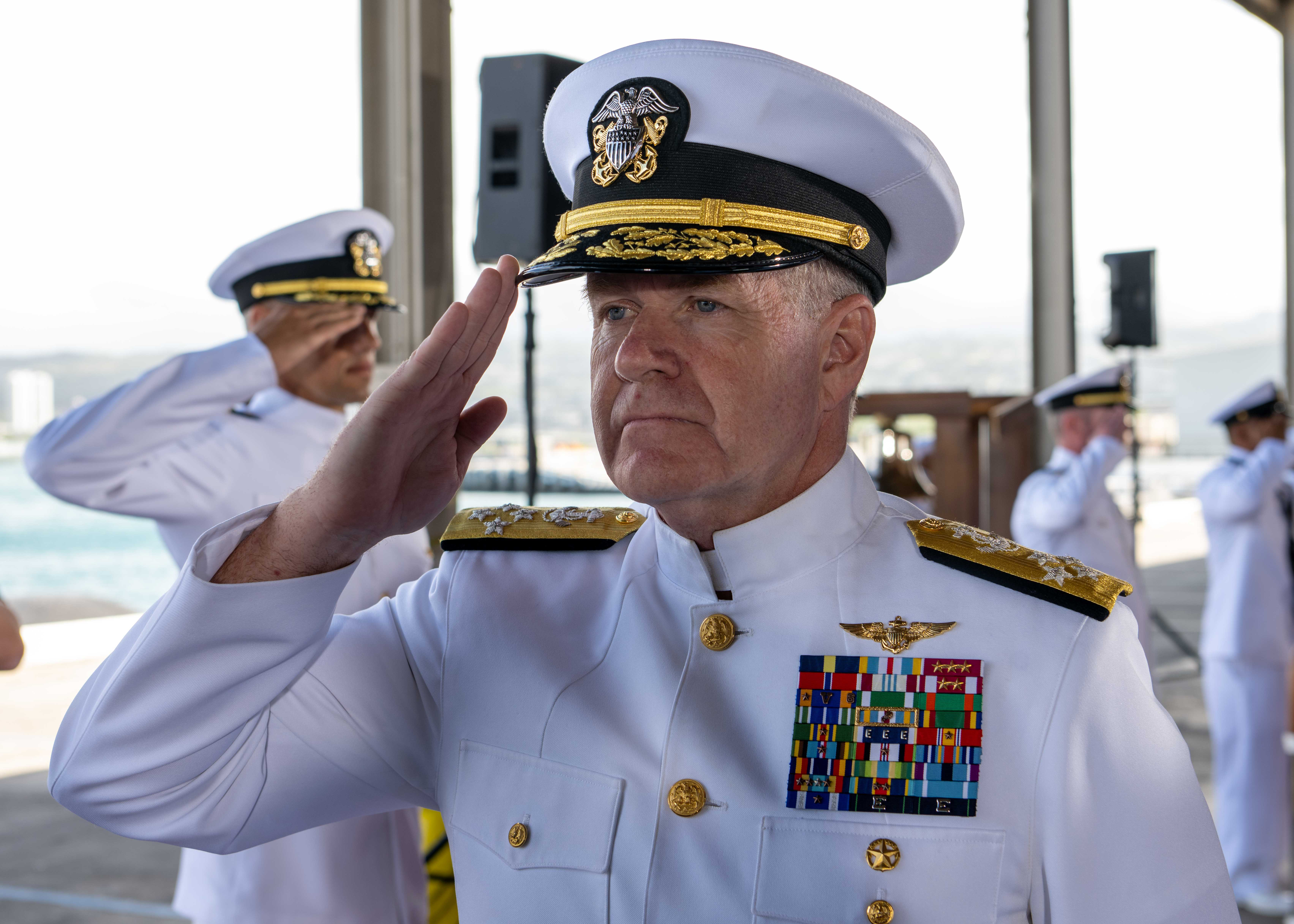
Paparo at the Pacific Fleet change of command ceremony, on 4 April 2024.

Nominated in July 2023 and confirmed by the Senate in February 2024, Paparo assumed command of United States Indo-Pacific Command on 3 May 2024, in a ceremony at Joint Base Pearl Harbor-Hickam attended by Secretary of Defense Lloyd Austin, Chairman of the Joint Chiefs of Staff General Charles Q. Brown Jr., and ambassadors from allied nations. He succeeded Admiral John C. Aquilino as the 27th commander of the combatant command.

In 2023, Paparo was among the candidates considered by President Joe Biden to serve as the chief of naval operations, though Admiral Lisa Franchetti was ultimately selected. Following Franchetti's removal by President Donald Trump in February 2025, Paparo was again reported as a leading contender for the post but reportedly declined consideration, choosing to remain focused on the Indo-Pacific Command. After the outbreak of the 2025 Cambodian–Thai border crisis in July, Paparo made several trips to Malaysia, where he encouraged the military chiefs of the two countries to end the conflict. His role in the peace efforts was critical before the arrival of Trump in October for the signing of a peace deal.

In January 2026 he attended a conference of the Pacific Forum to discuss a potential conflict with China with hundreds of military officers, business executives, and representatives of allies. During the naval blockade of Iran that began in April 2026, admist the war against Iran, the Indo-Pacific Command under Paparo was involved in maritime interdiction activities against ships assisting Iran that left the country before the blockade began.

On 16 June 2026 INDOPACOM was renamed back to United States Pacific Command. In the Secretary of Defense Orders Book of 14 August 2026, Paparo was among the three combatant commanders who disagreed with the support that they had to provide for the war against Iran, because it decreased their capabilities in their own region. In particular, PACOM provided its aircraft carrier strike group and destroyers.

== Awards and decorations ==
In May 2025, Paparo delivered the commencement address at Villanova University’s 182nd graduation ceremony and received an honorary Doctor of Military Science degree. His daughter Elizabeth, a member of the Class of 2025, introduced him at the ceremony. University President Rev. Peter Donohue described Paparo as "a man that believes in truth" who is "very committed to making world peace and keeping people safe." During his command of the Fifth Fleet, Paparo was awarded the Order of Khalifa by the King of Bahrain in recognition of his service strengthening the bilateral security relationship and his leadership of the 33-nation Combined Maritime Forces coalition.

Naval Aviator insignia
Command at Sea insignia

Navy Distinguished Service Medal with award star
Defense Superior Service Medal
Legion of Merit (29 March 2018), with three gold award stars
Bronze Star Medal
Defense Meritorious Service Medal
Meritorious Service Medal with two award stars
Air Medal with one bronze service star, Combat V and bronze Strike/Flight numeral "6"
Navy and Marine Corps Commendation Medal
Air Force Commendation Medal
Navy and Marine Corps Achievement Medal
Army Achievement Medal
Joint Meritorious Unit Award with oak leaf cluster
Navy Unit Commendation with service star
Navy Meritorious Unit Commendation with service star
Navy "E" Ribbon with three Battle E devices
Combat Readiness Medal
National Defense Service Medal with service star
Armed Forces Expeditionary Medal
Iraq Campaign Medal with service star
Global War on Terrorism Expeditionary Medal
Global War on Terrorism Service Medal
Armed Forces Service Medal
Humanitarian Service Medal
Military Outstanding Volunteer Service Medal
Navy Sea Service Deployment Ribbon with one silver and three bronze service stars
Navy and Marine Corps Overseas Service Ribbon with three service stars
The Khalifiyyeh Order of Bahrain, 2nd Class
NATO Medal for service with ISAF with service star
Honorary Officer of the Order of Australia (Military Division)
Navy Expert Rifleman Medal
Navy Expert Pistol Shot Medal

== Dates of promotion ==
Rank	Branch	Date
Ensign	Navy	1987
Lieutenant junior grade	Navy	
Lieutenant	Navy	6 February 1995
Lieutenant commander	Navy	8 November 1997
Commander	Navy	31 July 2002
Captain	Navy	27 June 2008
Rear admiral (lower half)	Navy	22 June 2017
Rear admiral	Navy	26 April 2018
Vice admiral	Navy	20 March 2020
Admiral	Navy	25 March 2021

== Personal life ==
Paparo is married to Maureen, also a graduate of Villanova University. They have six children. Paparo is Catholic and has been a member of the Knights of Columbus since 2005.

Military offices
Preceded by Roy Kelley	Commander of Carrier Air Wing 7; 2011–2012	Succeeded by Terry Morris
Preceded by James J. Malloy	Commander of Carrier Strike Group 10; 2017–2018	Succeeded by John F. Meier
Preceded by Scott Stearney	Director of Operations of United States Central Command; 2018–2020	Succeeded by Alexus Grynkewich
Preceded by James J. Malloy	Commander of the United States Naval Forces Central Command and United States Fifth Fleet; 2020–2021	Succeeded by Brad Cooper
Preceded by John C. Aquilino	Commander of the United States Pacific Fleet; 2021–2024	Succeeded by Stephen Koehler
Preceded by John C. Aquilino	Commander of the United States Indo-Pacific Command; 2024–present	Incumbent
U.S. order of precedence (ceremonial)
Preceded by Gregory Guillot as Commander of U.S. Northern Command	Order of precedence of the United States as Commander of U.S. Indo-Pacific Command	Succeeded by Randall Reed as Commander of U.S. Transportation Command
