= Joint Task Force Guantanamo =

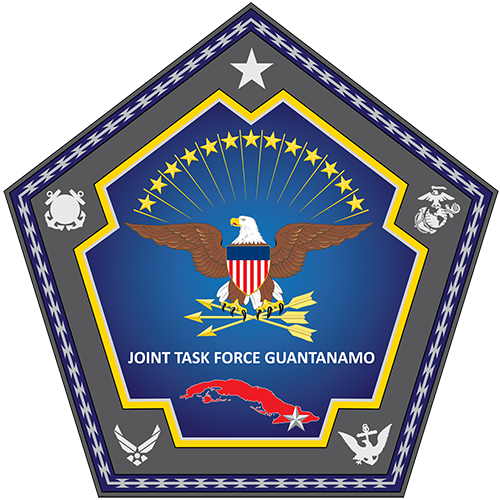
- Active: November 2002 – present
- Country: United States of America
- Branch: Joint
- Part of: United States Southern Command
- Garrison/HQ: Guantanamo Bay Naval Base
- Motto: Honor Bound to Defend Freedom
- Website: jtfgtmo.southcom.mil

Commanders
- Current commander: Colonel Steven Kane, USA

Joint Task Force Guantanamo (JTF-GTMO) is a U.S. military joint task force based at Guantanamo Bay Naval Base, Guantánamo Bay, Cuba, on the southeastern end of the base. JTF-GTMO falls under US Southern Command. Since January 2002 the command has operated the Guantanamo Bay detention camps Camp X-Ray and its successors Camp Delta, Camp V, and Camp Echo, where detained prisoners are held who have been captured in the war in Afghanistan and elsewhere since the September 11, 2001, attacks. From the command's founding in 2002 to early 2022, the detainee population has been reduced from 779 to 37. As of February 7, 2024, the unit is under the command of U.S. Army Col. Steven Kane.

== History ==
In 1992, the United States established Operation Sea Signal to prepare for a mass migration of refugees from Haiti and Cuba. In 1994, Operation Sea Signal led to the creation of Joint Task Force 160. JTF 160 was responsible for housing and processing more than 40,000 migrants awaiting repatriation or parole to the United States. Camp X-Ray was established to segregate migrants who had committed crimes, such as theft, assault and battery, prostitution and black-market activities, from other migrants and from U.S. civilians and military personnel at Guantanamo. In 1996, Operation Sea Signal came to an end and the military abandoned Camp X-Ray.

In December 2001, after the September 11 terrorist attacks and the United States intervention in Afghanistan, Joint Task Force 160 was reactivated. Camp X-Ray was prepared as a temporary location for the detention of people captured in Afghanistan who were believed to be part of the Taliban or al-Qaeda, neither of which the United States recognized as legal governments. In January 2002, the first detainees were transferred to Guantanamo Bay and housed in Camp X-Ray. The International Committee of the Red Cross (ICRC) had its first visit to the facility six days later. The ICRC has continued quarterly visits up to 2010.

== Detention facilities ==
In April 2002, construction of the new 410-bed Camp Delta (Camps 1, 2, 3) was completed. The detainees were moved from Camp X-Ray to Camp Delta that month. In November 2002, Joint Task Force 160 and 170 were merged to create Joint Task Force Guantanamo.

By 2007 original Camp Delta compound was supplemented by Camps 4, 5 and 6.

Camp 4, opened in February 2003, featured communal style living areas, similar to a military barracks, and was used to house "compliant" detainees.

Camp 5, opened in May 2004, had segregated housing units (i.e. solitary cells) for detainees who are uncompliant or who pose a threat to other detainees or Joint Task Force staff members. Camp 5 was closed in 2016 when the total detainee population was reduced to 61.

Camp 6, opened in November 2006, is patterned after a medium security prison with "pods" housing 10 to 20 detainees with individual cells but sharing a common living area. Camp 6 houses the "general population".

As of late 2016, almost all detainees were housed in Camp 6.

== Status of detainees ==
The status of these detainees is disputed. The United States government defines them as enemy combatants, claiming their status was not that of a prisoner of war as recognized under the Geneva Conventions (due to not being affiliated with any government, being alleged members of Al Qaida or groups affiliated with them).

In Rasul v Bush (2004), the Supreme Court held that the detainees had the right to counsel and to challenge their detentions at an impartial tribunal, according to habeas corpus. On 29 June 2006, the U.S. Supreme Court ruled in Hamdan v. Rumsfeld that they had the minimal protection of Article 3 of the Geneva Conventions in that detainees must be housed and treated humanely, and that they had the right to an impartial tribunal to hear charges against them. It said the military tribunals as established by the Dept. of Defense did not have sufficient authority, and Congress needed to authorize any system outside the established US civil and military justice systems. In Boumediene v. Bush (2008), the Supreme Court held that the detainees' right to habeas corpus could not be taken away by the Military Commission Act of 2006, which they ruled was unconstitutional. In addition, the Supreme Court held that detainees had the right to access federal courts to hear their habeas corpus challenges. Some of the cases are proceeding through the federal court system.

== Intelligence task forces ==
In February 2002, Joint Task Force 170 was created as the intelligence task force to work side by side with Joint Task Force 160. At a later date, JTF 170 was re-designated as the Joint Intelligence Group and was assigned as a subordinate element of Joint Task Force Guantanamo. The other subordinate elements of JTF GTMO are the Joint Detention Group and the Joint Medical Group.

== Joint Detention Group ==
The Joint Detention Group is one of the components of the Task Force. It is the organization assigned to guarding the captives, and maintaining camp security. The guards within the Joint Detention Group come from the United States Army and the United States Navy.

In 2009, guards outnumbered prisoners in Guantanamo by more than five to one. With the acceleration of detainee releases from 2009 to the early 2010s, this ratio increased greatly.

The officers commanding the Joint Detention Group, also known as the warden, have included:

- Colonel Adolph McQueen, 2002
- Colonel Bryce Gyrisko, 2004-2005
- Colonel Michael Bumgarner, 2005-2006
- Colonel Wade Dennis, 2006-2007
- Colonel Bruce Vargo, 2008–2010
- Colonel Donnie Thomas, 2010–2012
- Colonel John Bogdan, 2012–2014
- Colonel David Heath, 2014–2016
- Colonel Stephen Gabavics, 2016–2018
- Colonel Steven Yamashita 2018 – present

== Living quarters ==
Enlisted personnel live in pre-fabricated quarters, similar to shipping containers. Each prefab unit houses four to six personnel. Each prefab unit ships with a toilet and sink, but no internal partitions. Occupants are allowed to erect curtains to make temporary partitions, for privacy. Occupants share communal showers, shared between prefab quarters.

Officers and senior non-commissioned officers typically share cottages left over from family residences that were constructed when the base had a larger permanent population. Four occupants share a two-bedroom cottage.

According to Commander Daniel Jones, JTF-GTMO's Staff Judge Advocate:

The chow here is probably the best I've had and a mainstay of each day's activities. A "surf and turf" and special birthday meal are served at least once a month. By the end of your tour in GTMO you'll either weigh 300 pounds or be able to bench press 300 pounds. Nevertheless, you can look forward to a farewell BBQ and presentation of the highly coveted GTMO Bar Association Certificate.

== Commanding officers ==
The past commanders of JTF-GTMO:

- Colonel Steven Kane (USA), 2024 -
- Colonel Matthew Jemmott (USA) 2023 - 2024
- Brigadier General Scott Hiipakka (USA), 2022 - 2023
- Brigadier General Lance A. Okamura (USA), 2021 – 2022
- Rear Admiral Timothy C. Kuehhas (USN), 2019–2021
- Brigadier General John F. Hussey (USA), 2019
- Rear Admiral John C. Ring (USN), 2018–2019
- Rear Admiral Edward B. Cashman (USN), 2017–2018
- Rear Admiral Peter J. Clarke (USN), 2015–2017
- Brigadier General Jose Monteagudo (USAF), 2015
- Rear Admiral Kyle Cozad (USN), 2014–2015
- Rear Admiral Richard W. Butler (USN), 2013–2014
- Rear Admiral John W. Smith Jr (USN), 2012–2013
- Rear Admiral David B. Woods (USN), 2011–2012
- Rear Admiral Jeffrey Harbeson (USN), 2010–2011
- Rear Admiral Thomas H. Copeman III (USN), 2009–2010
- Rear Admiral David M. Thomas Jr. (USN), 2008–2009
- Rear Admiral Mark H. Buzby (USN), 2007–2008
- Rear Admiral Harry B. Harris Jr. (USN), 2006–2007
- Brigadier General Jay W. Hood (USA), 2004–2006
- Major General Geoffrey D. Miller (USA), 2002–2004
- Major General Michael Dunlavey (USA), 2002
- Brigadier General Rick Baccus (USA), 2002
- Brigadier General Michael Lehnert (USMC), 2002

== Task Force motto ==
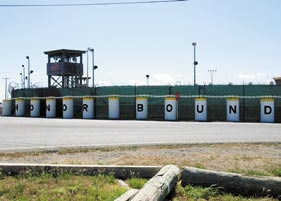
The wall has been painted with part of the motto "Honor Bound".

Joint Task Force Guantánamo's motto is "Honor Bound to Defend Freedom" and it was established during the command of Army Maj. Gen. Geoffrey Miller.

== Representation in culture ==
- Guantanamo: Honor Bound to Defend Freedom is the title of a 2004 book by Victoria Brittain (a former Guardian foreign editor) and novelist Gillian Slovo (ISBN 1-84002-474-7).
- Guantanamo: Honor Bound to Defend Freedom is the title of a 2004 play, based upon interviews with the families of men detained in Guantanamo Bay, by the same authors. It premiered at the Tricycle Theatre in London in 2004 and transferred to Off Broadway.
- Good Morning Gitmo is a one-act comedy written by Mishu Hilmy and Eric Simon in 2014. The play takes place decades into the future where the guards and staff have been forgotten at Camp Delta. It was originally produced by The Annoyance Theater in Chicago, Illinois.

== See also ==
- The Wire (JTF-GTMO)
- Unlawful combatant
