= Pressian =

South Korean online newspaper

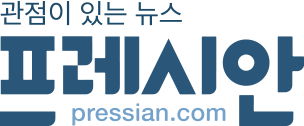
- Founded: September 24, 2001; 24 years ago
- Website: www.pressian.com

Pressian (Korean: 프레시안) is a South Korean online news publication. It was founded on September 24, 2001.

The news company was founded with the aim to create a public forum for discussion across the political spectrum.

== Description ==
The name of the company comes from a combination of the English word press with the acronym "Internet Alternative News".

In a 2004 survey by Sisa Journal, Pressian ranked among the top ten news sources in the country, among two other internet papers. Around this time, internet news began gaining significant traction in the country. By 2009, it was considered one of two leading online newspapers, with the other being OhmyNews.

The publication has been compared to OhmyNews, another alternate online news publication in South Korea. OhmyNews relies on a significant number of amateur non-career reporters. On the other hand, Pressian mainly publishes from and employs professional journalists. In 2013, a representative of Pressian conceded that OhmyNews had made a stronger connection with the South Korean public.

After experiencing financial and organizational difficulties for years, It underwent a significant corporate reorganization in 2013. It converted into a cooperative, in which people would purchase membership and participate in voting on company issues.

The company has a service that reviews books as well.
