= Destroyer Squadron 50 =

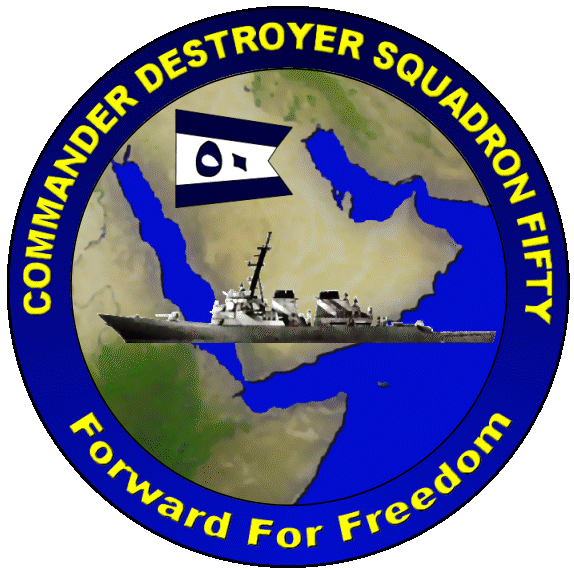
- Active: 1943–1945, 1994–present
- Country: United States
- Branch: United States Navy
- Type: Destroyer Squadron
- Part of: United States Fifth Fleet
- Garrison/HQ: Manama, Bahrain

Capt. Stephen Evans, the commander of Destroyer Squadron 50, arrives aboard the guided missile destroyer USS William P. Lawrence to oversee maritime security operations during International Mine Countermeasures Exercise (IMCMEX) 13 in Bahrain, on May 19, 2013.

Destroyer Squadron 50 (DESRON 50) is a destroyer squadron of the United States Navy. The squadron was first formed during World War II when the squadron commodore and his staff led ships in the Pacific Theater from October 1943 until its disestablishment in November 1945. The squadron was equipped with nine Fletcher-class destroyers, comprising Destroyer Divisions (DesDivs) 99 and 100.

For much of 1944, the squadron operated together with Admiral Marc Mitscher's Fast Carrier Task Force, screening the aircraft carrier USS Enterprise and a number of other carriers in Rear Admiral John W. Reeves' Task Group during the Marshall Islands and Marianas operations. It participated in the Battle of the Philippine Sea on 19–20 June 1944.

The squadron was re-established on 30 November 1994 during ceremonies aboard the aircraft carrier USS Dwight D. Eisenhower. Captain David M. Stone took command of the squadron, 49 years after it stood down in the Pacific. It appears to be based at Manama, Bahrain alongside the rest of the United States Fifth Fleet (FIFTHFLT) headquarters.

Commander Middle East Force (MEF) also served as Commander Destroyer Squadron 50 until MEF's formal disestablishment in 2012–2013. Cruisers, destroyers, and frigates deployed to the region, usually about five at a time, to form the Middle East Force. They perform Maritime Interception Operations (MIO), participate in regional exercises, and serve during contingencies. They deploy as either the LANTMEF (Atlantic Marine Expeditionary Force) or PACMEF (Pacific MEF). While in the region, they are coordinated in Fifth Fleet by Commander, Destroyer Squadron 50.

USS David R. Ray deployed to the Persian Gulf in October 1994 and served as flagship to Commander, Destroyer Squadron 50 conducted Maritime Interception Operations in boarding numerous suspect vessels resulting in the diversion and detention of three vessels. Under Operational Command of Commander Fifth Fleet, COMDESRON 50 was the Multi-National Interdiction Operations (MIO) Commander for an area in the Persian Gulf, referred to as the NAG patrol area, working in company with American, Canadian and other naval forces providing around the clock surveillance and enforcement of United Nations sanctions against Iraq. Many of the vessels to be boarded are smaller Indian cargo dhows or Mandi kutches of approximately 250–500 tons. Though small in size, the cargo dhows presented many unique problems to the boarding parties, primarily limited access to cargo holds and more importantly, a distinct language barrier.

The frigate USS Jarrett participated in a combined naval exercise between the United States and a friendly gulf nation's forces in January 1995. Under the direction of Commander in Chief U.S. Central Command (CINCCENT) and the direct tasking of Commander, U.S. Naval Forces Central Command, Jarrett conducted exercises with three naval ships of a host Arabian nation. Jarrett, home ported in San Diego, was deployed in the Persian Gulf under the operational control of Commander, Destroyer Squadron 50. Jarrett was taking part in Operation Southern Watch under Commander, Middle East Force. The intent of the exercises was to improve the readiness and interoperability between the United States and friendly naval forces.

USS O'Brien returned home 28 August 1998, following a lengthy Middle East Force deployment. O'Brien was assigned various missions during its three and a half month stay in the Persian Gulf. In mid-April the ship participated in the multinational exercise "Neon Spark 98" with British and Bahraini units, serving as flagship for Commander, Destroyer Squadron 50.

The naval control of shipping Exercise Lucky Mariner 13 (LM13) began on November 30, 2012, and included eight time zones, multiple countries, agencies and U.S. Army participation. Commander Task Forces (CTF) 50, 53, 55 and 57, all components of the U.S. 5th Fleet, also participated in LM13. USS Winston S. Churchill served as the flagship for the exercise, hosting Commander Destroyer Squadron 50. The annual exercise between U.S. Navy forces, Royal Navy forces, coalition observers, and Naval Cooperation and Guidance for Shipping (NCAGS), a component of U.S. Fleet Forces Command, is aimed at testing the U.S. NCAGS machinery. It flexes the mobilization and expeditionary nature of NCAGS while integrating with the Maritime Liaison Office, United Kingdom Maritime Trade Organization, U.S. Maritime Administration and the commercial shipping industry.

Winston S. Churchill joined Royal Navy frigate HMS Monmouth, Military Sealift Command ammunition ship USNS Flint and merchant vessels MV Arcturus Voyager and Maron Castor for a convoy training exercise, acting as an active test of NCAGS principles.

On 3 July 2013, U.S. Navy officials told the United States Naval Institute that in an era of tightening budgets and with the wars in Iraq and Afghanistan winding down, the need for as many large ships, like Arleigh Burke-class destroyers, in the Fifth Fleet is less. Destroyer Squadron 50 and Combined Task Force 55 (DESRON 50/CTF-55) commander Captain Joseph Naman said that "..[O]ur numbers of DDGs we have out here have declined over the past year." Patrol craft are taking up a lot of their previous missions. However Naman said destroyers would still remain : "..[T]hey still have a mission here.”

By 2014, the Navy will have ten Cyclone-class patrol ships homeported in Bahrain to operate in the Persian Gulf and as far afield as the Gulf of Oman, Captain Naman said. The ships have a range of missions including providing security for infrastructure, like off-shore oil platforms, as well as providing close-in protection for larger ships such as destroyers. Three ships — USS Tempest, USS Squall, and USS Thunderbolt — arrived in Bahrain on 3 July 2013, to increase the total number of ships to eight. Two more ships — USS Hurricane and USS Monsoon — will arrive by mid-2014.
