= Jack L. Tilley =

12th Sergeant Major of the US Army

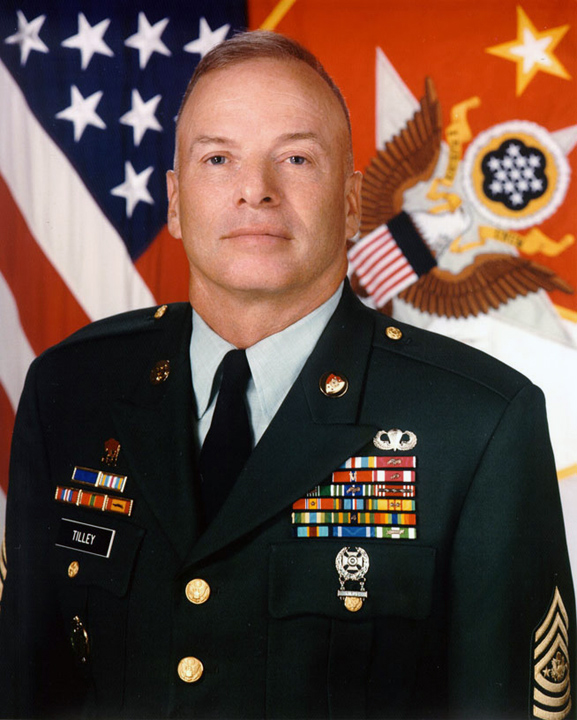
- SMA Jack L. Tilley
- Born: December 3, 1948 (age 77); Vancouver, Washington, U.S.
- Military career
- Allegiance: United States
- Branch: United States Army
- Service years: 1966–1969; 1971–2004
- Rank: Sergeant Major of the Army
- Conflicts: Vietnam War
- Awards: Army Distinguished Service Medal; Defense Superior Service Medal; Legion of Merit (3); Bronze Star Medal with "V" Device; Meritorious Service Medal (2); Army Commendation Medal (2); Army Achievement Medal (3)

Jack L. Tilley (born December 3, 1948) is an American businessman and retired United States Army soldier. He served for almost 37 years in the United States Army. On 19 May 2000 he was appointed the 12th Sergeant Major of the Army (SMA), a post he held until his retirement on 15 January 2004. He was the last Vietnam War veteran to serve in that position.

== Early life ==
Tilley was born in Vancouver, Washington, on 3 December 1948.

== Military career ==
Tilley enlisted in the United States Army in June 1966 under the "Buddy Program" with his friend Barney Boykin. They both attended basic combat training at Fort Lewis, Washington, advanced training at Fort Knox, Kentucky as an armor crewman, and then Airborne School at Fort Benning, Georgia.

Tilley's first assignment was to the Republic of Vietnam with A Troop, 1st Squadron, 4th Cavalry Regt., 1st Infantry Division (aka "Quarter Cav.) as a vehicle crewman. In January 1968, the Tet Offensive began with the enemy attacking U.S. forces throughout Vietnam. He would pull another tank to safety after it was damaged earning a Bronze Star. By the time his tour was complete, Tilley was a Specialist Five (equal to a sergeant).

Tilley's friend Barney was killed in action in 1968 and he would escort his body home.

Tilley was assigned as a drill sergeant at Fort Benning, Georgia, until his enlistment expired, including attending Drill Sergeant School where he was converted from Specialist to Sergeant. Tilley left the army in 1969 for two years despite being promoted to staff sergeant. He rejoined in 1971 and was sent to Fort Polk, Louisiana with duty as a drill sergeant.

Tilley was reassigned to Fort Lewis, Washington in 1974 due to his son Brian being diagnosed with pneumococcal meningitis and Fort Lewis having specialized doctors. He was assigned to the 2nd Bn., 77th Armor Regt., 9th Infantry Division. In 1976, he was sent to Friedberg, Germany and the 3rd Bn., 32nd Armor Regt. In 1979, he returned to Fort Knox and the Armor School as a tank instructor and began as the first tank commander to train with the new M1 Abrams main battle tank. In 1984, Tilley was promoted to master sergeant and was made a first sergeant. He was put in charge of the Basic NCO Course at Knox in 1985.

In 1986, Tilley attended the Sergeants Major Academy at Fort Bliss, Texas and was sent to South Korea in 1987 as first sergeant of Company C, 1st Bn., 72nd Armor Regt. 2nd Infantry Division. In 1988, he would return to Fort Knox as command sergeant major (CSM) of 1st Bn., 10th Cavalry Rgt., 194th Separate Armored Brigade. He would quickly become the brigade CSM. In 1994 he would be CSM of the 1st Armored Division in Bad Kreuznach, where he and the 1AD would be part of Task Force Eagle of the NATO Implementation Force (IFOR) for a year.

Tilley would become the CSM for Space and Missile Defense Command (SMDC) in Arlington, Virginia where much of his new command were civilians not soldiers. Five months later (in 1998) he was selected as Central Command (CENTCOM) senior enlisted adviser.

On 23 June 2000, he was sworn in as Sergeant Major of the Army. As SMA, Tilley started the Nominative Command Sergeant Major Conference, a week-long gathering at the U.S. Army Sergeants Major Academy at Fort Bliss. He also had to support the controversial conversion to the black beret army wide. From 11 September 2001 until he retired, he would spend much of his time visiting with soldiers fighting in the Global War on Terror. He would retire on 15 January 2004.

== Awards and decorations ==
Basic Parachutist Badge
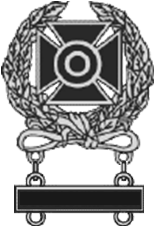
Expert Marksmanship Badge with one weapon bar
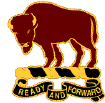
10th Cavalry Regiment Distinctive Unit Insignia
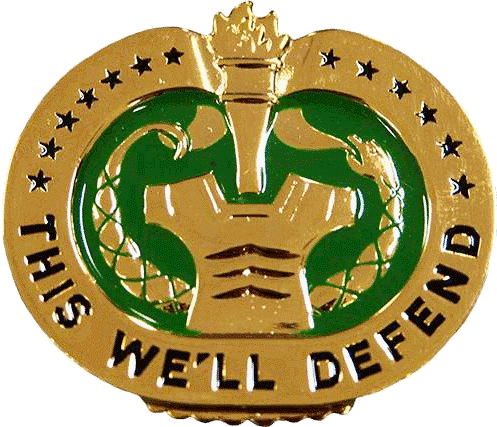
Drill Sergeant Identification Badge

Army Distinguished Service Medal
Defense Superior Service Medal
Legion of Merit with two bronze oak leaf clusters
Bronze Star Medal with Valor Device
Meritorious Service Medal with oak leaf cluster
Army Commendation Medal with oak leaf cluster
Army Achievement Medal with two oak leaf clusters
Presidential Unit Citation
Joint Meritorious Unit Award
Valorous Unit Award
Superior Unit Award
Army Good Conduct Medal (11 awards)
National Defense Service Medal with 2 service stars
Armed Forces Expeditionary Medal
Vietnam Service Medal with two service stars
Armed Forces Service Medal
NCO Professional Development with award numeral 4
Army Service Ribbon
Overseas Service Ribbon with award numeral 2
NATO Medal
Vietnam Gallantry Cross Unit Citation
Vietnam Campaign Medal

- 11 service stripes.

== Post-military career ==
After Tilley retired, he served as the Chief Executive of JTilley, Inc., a services company based in Tampa, Florida, that specializes in placing military leaders into corporate America.

=== Philanthropy ===
Tilley is the co-founder, Chairman, and CEO of the non-profit American Freedom Foundation. This organization creates awareness and building support of their service, sacrifice and needs through partnerships with military-focused organizations. The organization also sponsors military career fairs and hiring events regularly in major military areas around the country. These events are usually in conjunction with high-profile concerts or entertainment. Special emphasis is always given to the men and women who were wounded in action.

== As an author ==
Tilley is the author of the book Soldier for Life: Lessons from the 12th Sergeant Major of the Army Jack L. Tilley.

Military offices
Preceded by Robert E. Hall	Sergeant Major of the Army; 2000–2004	Succeeded by Kenneth O. Preston
