= Kenneth Preston =

13th Sergeant Major of the US Army

Kenneth O. Preston
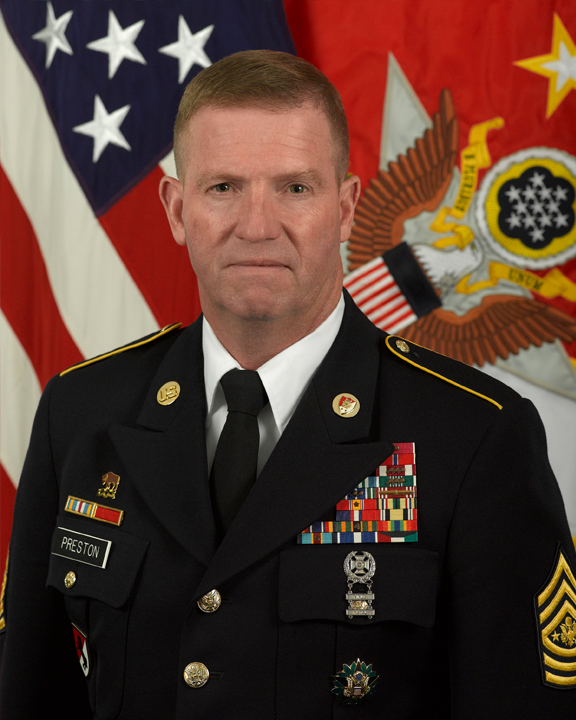
- Preston in 2010
- Born: February 18, 1957 (age 69); Mount Savage, Maryland, U.S.
- Military career
- Allegiance: United States
- Branch: United States Army
- Service years: 1975–2011
- Rank: Sergeant Major of the Army
- Conflicts: Gulf War: Operation Desert Storm; Iraq War: Operation Iraqi Freedom
- Awards: Army Distinguished Service Medal; Legion of Merit (2); Bronze Star Medal; Meritorious Service Medal (4); Joint Service Commendation Medal; Army Commendation Medal (4); Army Achievement Medal (3)

Kenneth O. Preston (born February 18, 1957) is a retired United States Army soldier who served as the Sergeant Major of the Army. He was sworn in as the 13th Sergeant Major of the Army on 15 January 2004. Preston served 7 years and 2 months as Sergeant Major of the Army (January 2004-March 2011) making him the longest serving Sergeant Major of the Army to date.

== Early life and education ==
Preston was born 18 February 1957 in Annapolis, Maryland. His father served in the U.S. Army, his mother in the U.S. Air Force and his grandfather in the Army during World War I. They would move the family to Mount Savage, Maryland.

His civilian education includes an Associate of Arts degree in vocational education and instruction from the University of Louisville and both a Bachelor of Science degree in business administration and a Master of Business Administration degree from Trident University International.

== Military career ==
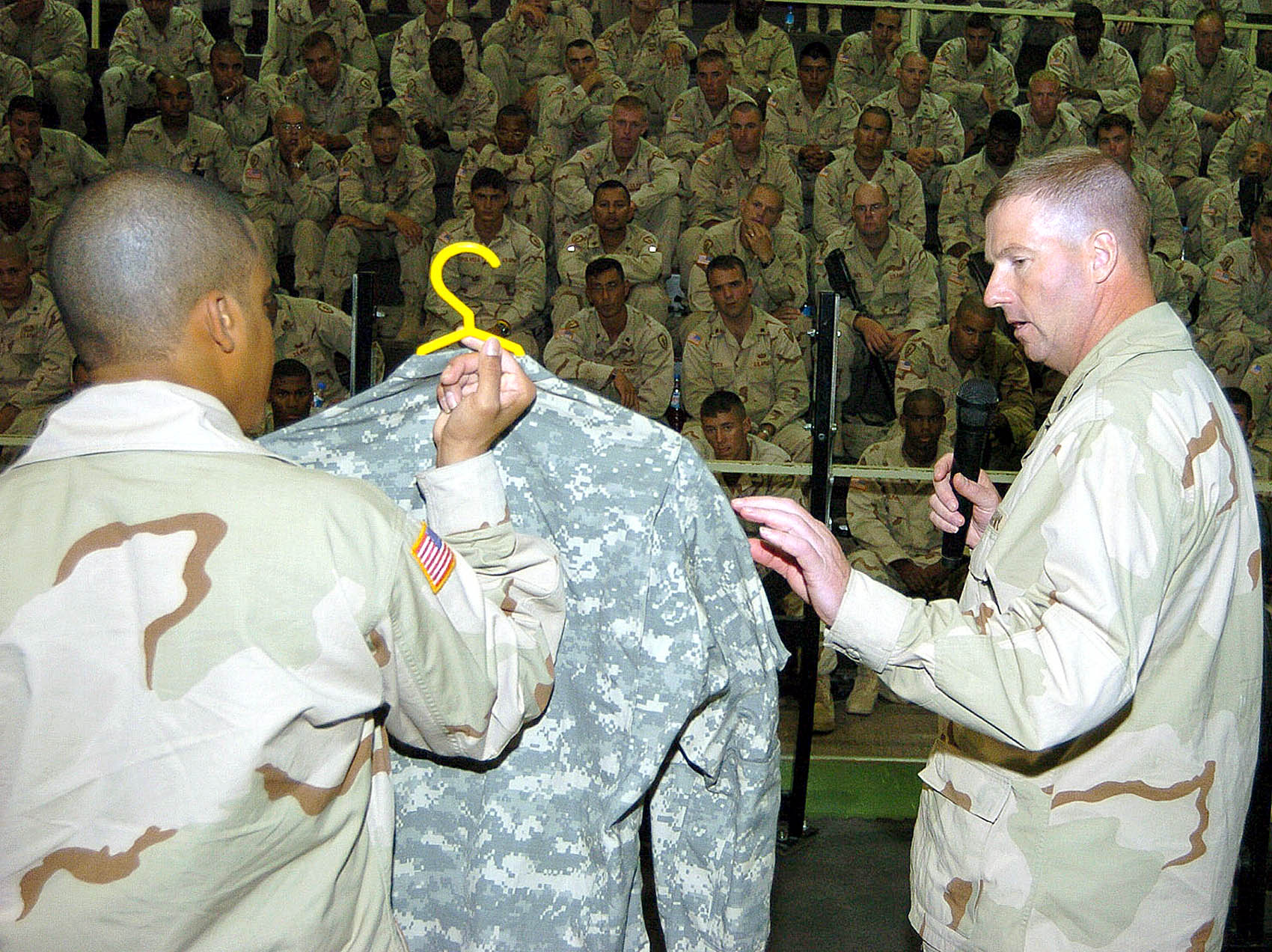
Preston at Kirkuk Air Base in August 2004.

Preston enlisted in the Army 30 June 1975. He attended Basic Training in A Company, 11th Training Battalion, 5th Training Brigade, Fort Knox, Kentucky and Armor Advanced Individual Training in D Company, 3rd Training Battalion, 1st Training Brigade Fort Knox, Kentucky, graduating in October 1975.

Preston and his new wife would go to their first duty station at Fort Hood, Texas with Headquarters and Headquarters Co., 2nd Bn., 8th Cavalry Regt., 1st Cavalry Division. By the end of his time at Fort Hood he had been promoted to sergeant. In February 1978 he was sent to Company B, 1st Bn., 33rd Armor Regt., 3rd Armored Division, in Gelnhausen, Germany where he would attend the Basic NCO Course. He would also earn an Army Commendation Medal for improving the gunnery of his unit and would be inducted into the Sergeant Morales Club. Before leaving Germany he was promoted to staff sergeant.

He would return to Fort Knox in February 1981 as an instructor at the Armor School. He became proficient in the M60A1 Patton, M60A3 Patton, and the new XM1 Abrams tanks. Due to his skill, he was selected to be an instructor at the United Kingdom Royal Armoured Corps Gunnery School in October 1983 in Lulworth, England where he would be promoted to sergeant first class.

In October 1985, Preston would again return to Knox and the Armor School as an instructor on the M1A1. After the school, he would serve with 12th Cavalry Regt. and 10th Cavalry Regt. as a platoon sergeant at Knox. In 1989, he would return to Germany and the 11th Armored Cavalry Regt. in Fulda. The 11th ACR would deploy to Kuwait after the Gulf War for Operation Positive Force in 1991. In 1992 he would be promoted to first sergeant.

In 1992 Preston would return to Fort Knox and the Armor School where he would be the first sergeant of the Basic NCO Course. By 1994, he was considering retirement. His command sergeant major recommended he wait for the E-9 promotion list to be announced and in June 1995, Preston was in Fort Bliss, Texas attending the Sergeants Major Academy.

His first command sergeant major (CSM) assignment in 1996 was with a battalion of the 1st Cavalry Division at Fort Hood. By 1998 he was the CSM of 3rd Brigade, 1st Cavalry Division. He would move to Germany in 2000 as CSM of 1st Armored Division. He would move up again in 2001 as V Corps CSM. He would deploy to Kuwait and Iraq in 2003 as part of Combined Joint Task Force–7.

On 15 January 2004, Preston was sworn in as Sergeant Major of the Army. He focused on improving pay, housing, medical and mental health for soldiers. As a part of the Army Family Covenant, the army built or improved 80,000 housing units at 36 army bases and opened more than 60 child care centers. He also wanted to improve the NCO education system because he had seen that small units and junior NCOs were the primary leaders in modern war. On 1 March 2011 Preston retired.

== Post-military career ==
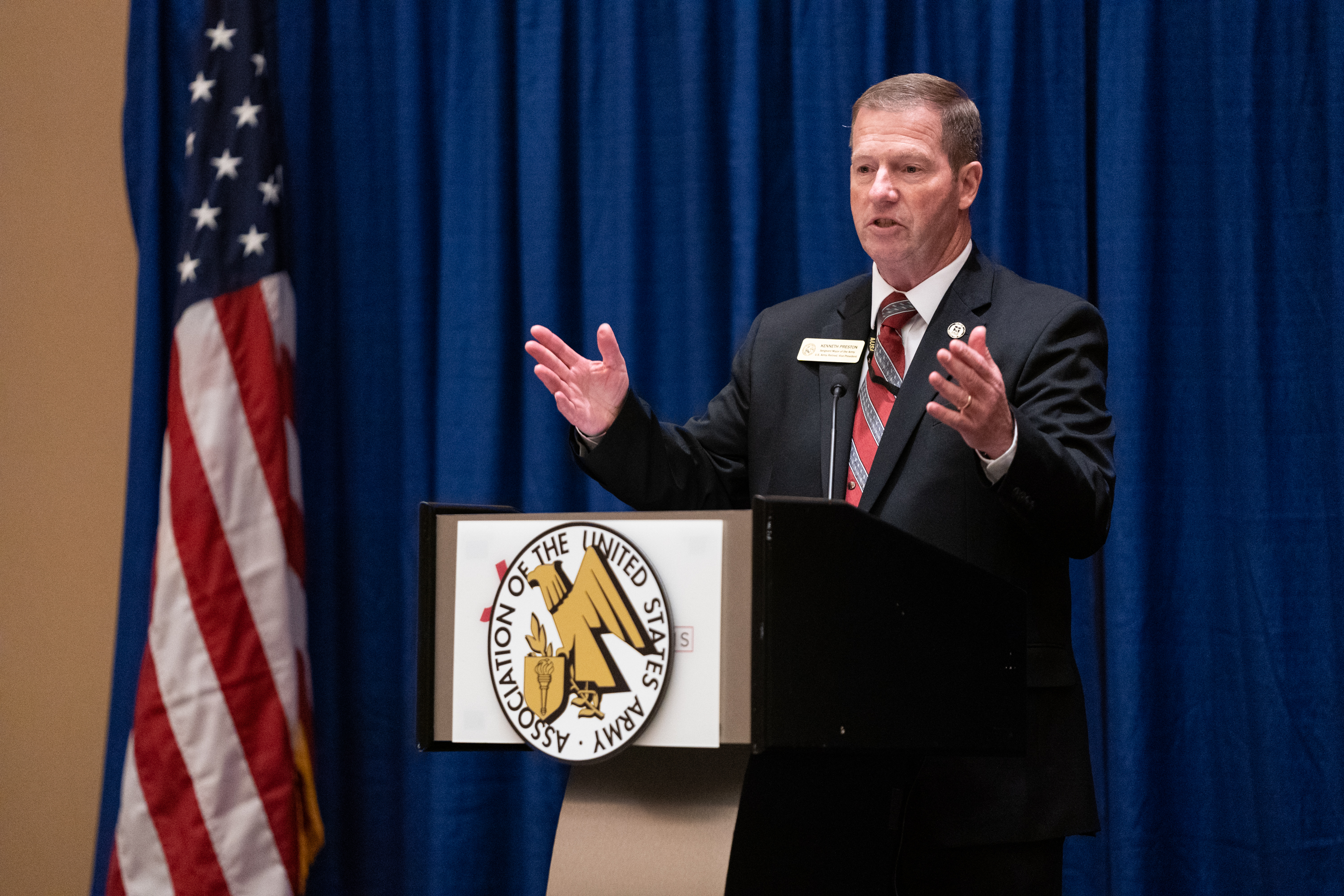
Preston speaks at an Association of the United States Army breakfast in 2019

Since August 2011, Preston has volunteered as the co-chair of the Chief of Staff of the Army's Retired Soldier Counsel. The 14-member counsel works with the Army staff, supporting agencies and subject matter experts to review all recommendations and issues submitted from the field impacting retired soldiers and surviving spouses from the Army. The counsel prepares a final report with all recommendations for the Chief of Staff of the Army.

Preston also volunteers as a member of the Board of Directors for Homes for Our Troops since October 2011. Home for Our Troops is a nonprofit organization with the mission to build and donate specially adapted homes to severely wounded veterans at no cost. Severely wounded veterans in need of a specially adapted home as qualified by the VA predominantly spend all or part of their daily life in a wheelchair. Many of these veterans are young with young children. A specially adapted home allows the veteran total access to all rooms in the home to including a child's nursery, use of all kitchen and laundry facilities and garage to support their reintegration back into their family and their community.

Preston has served as the Vice President of noncommissioned officer and soldier programs at the Association of the United States Army (AUSA) since May 2013. AUSA is the Army's professional educational association and serves as a voice for the Army and support for the soldier.

== Awards and decorations ==
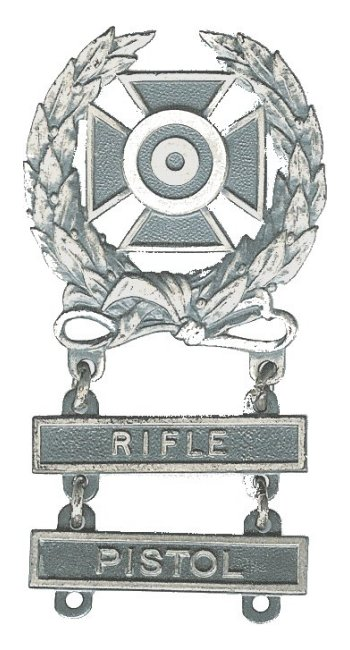
Expert Marksmanship Badge with Rifle and Pistol bars
Army Staff Identification Badge
11th Armored Cavalry Regiment Combat Service Identification Badge
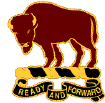
10th Cavalry Regiment Distinctive Unit Insignia
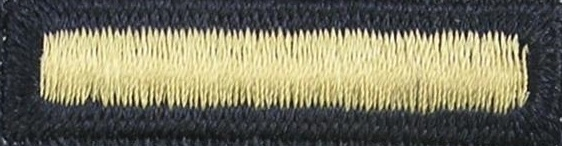
3 Overseas Service Bars
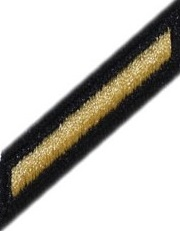
12 Service stripes

Army Distinguished Service Medal
Legion of Merit with one oak leaf cluster
Bronze Star Medal
Meritorious Service Medal with three oak leaf clusters
Joint Service Commendation Medal
Army Commendation Medal with three oak leaf clusters
Army Achievement Medal with two oak leaf clusters
Joint Meritorious Unit Award
Meritorious Unit Commendation
Army Good Conduct Medal (11 awards)
National Defense Service Medal with service star
Southwest Asia Service Medal
Kosovo Campaign Medal
Iraq Campaign Medal
Global War on Terrorism Service Medal
NCO Professional Development Ribbon with bronze award numeral 4
Army Service Ribbon
Overseas Service Ribbon with award numeral 5
NATO Medal for Kosovo
Kuwait Liberation Medal (Kuwait)

Military offices
Preceded by Jack L. Tilley	Sergeant Major of the Army; 2004–2011	Succeeded by Raymond F. Chandler
