= Michael A. Grinston =

16th Sergeant Major of the US Army

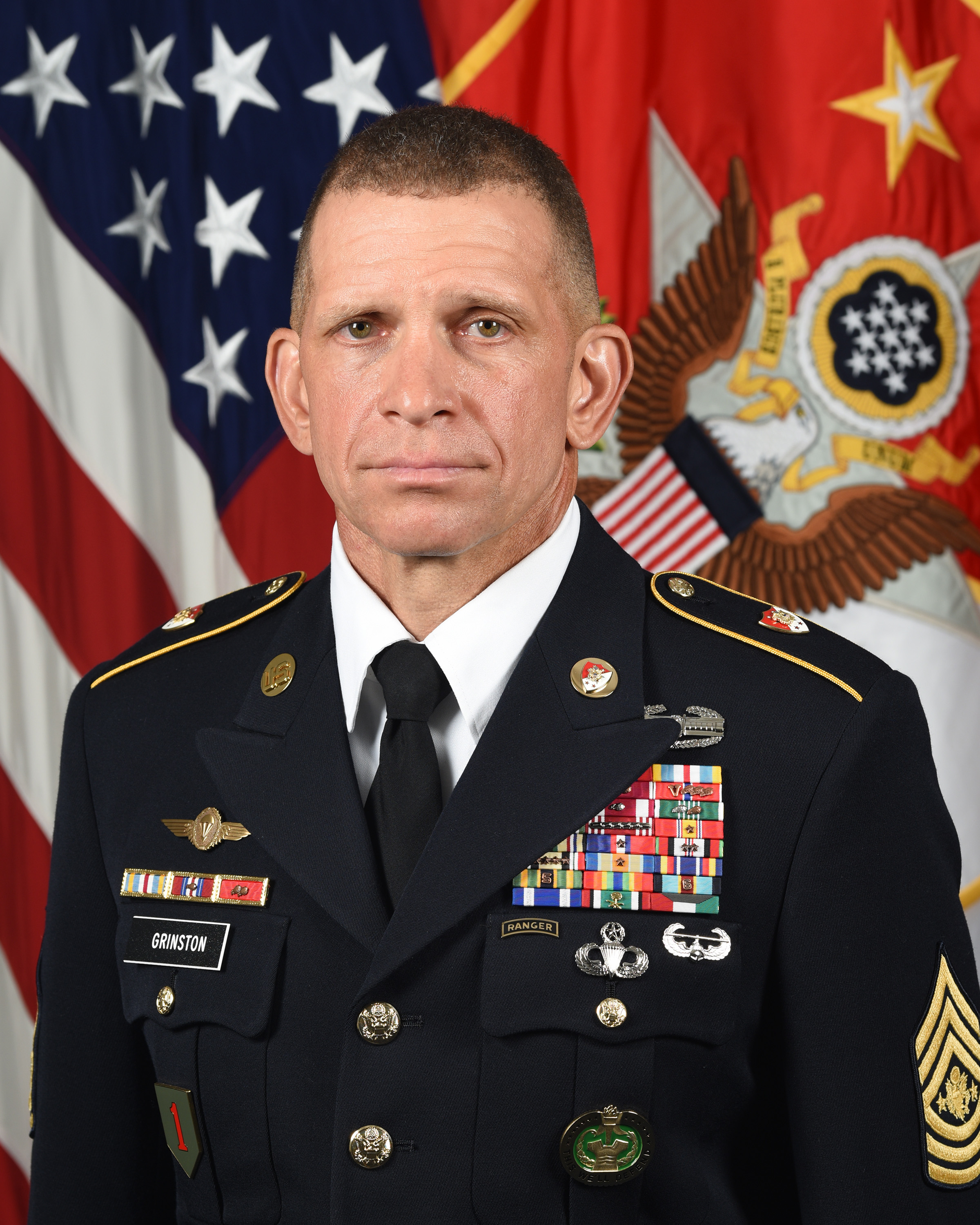
- Grinston in August 2019
- Born: 1968 (age 57–58); Alabama, U.S.
- Military career
- Allegiance: United States
- Branch: United States Army
- Service years: 1987–2023
- Rank: Sergeant Major of the Army
- Units: Headquarters, Department of the Army; United States Army Forces Command; 1st Infantry Division; 4th Brigade, 101st Airborne Division; 170th Infantry Brigade; 2nd Battalion, 15th Field Artillery Regiment
- Conflicts: Gulf War; Iraq War; War in Afghanistan; Operation Inherent Resolve
- Awards: Army Distinguished Service Medal; Defense Superior Service Medal; Legion of Merit (3); Bronze Star Medal with "V"
- Michael A. Grinston's voice Grinston's opening statement at a House Armed Services subcommittee hearing on the state of enlisted personnel Recorded March 9, 2023

Michael Anthony Grinston (born 1968) is a retired soldier of the United States Army who served as the 16th Sergeant Major of the Army from 2019 to 2023. Prior to his term as Sergeant Major of the Army, he served as the senior enlisted leader for United States Army Forces Command.

== Military career ==
This work incorporates material in the public domain in the United States because it is a work of the United States Federal Government under the terms of Title 17, Chapter 1, Section 105 of the US Code.

Grinston is a native of Jasper, Alabama, and enlisted in the United States Army in October 1987. He attended Basic Training and Advanced Individual Training as an artilleryman at Fort Sill, Oklahoma. Grinston's deployments include Operations Desert Storm and Desert Shield, Iraqi Freedom, New Dawn, Inherent Resolve, Enduring Freedom, and Kosovo.

Grinston has been assigned to: 1st Battalion, 84th Field Artillery Regiment at Fort Lewis, Washington; 2nd Battalion, 320th Field Artillery Regiment at Fort Campbell, Kentucky; two tours at Ledward Barracks in Schweinfurt, Germany with the 5th Battalion, 41st Field Artillery Regiment and 1st Battalion, 7th Field Artillery Regiment; 1st Battalion, 39th Field Artillery Regiment at Fort Bragg, North Carolina; 1st Battalion, 22nd Field Artillery Regiment at Fort Sill, Oklahoma; 319th Field Artillery Regiment; and 1st Battalion, 508th Infantry Regiment and 2nd Battalion, 503rd Infantry Regiment at Caserma Ederle in Vicenza, Italy. His service as a command sergeant major (CSM) includes assignments as a battalion CSM with 2nd Battalion, 15th Field Artillery Regiment at Fort Drum, New York, Observer Controller CSM at Hohenfels, Germany, Brigade CSM 170th Infantry Brigade in Baumholder, Germany, brigade CSM 4th Brigade, 101st Airborne Division at Fort Campbell, Kentucky, 1st Infantry Division CSM at Fort Riley, Kansas, and I Corps at Joint Base Lewis–McChord, Washington. As the 1st Infantry Division CSM, Grinston served as the senior enlisted leader for the army's first deployment of a division headquarters in support of Operation Inherent Resolve. He also served as the command sergeant major for United States Army Forces Command.

Grinston was sworn in as the 16th Sergeant Major of the Army on August 9, 2019. As the Sergeant Major of the Army, Grinston was the Army Chief of Staff's personal adviser on matters affecting the enlisted force. He devoted the majority of his time traveling throughout the army to observe training and interact with soldiers and their families. He sat on a variety of councils and boards that made decisions affecting enlisted soldiers and their families and routinely invited to testify before Congress. Grinston was the public face of the army's Non-commissioned Officer Corps, representing the NCO Corps to the American people in the media and through business and community engagements.

Grinston's military education included all levels of the Non-commissioned Officer Education System. He was a graduate of Ranger School, Airborne School, Drill Sergeant School, Air Assault School, How the Army Runs Course, the Equal Opportunity Leaders Course and the Keystone Course. Grinston holds a Bachelor of Arts in Business Administration from the University of Maryland Global Campus.

Grinston's retirement ceremony was on August 3, 2023; he relinquished responsibility as SMA to Michael R. Weimer on August 4.

== Post-military career ==
On January 1, 2024, Grinston became director and chief executive officer of the non-profit organization Army Emergency Relief. AER is the official non-profit of the U.S. Army.

== Personal life ==
Grinston is biracial. He was born to an African-American father and a white mother. They divorced when he was three years old. He is married to Alexandra Grinston, and they are the parents of two children.

== Awards and decorations ==
Combat Action Badge
Ranger tab
Master Parachutist Badge
Air Assault Badge
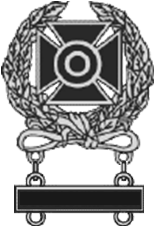
Expert Marksman Badge with one weapon bar
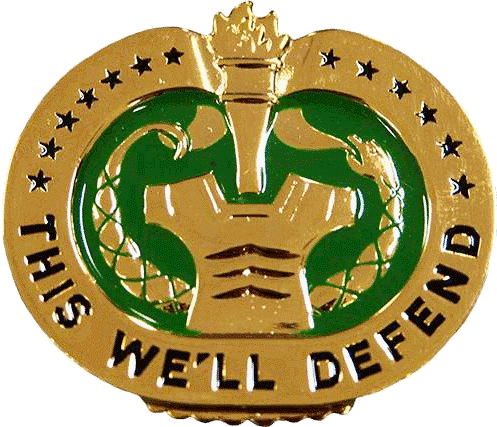
Drill Sergeant Identification Badge
1st Infantry Division Shoulder Sleeve Insignia
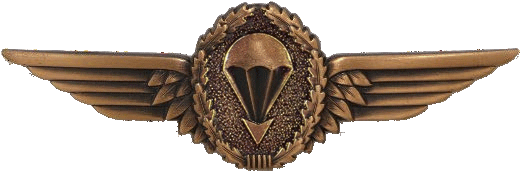
German Parachutist Badge in bronze
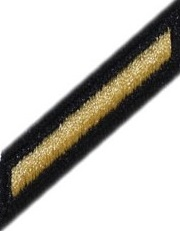
11 Service stripes
9 Overseas Service Bars

Army Distinguished Service Medal
Defense Superior Service Medal
Legion of Merit with two bronze oak leaf clusters
Bronze Star Medal with "V" device with three oak-leaf clusters
Meritorious Service Medal with silver oak leaf cluster
Army Commendation Medal with silver oak leaf cluster
Army Achievement Medal with two silver oak leaf clusters
Joint Meritorious Unit Award
Valorous Unit Award with oak leaf cluster
Meritorious Unit Commendation with two oak leaf clusters
Army Good Conduct Medal (11 awards)
National Defense Service Medal with one bronze service star
Southwest Asia Service Medal with two service stars
Kosovo Campaign Medal with service star
Afghanistan Campaign Medal with two service stars
Iraq Campaign Medal with four service stars
Inherent Resolve Campaign Medal with service star
Global War on Terrorism Service Medal
NCO Professional Development Ribbon with bronze award numeral 5
Army Service Ribbon
Army Overseas Service Ribbon with award numeral 6
NATO Medal for service with ISAF
Kuwait Liberation Medal (Saudi Arabia)
Kuwait Liberation Medal (Kuwait)

Military offices
Preceded by Daniel A. Dailey	Sergeant Major of the Army; 2019–2023	Succeeded by Michael R. Weimer
