= Daniel A. Dailey =

15th Sergeant Major of the US Army

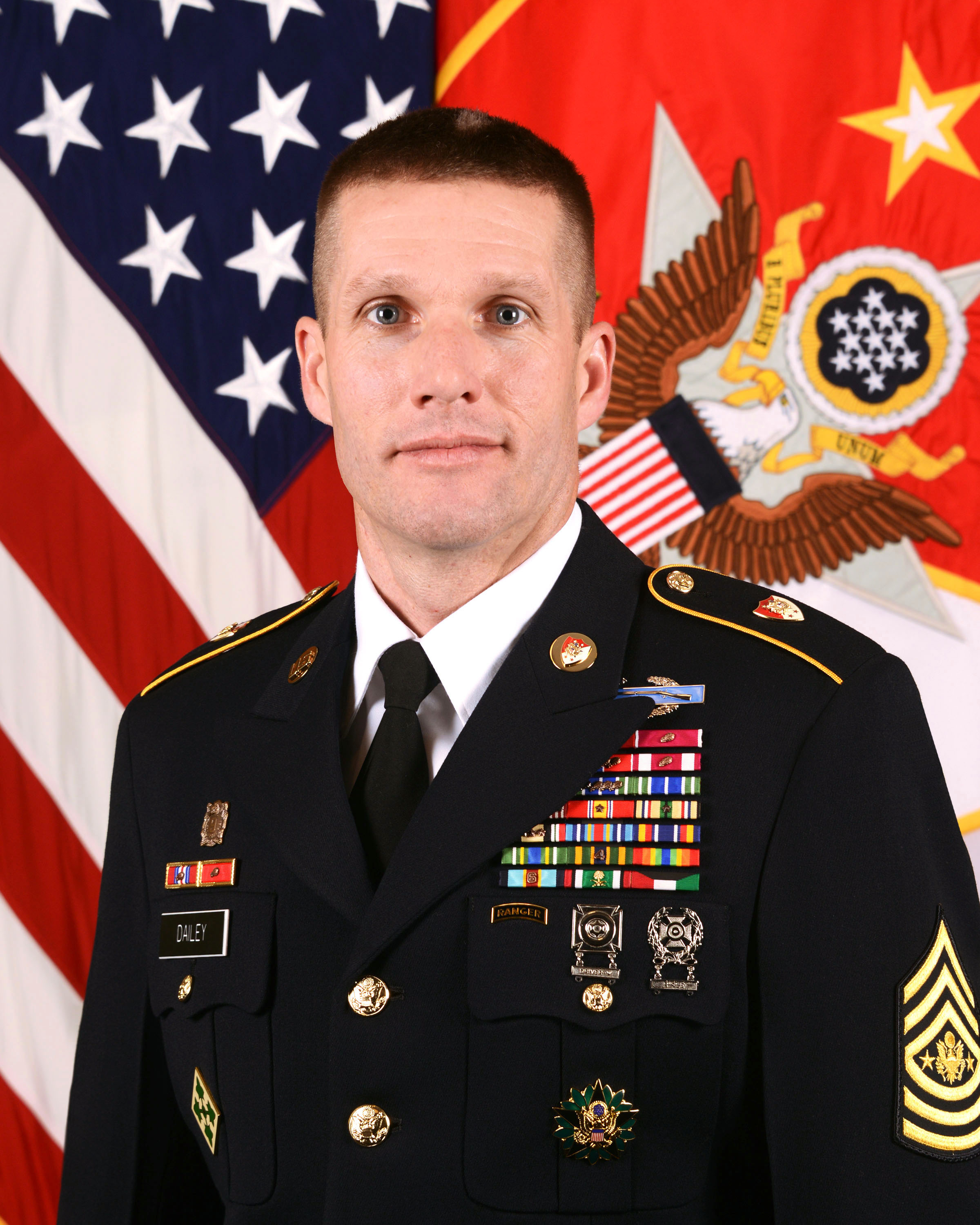
- Dailey at the Pentagon in January 2015
- Born: October 5, 1969 (age 57); Palmerton, Pennsylvania, U.S.
- Military career
- Allegiance: United States
- Branch: United States Army
- Service years: 1989–2020
- Rank: Sergeant Major of the Army
- Conflicts: Gulf War; Iraq War: Siege of Sadr City
- Awards: Army Distinguished Service Medal (3); Legion of Merit (2); Bronze Star Medal (4) with "V" Device; Meritorious Service Medal (2); Army Commendation Medal (7); Army Achievement Medal (10)

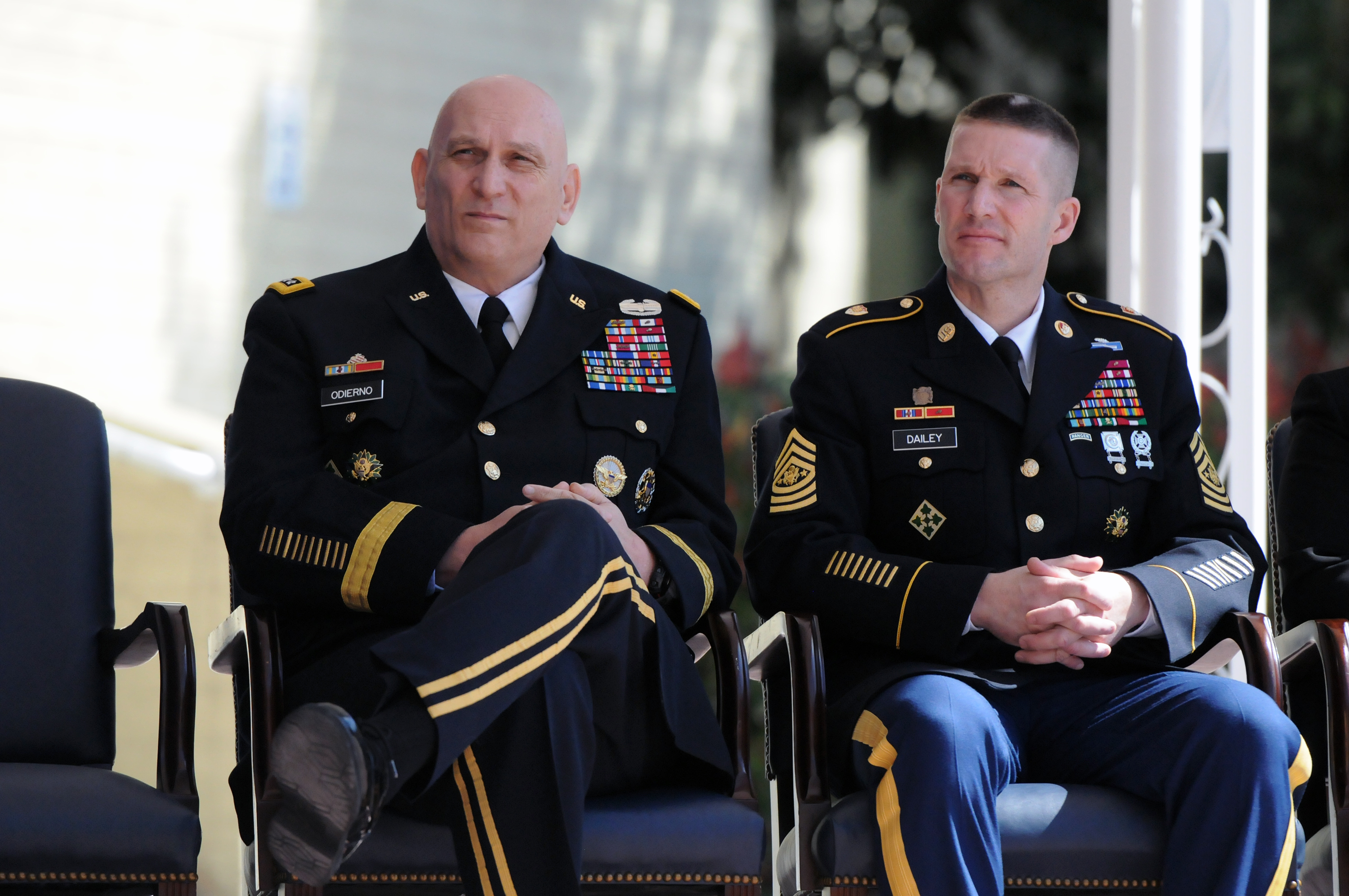
Army Gen. Raymond Odierno, chief of staff of the Army, and Sgt. Maj. of the Army Daniel Dailey

Daniel A. Dailey (born January 11, 1969) is a former United States Army soldier who served as the 15th Sergeant Major of the Army from January 30, 2015, to August 9, 2019. Prior to his tenure as the Sergeant Major of the Army, he served as the Command Sergeant Major for the United States Army Training and Doctrine Command.

== Early life and education ==
Dailey was born in Palmerton, Pennsylvania, on December 27, 1969.

In 1989, after graduating from high school, he enlisted in the United States Army at age 17 as an 11B (Infantryman). He attended Basic Training and Advanced Individual Training at Fort Benning, Georgia. He was awarded a Bachelor of Science degree in history from Excelsior University in Albany, New York.

== Military career ==
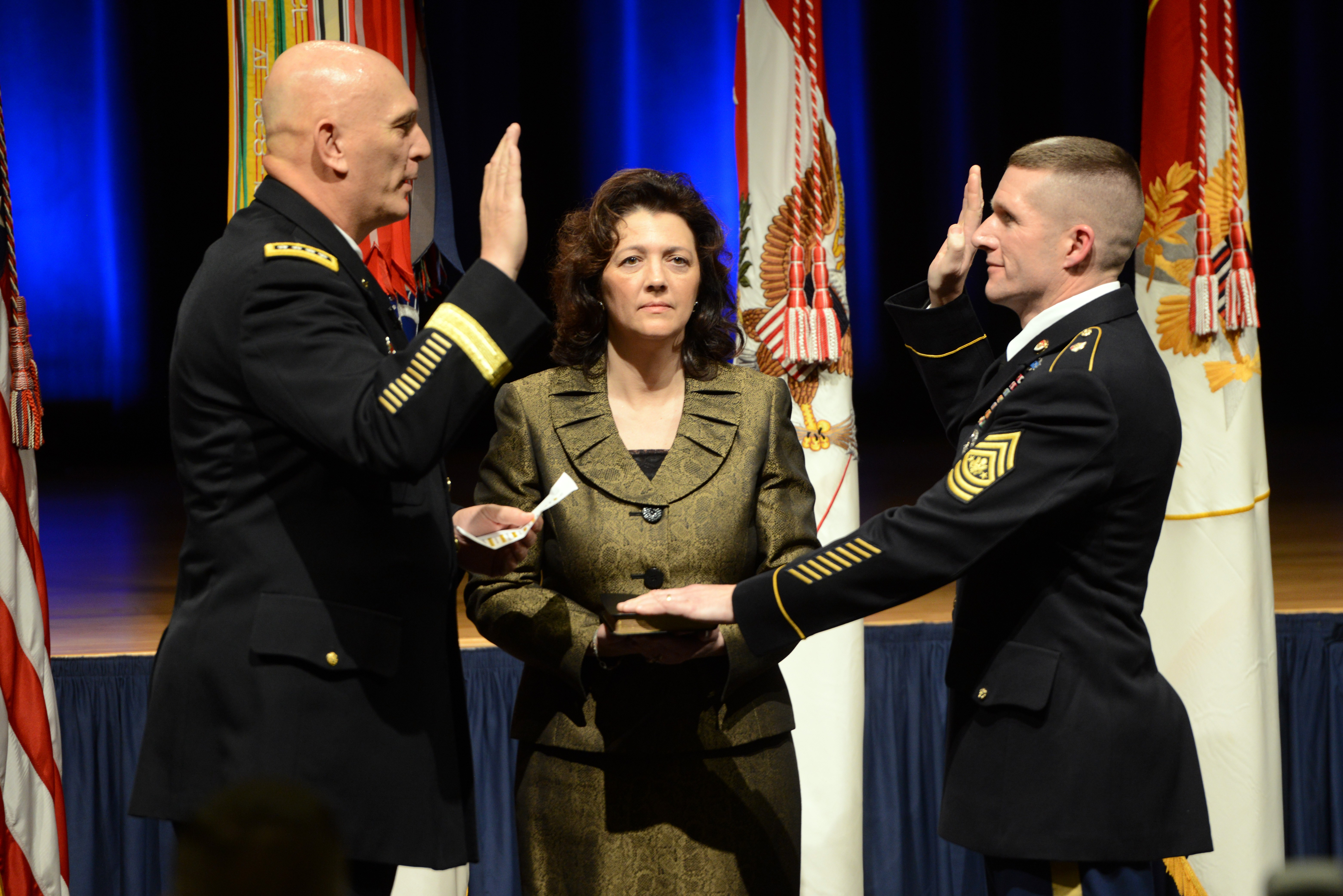
Dailey is sworn in as the 15th sergeant major of the Army by Army chief of staff General Raymond T. Odierno on January 30, 2015

Dailey's military education includes Basic Noncommissioned Officer's Course, the Bradley Master Gunner Course, the Advanced Noncommissioned Officer's Course, First Sergeants Course, the Force Management Course, the Keystone Course, the Sergeants Major Academy, and the Command Sergeants Major course. He has served in the 1st, 2nd, 3rd and 4th Infantry Divisions.

Dailey is decorated with the Bronze Star Medal with Valor for his leadership during the Siege of Sadr City. Later, he was selected as the 4th Infantry Division command sergeant major in 2009. Prior to his selection as the Sergeant Major of the Army, he served as the command sergeant major of the United States Army Training and Doctrine Command.

As Sergeant Major of the Army, Dailey served as the Chief of Staff of the United States Army's personal adviser on all enlisted-related matters, particularly in areas affecting soldier training and quality of life. In August 2019, Dailey stepped down as Sergeant Major of the Army and was succeeded in his post by Command Sergeant Major Michael A. Grinston. Dailey's official retirement date was January 1, 2020.

== Personal life ==
Dailey is a member of the Order of Saint Maurice (Centurion) and a member of the Distinguished Sergeant Audie Murphy Club.

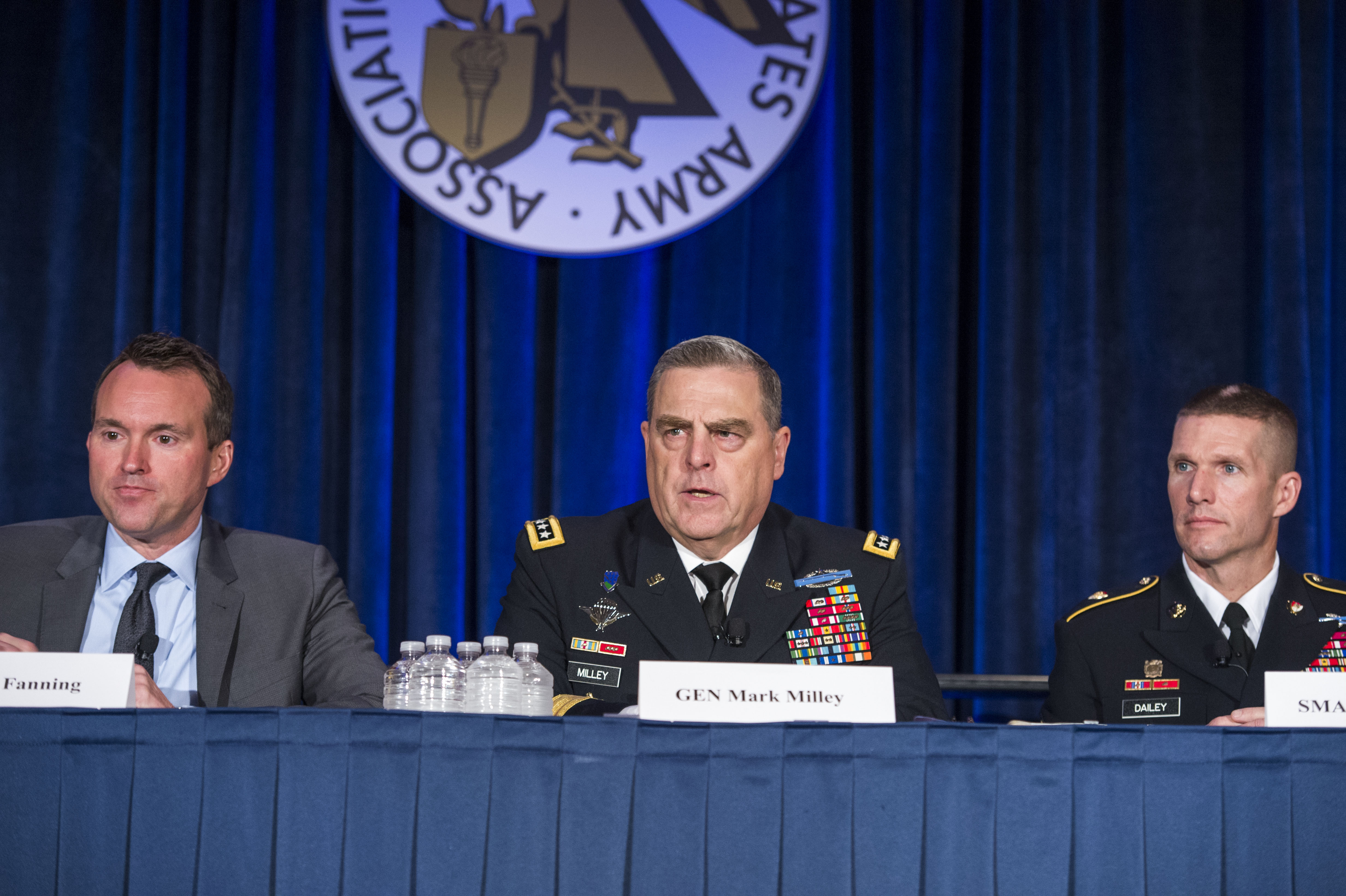
Eric Fanning, Mark A. Milley and Daniel A. Dailey

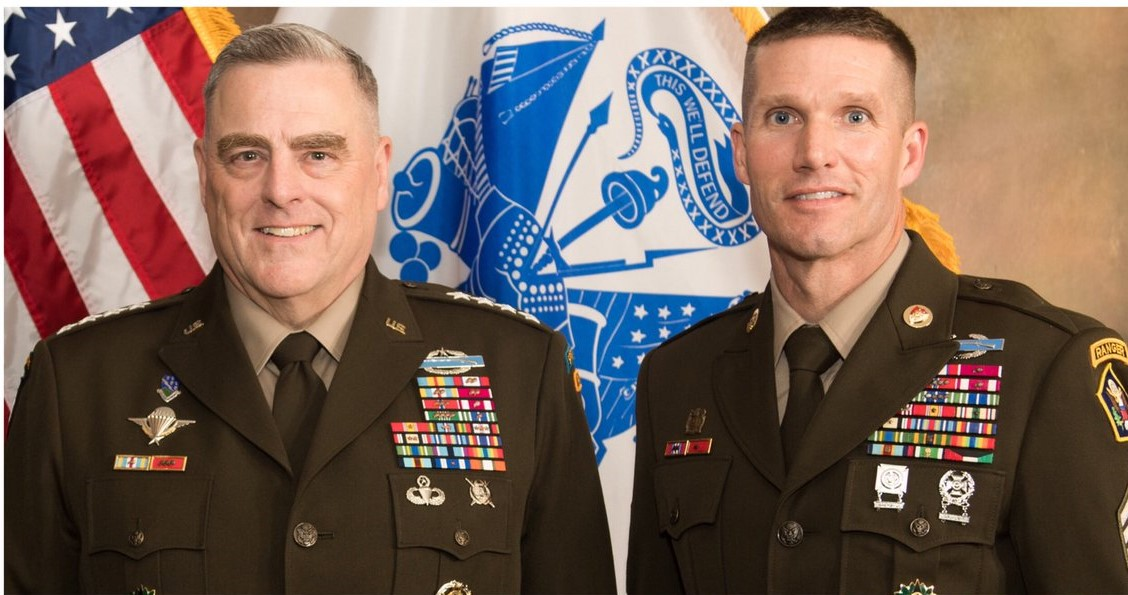
Dailey and Milley in the new Army "Pinks and Greens".

== Awards and decorations ==
Combat Infantryman Badge
Expert Infantryman Badge
Ranger tab
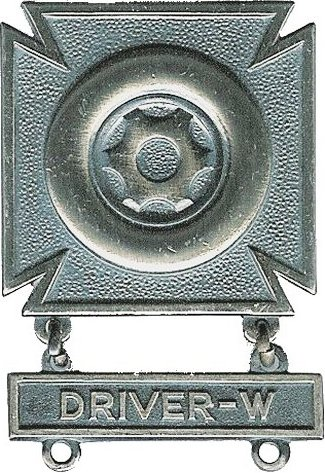
Wheeled Vehicle Driver Badge (Driver-W)
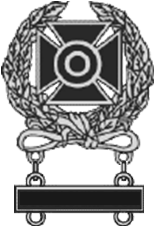
Expert Rifle Badge
Army Staff Identification Badge
4th Infantry Division Shoulder Sleeve Insignia
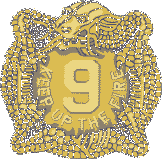
9th Infantry Regiment Distinctive Unit Insignia
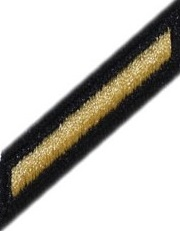
10 Service stripes
8 Overseas Service Bars

Army Distinguished Service Medal with 2 bronze oak leaf clusters
Legion of Merit with oak leaf cluster
Bronze Star with "V" device and three oak leaf clusters
Meritorious Service Medal with oak leaf cluster
Army Commendation Medal with six oak leaf clusters
Army Achievement Medal with eight oak leaf clusters
(second ribbon to denote tenth award due to accoutrement spacing)
Valorous Unit Award with two oak leaf clusters
Meritorious Unit Commendation with oak leaf cluster
Army Good Conduct Medal (10 awards)
National Defense Service Medal with one bronze service star
Southwest Asia Service Medal with one campaign star
Iraq Campaign Medal with five campaign stars
Global War on Terrorism Expeditionary Medal
Global War on Terrorism Service Medal
Korea Defense Service Medal
NCO Professional Development Ribbon with bronze award numeral 5
Army Service Ribbon
Army Overseas Service Ribbon with award numeral 6
Kuwait Liberation Medal (Saudi Arabia)
Kuwait Liberation Medal (Kuwait)

Military offices
Preceded by Raymond F. Chandler	Sergeant Major of the Army; 2015–2019	Succeeded by Michael A. Grinston
