= Richard A. Kidd =

Ninth Sergeant Major of the US Army

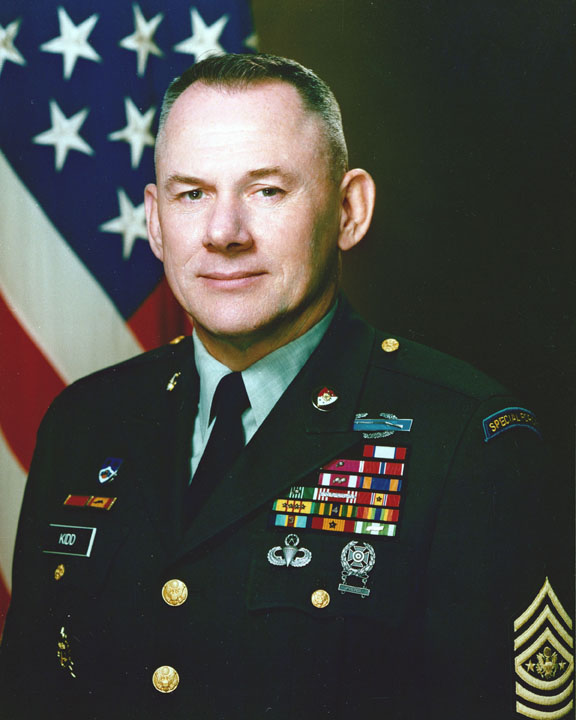
- Born: June 24, 1943 (age 83); Morehead, Kentucky, U.S.
- Military career
- Allegiance: United States
- Branch: United States Army
- Service years: 1962–1995
- Rank: Sergeant Major of the Army
- Conflicts: Vietnam War
- Awards: Army Distinguished Service Medal (2); Defense Superior Service Medal; Legion of Merit (2); Bronze Star Medal; Meritorious Service Medal (2); Air Medal; Army Commendation Medal (2)

Richard A. Kidd (born June 24, 1943) is a retired United States Army soldier who served as the ninth Sergeant Major of the Army (SMA). He was sworn in on July 2, 1991, and served until his term expired in June 1995.

== Early life ==
Kidd was born in Morehead, Kentucky, on 24 June 1943. His father Samuel D. Kidd had served in World War II and retired as a chief warrant officer. He had grown up on various army posts in the United States and Germany. He also worked as a branch manager for the Army and Air Force Exchange Service (AAFES).

== Military career ==
Kidd enlisted in the Army on 30 March 1962 at Fort Holabird, Maryland, and was send to Fort Gordon, Georgia, for basic training. He went on to advanced training as a radio repairman at Fort Benning, Georgia. He would then attend airborne training.

His first assignment would be in Mainz, Germany with the 504th Infantry Regt., 8th Infantry Division. By 1965 he was a sergeant and was sent to Fort Bragg, but ended up going to Vietnam in January 1966 with Company C, 2nd Bn., 5th Cavalry Regt., 1st Cavalry Division where he was a promoted to staff sergeant and he served as a platoon sergeant.

He returned to Fort Bragg in January 1967 and attended Special Forces school and was the top graduate in his class. Kidd next went to Fort Holabird to the Operations and Intelligence course. He would return to Vietnam in November 1970 as an advisor to South Vietnamese units.

Kidd returned to the states and was assigned to the U.S. Army Advisory Group, Fifth Army, at Fort Sheridan, Illinois, as the senior enlisted adviser to the Army National Guard and Army Reserve. He attended the Advanced NCO Course in September 1972 and was promoted to master sergeant. He then went to the Army Sergeants Major Academy at Fort Bliss, Texas.

After Fort Bliss he was sent to Camp Howze, Korea, in February 1977 with the 1st Bn., 32nd Infantry Regt. where he served as intelligence sergeant and operations sergeant. By March 1978, Kidd was at his "follow on" assignment at Fort Lewis, Washington with 2nd Bn., 1st Infantry Regt., 9th Infantry Division, where he would be promoted to sergeant major. As an aviation battalion Command Sergeant Major, Kidd was working with female soldiers directly for the first time in his army career.

In November 1979, he moved back to the infantry as a CSM. He next went to Germany in 1981 as the commandant of the 1st Armored Division's NCO Academy for three years. He then went back to being a battalion CSM in the 23rd Infantry Division, a brigade CSM in the 9th Infantry Division, and a corps CSM for I Corps.

On 1 July 1987 he became the Sergeant Major of the Army (SMA). Like his predecessor, Kidd visited the troops in Somalia, Macedonia and Haiti. He redesigned the shoulder insignia of the SMA, introducing the current design with the national emblem and two stars on 17 October 1994. In 1995 he began the Council of Command Sergeants Major designed to discuss improvements in NCO professional development. During his time as SMA, the tenure was permanently extended to four years. He retired on 16 June 1995 at Fort Myer.

== Awards and decorations ==
Combat Infantryman Badge
Master Parachutist Badge
Special Forces Tab
Army Staff Identification Badge
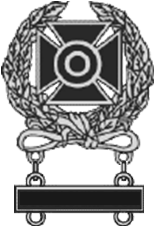
Expert Marksmanship Badge
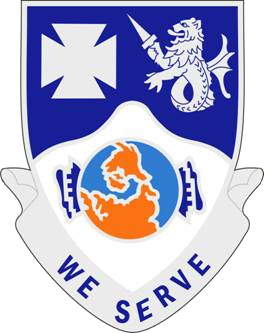
23rd Infantry Regiment Distinctive Unit Insignia

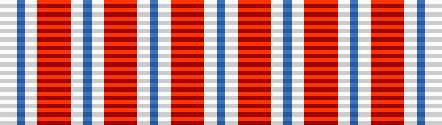
Distinguished Service Medal with oak leaf cluster
Defense Superior Service Medal
Legion of Merit with oak leaf cluster
Bronze Star Medal
Meritorious Service Medal with two oak leaf clusters
Air Medal
Army Commendation Medal with oak leaf cluster
Meritorious Unit Commendation
Department of the Army Outstanding Civilian Service Award
Army Good Conduct Medal with 1 gold Good Conduct Loops
National Defense Service Medal with service star
Vietnam Service Medal with four campaign stars
NCO Professional Development with award numeral 4
Army Service Ribbon
Overseas Service Ribbon with award numeral 4
Vietnam Gallantry Cross with bronze star
Republic of Vietnam Gallantry Cross Unit Citation
Vietnam Campaign Medal

- 11 Service stripes.

Since military retirement, Kidd continues to serve the military community and has received numerous awards including the Outstanding Civilian Service Award, the 2005 Sergeant Major of the Army William G. Bainbridge Medal and in 2006 he received the Doughboy Award for his outstanding contributions to the United States Army Infantry.

== Retirement ==
In 2007, Kidd was vice president, GEICO Field Representative Sales Management/Military Department. In 2010 Kidd retired from GEICO and lives in Colorado.

Military offices
Preceded by Julius W. Gates	Sergeant Major of the Army; 1991—1995	Succeeded by Gene C. McKinney
