= Robert E. Hall (soldier) =

Eleventh Sergeant Major of the US Army

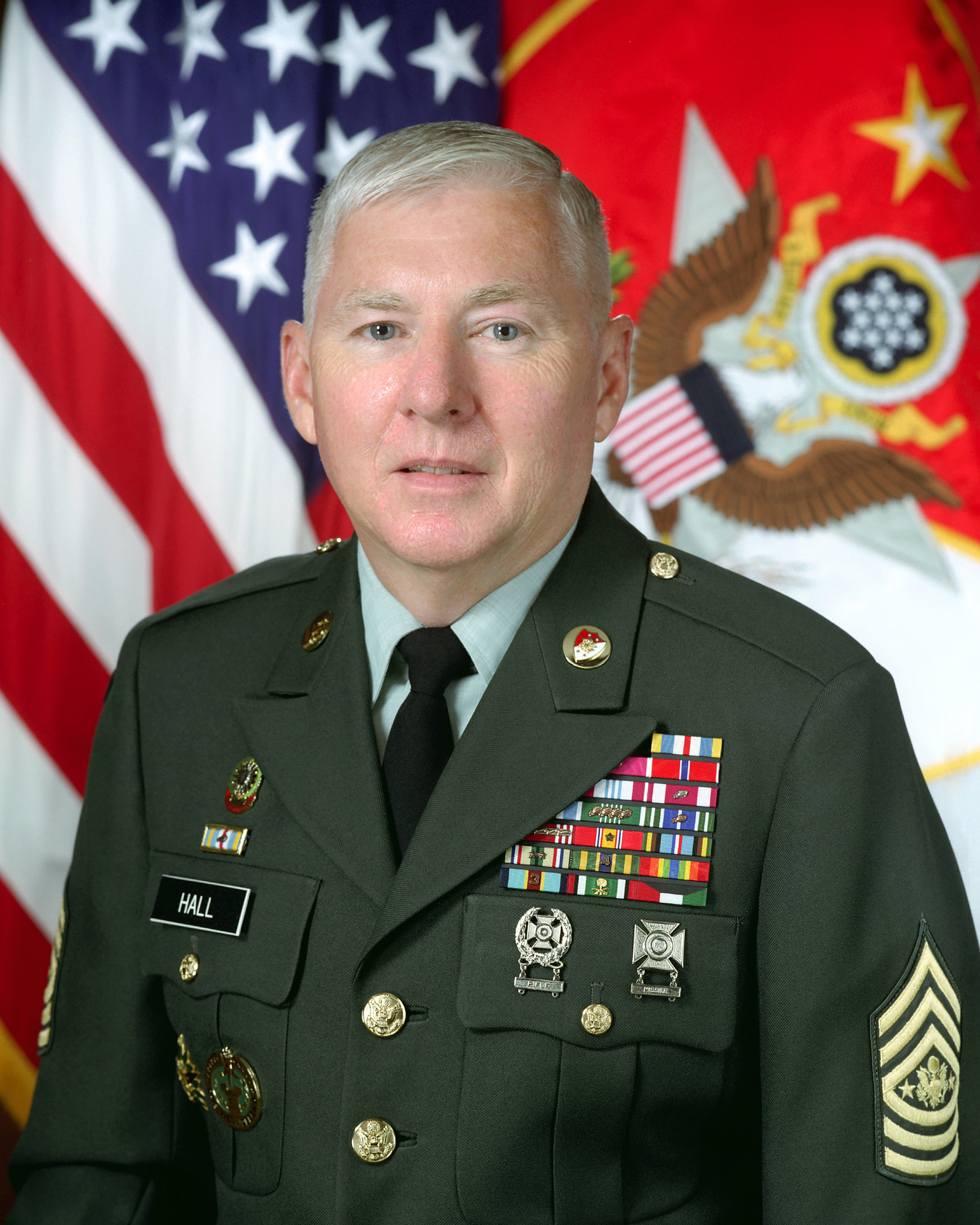
- SMA Robert E. Hall
- Born: May 31, 1947 (age 79); Gaffney, South Carolina, U.S.
- Military career
- Allegiance: United States
- Branch: United States Army
- Service years: 1968–2000
- Rank: Sergeant Major of the Army
- Conflicts: Gulf War
- Awards: Defense Distinguished Service Medal; Army Distinguished Service Medal; Defense Superior Service Medal; Legion of Merit (2); Bronze Star Medal

Robert E. Hall (born May 31, 1947) is a retired United States Army soldier who served as the eleventh Sergeant Major of the Army (SMA) from October 24, 1997, to June 23, 2000.

== Early life and education ==
Hall was born in Gaffney, South Carolina, on May 31, 1947. His father was a World War II veteran with a Silver Star and Purple Heart. He attended Limestone College in Gaffney before joining the army.

He holds a Bachelor of Arts degree in management from Park College in Parkville, Missouri.

== Military career ==
Hall entered the United States Army in February 1968 and attended Basic Training at Fort Bragg, North Carolina, and Advanced Individual Training at Fort Bliss, Texas as an Air Defense Artilleryman. He was trained on the Nike-Hercules missile system.

Hall was first stationed at Fort Story, Virginia he quickly rose to sergeant. He was sent to Fort Bliss to an NCO course and then the 8th Bn., 61st Air Defense Artillery Regt. who were transitioning to the Chaparral missile system and trained for six months at White Sands Missile Range in New Mexico.

In 1971, Hall and the 61st ADA were sent to South Korea to join the 2nd Infantry Division where he was promoted to staff sergeant. In 1972, he would return to Fort Bliss and the Air Defense Artillery School. He attended the Advanced NCO Course in 1974. After graduating, Hall was assigned to the 2nd Bn., 59th Air Defense Artillery Regt., 1st Armored Division as a platoon sergeant. He was moved to battalion operations sergeant and became 1st AD NCO of the Year in 1975. He was also made a member of the Sergeant Morales Club.

Hall again returned to Fort Bliss and was sent to Drill Sergeant School at Fort Sill, Oklahoma in 1977. After graduation he was to return to Bliss and the 4th Training Brigade. In 1979 he was the Fort Bliss Drill Sergeant of the Year and was named the top drill sergeant in TRADOC. This sent him to Fort Monroe and TRADOC headquarters. Hall took the First Sergeant Course during his time at TRADOC and was promoted to E-8.

Hall returned to the 2nd Bn., 59th Air Defense Artillery Regt., 1st Armored Division in Germany where he was sent to the Sergeants Major Academy back at Fort Bliss. After completing the course, he stayed on as an instructor for a year. He was then selected as the command sergeant major of 5th Bn., 52nd Air Defense Artillery Regt. In 1989 he became the 24th Infantry Division's NCO Academy. In 1991, he volunteered to take the advanced group to Saudi Arabia. After the division arrived, he set up Victory Station for new arrivals and replacements.

Hall would then become the 24th Division Artillery CSM, then the 2nd Infantry Division CSM in Korea, First Army CSM at Fort Meade, before becoming the CENTCOM CSM in 1994. He became the Sergeant Major of the Army on 24 October 1997.

As the SMA, Hall published his e-mail address in Soldiers magazine and usually had a laptop computer with him to be able to communicate with soldiers of all ranks. He helped develop and add to basic combat training the seven Army Core Values: Loyalty, Duty, Respect, Selfless Service, Honor, Integrity and Personal Courage. During his tenure the army struggled with recruiting and retention. He discarded the long time slogan "Be All You Can Be and replaced it with "An Army of One." He reported to Congress that soldiers had four essential complaints: pay, housing, medical care and retirement benefits. Hall was also the first SMA to have his own positional colors or flag starting in 1999. He retired 22 June 2000 at Fort Myer.

== Personal life ==
In retirement, Hall continues to serve the military community and has received numerous awards to include the Outstanding Civilian Service Award. In 2007, he was presented the Doughboy Award for his outstanding contributions to the US Army Infantry.

== Awards and decorations ==
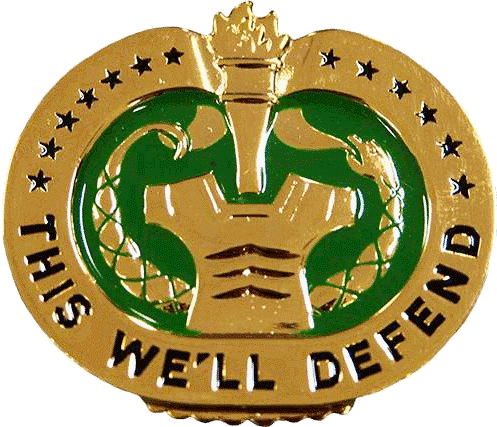
Drill Sergeant Identification Badge
Army Staff Identification Badge
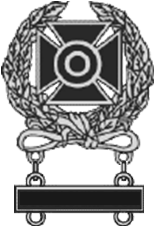
Expert Marksmanship Badge for rifle
Sharpshooter Marksmanship Badge for missile
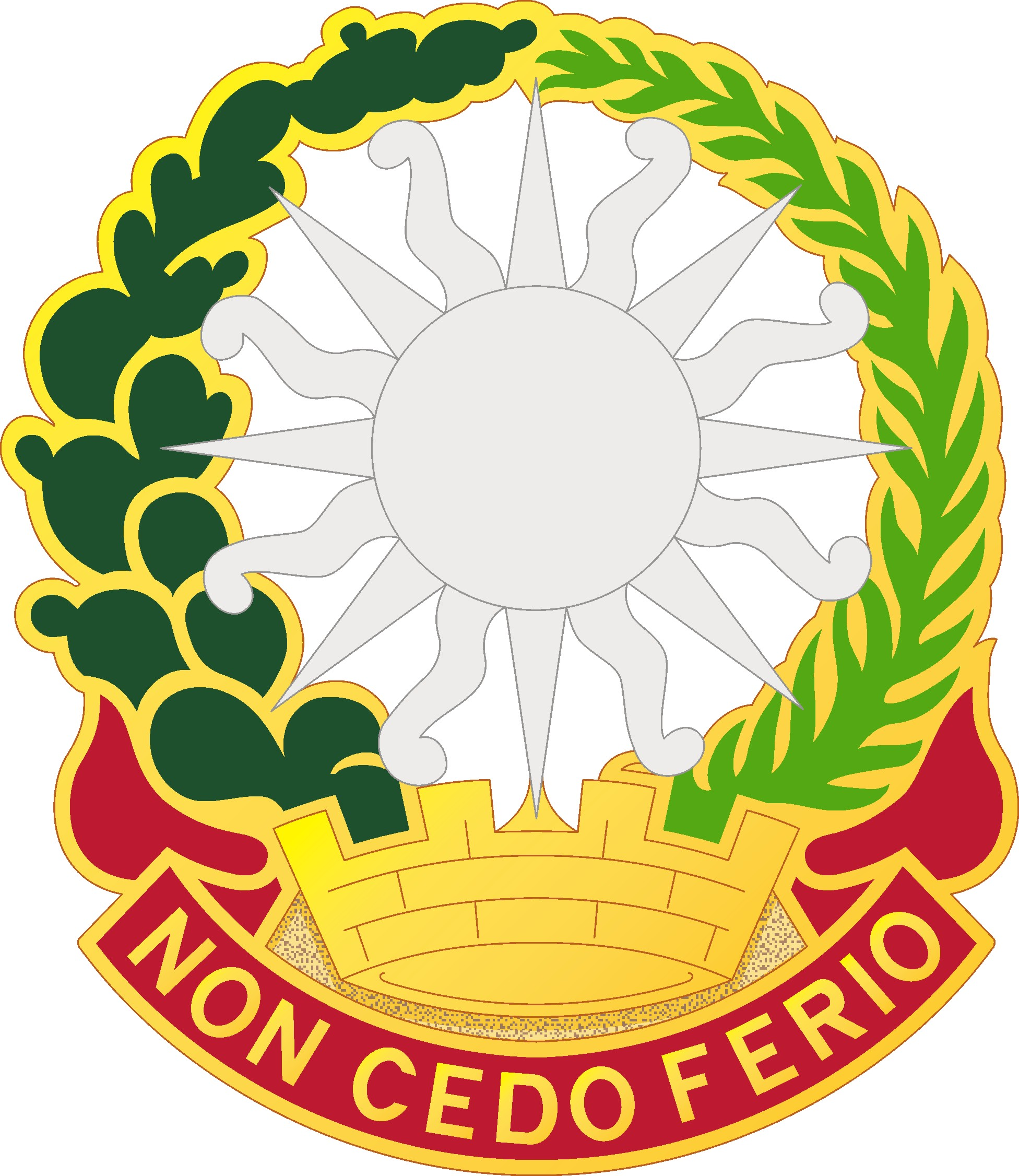
3rd Air Defense Artillery Regiment Distinctive Unit Insignia

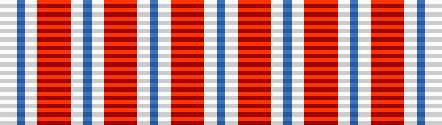
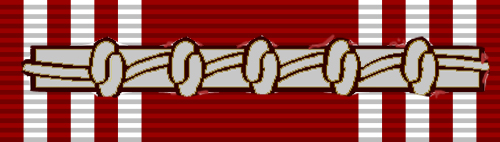
Defense Distinguished Service Medal
Army Distinguished Service Medal
Defense Superior Service Medal
Legion of Merit with one bronze oak leaf cluster
Bronze Star Medal
Defense Meritorious Service Medal
Meritorious Service Medal with five oak leaf clusters
Joint Service Commendation Medal
Army Commendation Medal with four oak leaf clusters
Army Achievement Medal with oak leaf cluster
Joint Meritorious Unit Award with oak leaf cluster
Department of the Army Outstanding Civilian Service Award
Good Conduct Medal, ten awards
National Defense Service Medal with service star
Armed Forces Expeditionary Medal
Southwest Asia Service Medal with two service stars
NCO Professional Development with award numeral 4
Army Service Ribbon
Overseas Service Ribbon with award numeral 3
Kuwait Liberation Medal (Saudi Arabia)
Kuwait Liberation Medal (Kuwait)

- 10 Service stripes.

Military offices
Preceded by Gene C. McKinney	Sergeant Major of the Army; 1997—2000	Succeeded by Jack L. Tilley
