= Raymond F. Chandler =

14th Sergeant Major of the US Army Commander (born 1962)

Raymond F. Chandler III
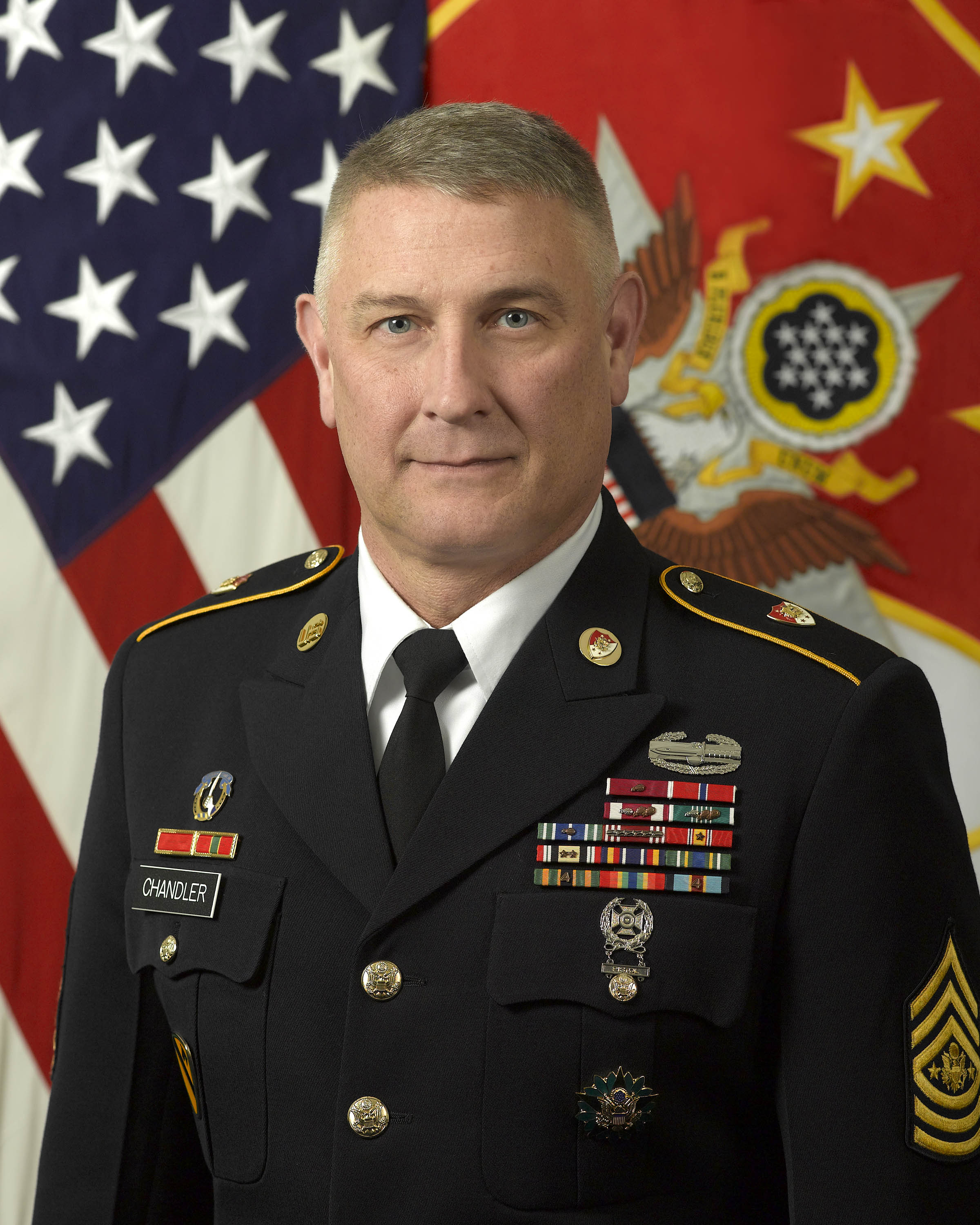
- Chandler in March 2019
- Born: August 25, 1962 (age 64); Whittier, California, United States
- Military career
- Allegiance: United States
- Branch: United States Army
- Service years: 1986-2015
- Rank: Sergeant Major of the Army
- Nickname: Ray
- Commands: United States Army Sergeant Major Academy
- Conflicts: Operation Inherent Resolve; Iraq War
- Awards: Army Distinguished Service Medal; Defense Superior Service Medal; Legion of Merit (2); Bronze Star Medal; Meritorious Service Medal (8); Army Commendation Medal (8); Army Achievement Medal (2)

Raymond F. Chandler III (born August 25, 1962) is a former United States Army soldier who served as the 14th Sergeant Major of the Army. He was sworn in on March 1, 2011. Chandler served in all tank crewman positions and has had multiple tours as a troop, squadron and regimental master gunner. He has served in the 1st Infantry Division (FWD), 2nd Infantry Division, 4th Infantry Division, 1st Cavalry Division, 3rd Armored Division, 2nd Armored Cavalry Regiment, 3rd Armored Cavalry Regiment, United States Army Armor School, and the United States Army Sergeants Major Academy. He also served as first sergeant in four different detachments, troops and companies. As a sergeant major, he served as Operations SGM in 1/2 ACR and as CSM in 1/7 Cavalry, 1st Cavalry Division, United States Army Garrison Fort Leavenworth, Kansas and the United States Army Armor School CSM. Chandler was assigned as the United States Army Sergeants Major Academy CSM in December 2007. In June 2009, Chandler became the 19th Commandant of USASMA and the first enlisted commandant in USASMA history.

== Early life ==
Raymond Francis Chandler was born in Whittier, California was raised in Massachusetts. He entered the United States Army in Brockton, Massachusetts in September 1981. PVT Chandler attended United States Army One Station Unit Training at Fort Knox, Kentucky as a 19E Armor Crewman.

== Military career ==
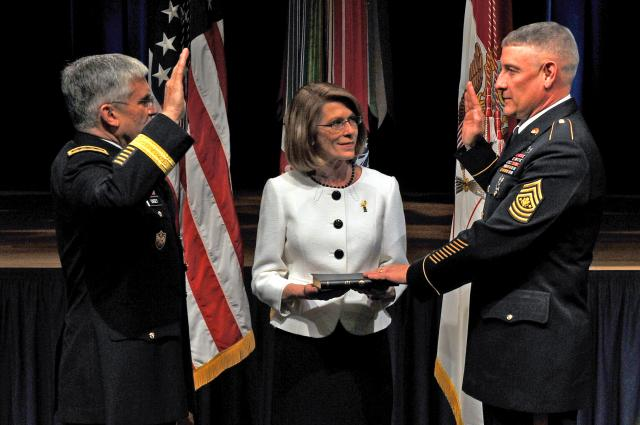
Chandler being sworn in as 14th Sergeant Major of the Army by General George Casey

Throughout his almost 35-year career, Chandler served in every enlisted leadership position from all tank crewman positions to his position as Sergeant Major of the Army. Other assignments he held as a sergeant major were Operations SGM in 1/2 ACR and as CSM in 1/7 Cavalry, 1st Cavalry Division; United States Army Garrison Fort Leavenworth, KS; and the United States Army Armor School CSM. Chandler was assigned as the United States Army Sergeants Major Academy CSM in December 2007. He deployed once with 1st Squadron, 7th Cavalry Regiment, 1st Cavalry Division to Iraq in 2004.

Chandler became the 14th Sergeant Major of the Army on March 1, 2011. As Sergeant Major of the Army, Chandler served as the Chief of Staff of the United States Army's personal adviser on all enlisted-related matters, particularly in areas affecting soldier training and quality of life, including the adoption of the new Army Service Uniform. The Sergeant Major of the Army is routinely invited to testify before U.S. Congress. He was succeeded by Daniel A. Dailey on January 30, 2015.

== Post-military career ==
In February 2015, Chandler was appointed by Senator Jack Reed (D-RI) to serve on the National Commission on the Future of the Army (http://www.ncfa.ncr.gov/) as a commissioner. The commission submitted its report to President Obama and to the 114th Congress on January 28, 2016.

Chandler serves on several boards and councils in support of Military and Veterans services.

== Education ==
Chandler's military education includes Noncommissioned Officer Education System, M60A4 and M1/M1A1 Tank Master Gunner Course, Battle Staff NCO Course, First Sergeant Course, Basic Instructor Training, Total Army Instructor Trainer Course, Small Group Instructor Trainer Course, Video Tele-Training Instructor Trainer Course, Army Management Staff Course, Garrison Command Sergeant Major Course and various other professional development courses. His civilian education includes a Bachelor of Science degree in public administration from Upper Iowa University.

== Awards and decorations ==
Combat Action Badge
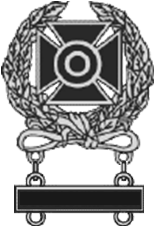
Expert Marksmanship Badge with Pistol bar
Army Staff Identification Badge
7th Cavalry Regiment Distinctive Unit Insignia
1st Cavalry Division Combat Service Identification Badge
2 Overseas Service Bars
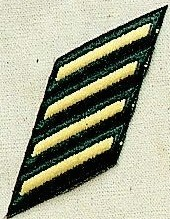
11 Service stripes

Army Distinguished Service Medal
Defense Superior Service Medal
Legion of Merit with one oak leaf cluster
Bronze Star Medal
Meritorious Service Medal with one silver and two bronze oak leaf clusters
Army Commendation Medal with one silver and two bronze oak leaf clusters
Army Achievement Medal with oak leaf cluster
Meritorious Unit Commendation
Superior Unit Award
Army Good Conduct Medal 11 awards
National Defense Service Medal with one service star
Iraq Campaign Medal with two service stars
Global War on Terrorism Expeditionary Medal
Global War on Terrorism Service Medal
Korea Defense Service Medal
NCO Professional Development Ribbon with bronze award numeral 4
Army Service Ribbon
Army Overseas Service Ribbon with award numeral 4

Chandler is a recipient of the Order of Saint George (Bronze Medallion), the Distinguished Order of Saint Martin and the Honorable Order of Saint Barbara.

Military offices
Preceded by Kenneth O. Preston	Sergeant Major of the Army; 2011–2015	Succeeded by Daniel A. Dailey
