= Gene McKinney =

10th Sergeant Major of the US Army

Gene C. McKinney
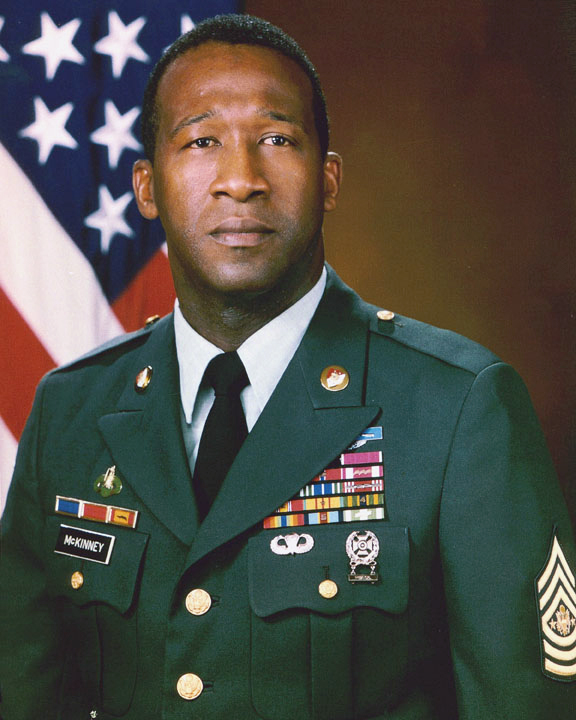
- Master Sergeant (MSG) Formerly the Sergeant Major of the Army Gene McKinney in the 1990s
- Born: November 3, 1950 (age 75); Monticello, Florida, United States
- Military career
- Allegiance: United States
- Branch: United States Army
- Service years: 1968–1998
- Rank: Master Sergeant
- Conflicts: Vietnam War
- Awards: Legion of Merit; Bronze Star Medal (2); Meritorious Service Medal (4)

Gene C. McKinney (born November 3, 1950) is a retired United States Army soldier who served as the 10th Sergeant Major of the Army (SMA), serving from June 1995 to October 1997. He was the first African American to reach that rank in the United States Army. In 1998, he was court-martialed on charges including sexual harassment and obstruction of justice. He was convicted of obstruction of justice and demoted to the rank of master sergeant.

== Early life and education ==
McKinney was born in Monticello, Florida, on November 3, 1950. He is one of six siblings, all of whom served in the United States Army. One served as an officer; one retired as a master sergeant; another served in the Vietnam War; and an identical twin, James C. McKinney, was a command sergeant major.

== Military career ==
McKinney enlisted in the United States Army in August 1968, and completed Basic Training as a Cavalryman at Fort Knox, Kentucky. He next went to Airborne and Parachute Riggers course.

From 1969 to 1970, he saw combat in the Vietnam War with the 2nd Bn., 503rd Infantry Regt., 173rd Airborne Brigade. He left Vietnam as a sergeant and was sent back to Fort Bragg as a parachute rigger in the 612th Quartermaster Bn. When his enlistment was over, he left the army to attend college, but quickly decided to return.

McKinney was assigned to 1st Bn., 58th Infantry Regt. at Fort Benning, Georgia. He would go on to the Basic NCO Course at Fort Knox, Kentucky in 1973. Now a staff sergeant, he was assigned to 3rd Squadron, 12th Cavalry Regt. at Büdingen, Germany. He would head up the squadron sports teams there.

In 1977, McKinney was transferred to Fort Bliss and the 3rd Squadron, 3rd Armored Cavalry Regt. (ACR). In 1983 he was sent to Troop G, 2nd Squadron, 2nd Armored Cavalry Regt. in Bamberg, Germany where he was elevated from platoon sergeant to first sergeant. He also was given medical NCOs to turn into cavalry scout NCOs due to the army draw down.

In 1984, McKinney was sent to Fort Bliss as the operations sergeant of the 3rd Armored Cavalry Regt. and later as a troop first sergeant. Before he left he was a squadron sergeant major and addended the Sergeants Major Academy. He would return to Bamberg and 2nd ACR as a squadron command sergeant major (CSM) in 1988. From 1990 to 1995 he would become the CSM of a brigade in the 1st Armored Division, 8th Infantry Divisional CSM and US Army Europe CSM.

McKinney became the Sergeant Major of the Army 30 June 1995. As the SMA, he lobbied for and got the army to create a graduated system of pay for Command Sergeants Majors (CSM). He felt that a CSM of a division should be paid more than the CSM of a brigade or a battalion. He would also participate in Secretary of the Army Togo D. West's Task Force on Extremist Activities.

=== Sexual harassment allegations and dismissal ===
In the fall of 1996, allegations of sexual misconduct by training cadre at Aberdeen Proving Ground and several other United States Army postings surfaced, and the Army instituted a substantial investigation with a toll-free telephone hotline that received nearly 60,000 calls within a matter of weeks. The task force established by Secretary of the Army, Togo D. West, Jr., to advise him about the situation included McKinney as the spokesman of the Army enlisted soldiers. In February 1997, McKinney was himself accused by a female former subordinate of improper advances. The Army suspended him from his duties that month while the charges were investigated; in May–October of that year, two command sergeants major, one being McKinney's twin brother, James C. McKinney; the other Jerry T. Alley—took over his duties in rotation. While McKinney was suspended from his duties as Sergeant Major of the Army, five more female soldiers accused him of similar improprieties. In November 1997, the Article 32 investigating panel (U.S. military counterpart to a grand jury) completed its investigation and recommended charges for a court-martial. McKinney was thereupon permanently reassigned out of his billet and laterally redesignated to the rank of command sergeant major; his successor, Robert E. Hall, was promptly installed.

McKinney was acquitted of all sexual harassment charges, but was convicted of obstruction of justice and received a reduction in grade to master sergeant and a reprimand. Though he retired as a master sergeant, his retirement pay was calculated using the pay rate he earned during his tenure as Sergeant Major of the Army, in accordance with 10 USC § 1406(i)(1). That law was subsequently amended by 10 USC § 1406(i)(2)(A) to prevent a recurrence.

== Felony vehicular charge ==
On October 25, 2010, McKinney allegedly hit a man with his car on purpose, and was charged with felony malicious wounding. This occurred following an incident in which McKinney drove erratically after picking up two slug passengers in Occoquan, Virginia. When the passengers exited the car, one of them attempted to take a photograph of McKinney's license plate, and claimed that McKinney drove his car into him.

Based on the preliminary hearing in April 2011, a judge ruled that the evidence in the case was sufficient to proceed to trial. McKinney was indicted for malicious wounding (a felony) and reckless driving (a misdemeanor).

McKinney submitted an Alford plea, which the court accepted. As a part of his plea agreement the felony charge was reduced to disorderly conduct. He was also sentenced to twelve months of incarceration, of which the judge suspended all but 10 days. McKinney was given credit for time served and only had to serve an additional two days.

== Awards and decorations ==
Combat Infantryman Badge
Basic Parachutist Badge
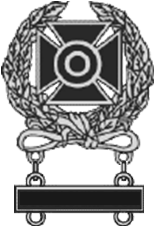
Expert Marksmanship Badge
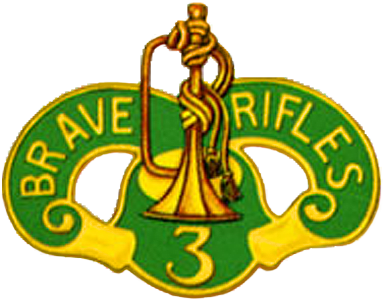
3rd Armored Cavalry Regiment Distinctive Unit Insignia

Legion of Merit
Bronze Star Medal with oak leaf cluster
Meritorious Service Medal with three oak leaf clusters
Army Commendation Medal
Army Achievement Medal
Presidential Unit Citation
Meritorious Unit Commendation
Good Conduct Medal (9 awards)
National Defense Service Medal with one service star
Vietnam Service Medal with one service star
NCO Professional Education Ribbon with award numeral 4
Army Service Ribbon
Overseas Service Ribbon with award numeral 5
Republic of Vietnam Gallantry Cross Unit Citation
Vietnam Campaign Medal

- 9 Service stripes.

Military offices
Preceded by Richard A. Kidd	Sergeant Major of the Army; 1995–1997	Succeeded by Robert E. Hall
