= Julius W. Gates =

Eighth Sergeant Major of the US Army

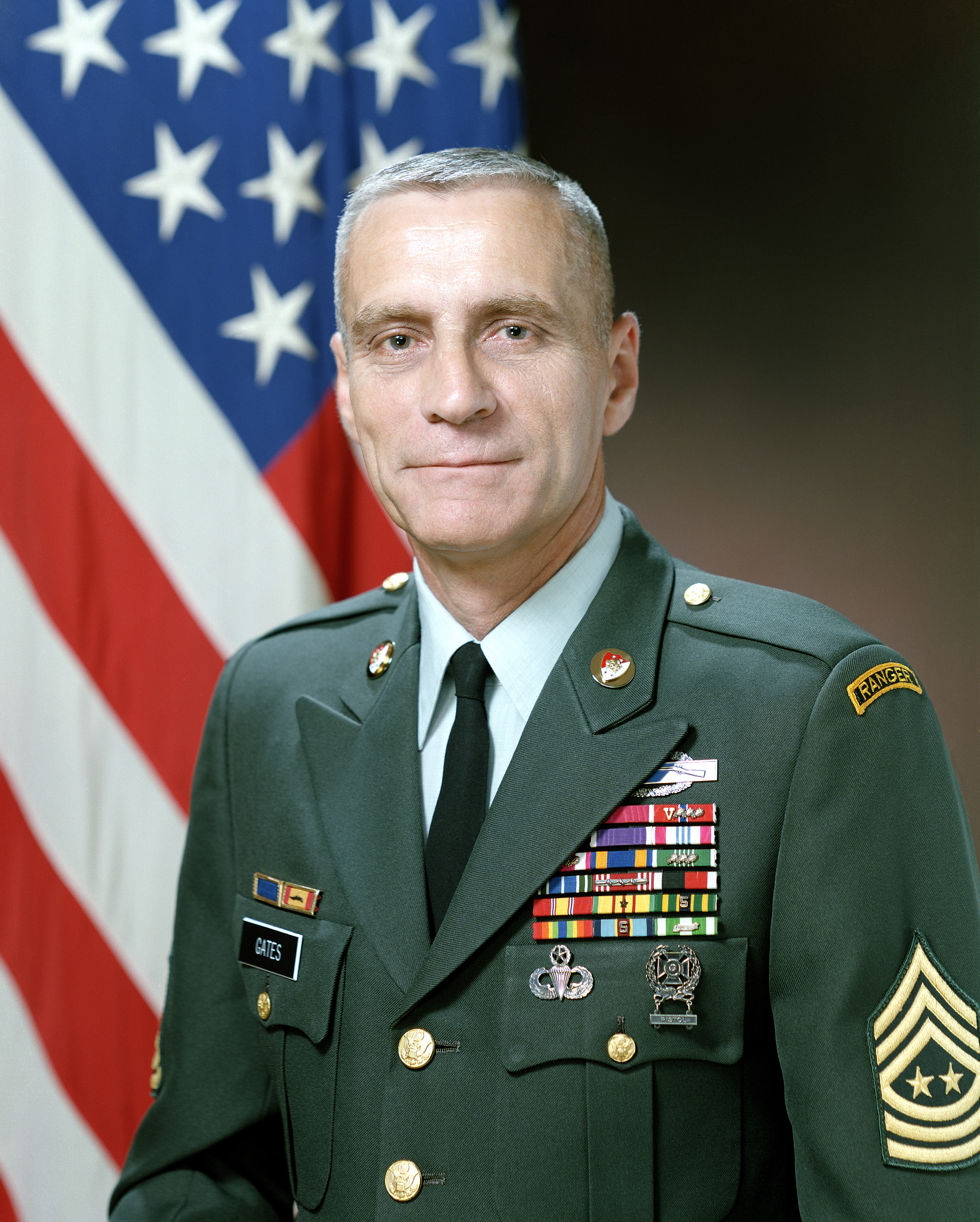
- Sergeant Major of the Army Julius W. Gates
- Born: June 14, 1941 (age 85); North Carolina, U.S.
- Military career
- Allegiance: United States
- Branch: United States Army
- Service years: 1958–1991
- Rank: Sergeant Major of the Army
- Nickname: Bill
- Conflicts: Vietnam War
- Awards: Army Distinguished Service Medal; Defense Superior Service Medal; Legion of Merit; Bronze Star Medal (4); Purple Heart

Julius William Gates (born June 14, 1941) is a retired United States Army soldier who served as the eighth Sergeant Major of the Army. He was sworn in at the Pentagon in July 1987 and served until his term ended four years later in June 1991.

== Early life ==
Gates was born in North Carolina on June 14, 1941 and raised on a farm northwest of Carrboro, North Carolina.

== Military career ==
Gates enlisted in the United States Army at the height of the Cold War on 12 August 1958, and attended initial training and infantry training at Fort Jackson, South Carolina. First assignment was to the 3d Battle Group, 6th Infantry Division, in the still divided Berlin in 1959 which included guard duty at Spandau Prison. While there he was promoted to Specialist 4th Class and attended the NCO academy, where he was the honor graduate. He also completed his GED. He left the army after his 3-year enlistment ended.

He rejoined the army the same year he left and volunteered for the airborne and was sent to Fort Campbell, Kentucky and the 3d Battle Group, 187th Infantry Regt., 101st Airborne Division. As a member of the 101st Airborne Division, he and his unit were called on by President John F. Kennedy to enforce racial integration at the University of Mississippi. While at Fort Campbell, he attended Jumpmaster School, Pathfinder School and CBR School as well as the Ranger course where he was the top graduate.

In 1966 he would be sent to Vietnam with Company B, 2d Bn. (Airborne), 502d Infantry Regt., 101st Airborne Division where he was a squad leader doing search and destroy missions. There Gates would be promoted to staff sergeant. He was also wounded during an assault on his base camp.

He returned to Fort Benning in 1967 as a sergeant first class and a Ranger instructor. He also attended the British Army Tactics School. In 1969, Gates was sent back to Vietnam with Company K, 75th Infantry, the Ranger element of the 4th Infantry Division. He served in several roles including operations sergeant and first sergeant.

Upon returning from Vietnam, in 1970, Gates was sent to Germany and the 2nd Bn., 54th Infantry Regt., 4th Armored Division as the S-2 Intelligence sergeant in place of an officer. Returning from Germany in 1973, he was sent to the Mountain Ranger Camp in Dohlonega, Georgia as a chief instructor. In 1974 he was promoted to master sergeant and sent to the 3rd Ranger Co. at Fort Benning. He then attended the Sergeants Major Academy and the Community College of El Paso, earning his associates degree in 1977.

In 1977 he organized the 24th Infantry Division's NCO academy. In 1978, Gates was promoted to sergeant major and assigned to the Army Reserve Officer Training Corps (ROTC) staff at the Virginia Military Institute (VMI). In 1980, he was sent back to Germany and the 2nd Bn. (Mechanized), 50th Infantry Regt., 2nd Armored Division (Forward), in Garlstedt, Germany. He moved to Würzburg as the 3rd Infantry Division's Command Sergeant Major (CSM). In 1984, he returned from Germany to the Sergeants Major Academy as it's CSM. He would next go to Korea as the Eighth Army CSM in 1985 where he worked to improve the conditions for the troops, which were often austere.

Gates became SMA on 1 July 1987. He spearheaded designating 1989 the “Year of the Noncommissioned Officer" as well as leading to the creation of the NCO Journal. He visited Panama during Operation Just Cause and Saudi Arabia during Desert Shield/Desert Storm. He was also active on the uniform board - asking for and getting more than 150 changes to the uniform. He retired on 30 June 1991.

=== Awards and decorations ===
Combat Infantryman Badge
Ranger tab
Master Parachutist Badge
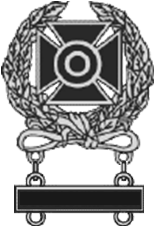
Expert Marksman Badge with one weapon clasp

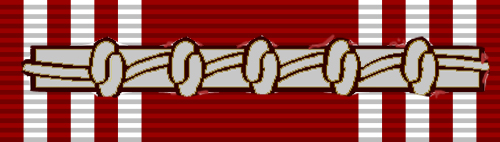
Army Distinguished Service Medal
Defense Superior Service Medal
Legion of Merit
Bronze Star Medal with Valor device and three oak leaf clusters
Purple Heart
Defense Meritorious Service Medal
Meritorious Service Medal with three oak leaf clusters
Air Medal
Army Commendation Medal with three oak leaf clusters
Army Achievement Medal
Presidential Unit Citation
Good Conduct Medal with 5 silver loops
Army of Occupation Medal
National Defense Service Medal with bronze service star
Vietnam Service Medal with service star
NCO Professional Development with award numeral 5
Army Service Ribbon
Overseas Service Ribbon with award numeral 5
Republic of Vietnam Gallantry Cross Unit Citation
Vietnam Campaign Medal

- 10 Service stripes.

2005 recipient of the Doughboy Award from the National Infantry Association.

Military offices
Preceded by Glen E. Morrell	Sergeant Major of the Army; 1987—1991	Succeeded by Richard A. Kidd
