= Sergeant Major of the Army =

Senior enlisted member of the U.S. Army

United States Sergeant Major of the Army
- Sergeant Major of the Army left collar brass insignia

- Flag of the SMA

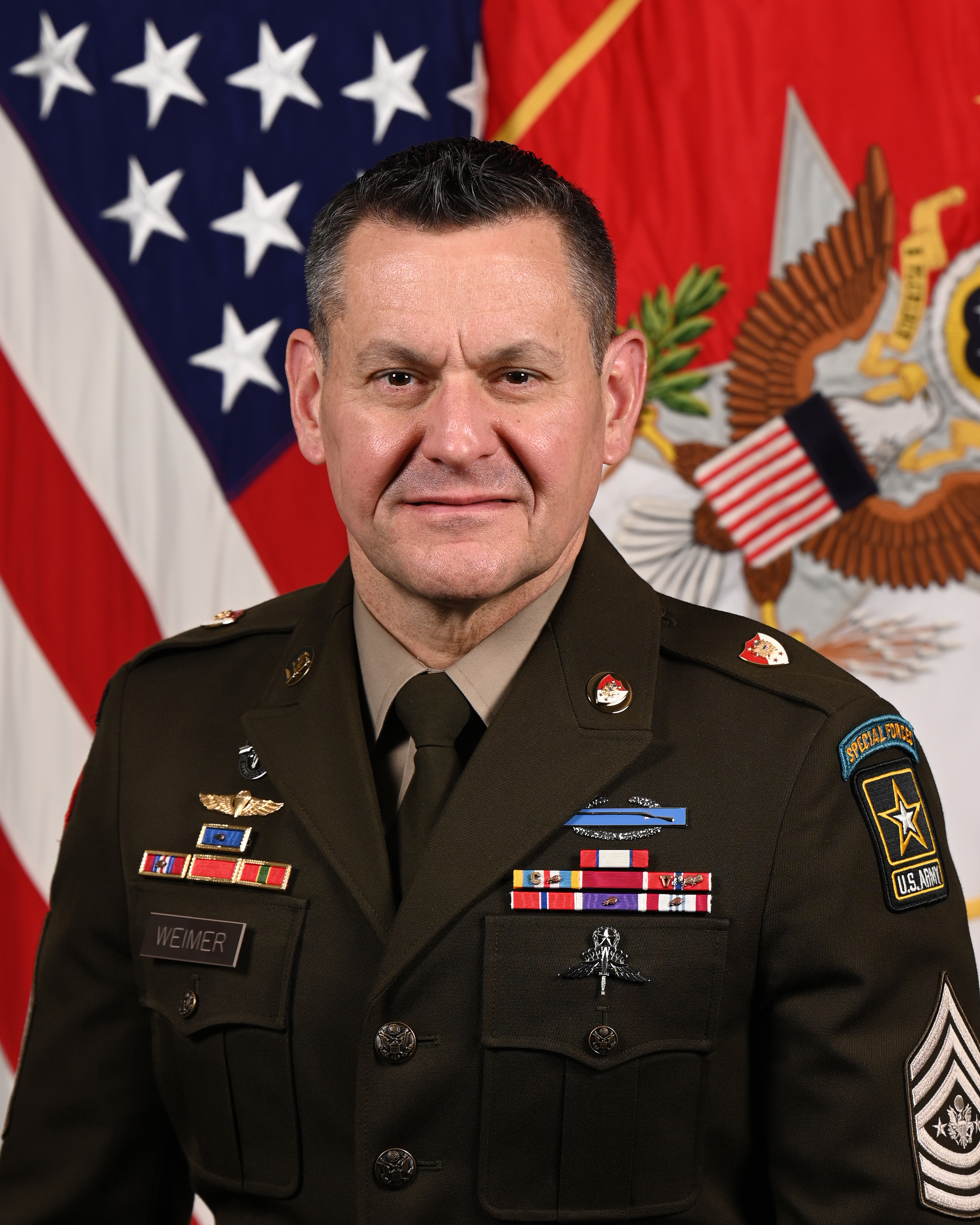
- Incumbent; Michael R. Weimer since 4 August 2023
- United States Army
- Abbreviation: SMA
- Reports to: Chief of Staff of the U.S. Army
- Formation: 11 July 1966; 60 years ago
- First holder: William O. Wooldridge
- Salary: $10,758.00 per month, regardless of the incumbent's service longevity
- Website: Official website

The sergeant major of the Army (SMA) is a unique non-commissioned rank and position of office in the United States Army. The holder of this rank and position is the most senior enlisted soldier in the Army, unless an enlisted soldier is serving as the senior enlisted advisor to the chairman. The SMA is appointed to serve as a spokesman to address the issues of enlisted soldiers to all officers, from warrant officers and lieutenants to the Army's highest positions. As such, they are the senior enlisted advisor to the chief of staff of the Army. The exact duties vary depending on the chief of staff, though much of the SMA's time is spent traveling throughout the Army, observing training and talking with soldiers and their families.

Kenneth O. Preston held the rank from 15 January 2004 through 28 February 2011, the only incumbent to serve longer than five years. SMA Michael R. Weimer has held the office since 4 August 2023.

The SMA is designated a special paygrade above E-9. While the SMA is a non-commissioned officer, protocol places the SMA higher than all lieutenant generals (except for the Director of the Army Staff) and equivalent to a general for formal courtesies in addition to seating, billeting, transportation, and parking.

== History ==
The rank and position were based on those of the sergeant major of the Marine Corps (established in its current incarnation on 23 May 1957). The Chief of Staff of the Army created the position in 1966 after asking leaders of the major commands for a personal recommendation. He asked that it not be considered a near-retirement type assignment. He listed seven duties and functions he expected the Sergeant Major to perform, including service as a personal adviser and assistant on matters pertaining to enlisted soldiers. From 4,700 proposed candidates, 21 nominees were selected. Finally chosen was the only one then serving in Vietnam, Sergeant Major William O. Wooldridge of the 1st Infantry Division.

The other services later followed, creating the positions of Master Chief Petty Officer of the Navy and Chief Master Sergeant of the Air Force in 1967, Master Chief Petty Officer of the Coast Guard in 1969, Senior Enlisted Advisor to the Chairman in 2005, and Chief Master Sergeant of the Space Force in 2020. These seven positions are collectively referred to as "senior enlisted advisors" ("SEAs").

== Insignia ==
SMA insignia timeline

1966–1979 Goldenlite stripes for Army Green "Class A" service uniform

1979–1994 for Army Green "Class A" service uniform

1994–2015 for Army Green "Class A" service uniform

2010–present, green background replaced with dark blue for Army Blue Service Uniform (ASU)

2019–present, tan on olive for use on Army Green Service Uniform (AGSU) replaced the dark blue as the primary uniform.

The sergeant major of the Army, like counterparts in the other branches, wears a unique rank insignia, including a unique collar insignia ("brass").

The collar insignia of the SMA is the shield portion of the collar insignia of an aide-de-camp to the Army Chief of Staff (less the surmounting eagle), placed upon an enlisted collar disk of gold color, one inch in diameter. The insignia worn by the first Sergeant Major of the Army William O. Wooldridge was hand-soldered by Colonel Jasper J. Wilson from the cannibalized insignia and enlisted collar brass of an aide. The insignia was approved on 4 July 1966. Originally, the SMA would wear the device on each collar, but he now wears the standard "U.S." disk on his right collar as do all enlisted soldiers. This insignia is also worn in place of a unit insignia on the SMA's beret, garrison cap, and pull-over sweater. The collar insignia of the senior enlisted advisor to the chairman ("SEAC") of the JCS, approved 2 February 2006, is based directly upon that of the SMA, and features the shield of an aide de camp to the chairman of the joint chiefs of staff (without the surmounting eagle), on a gold-colored disk.

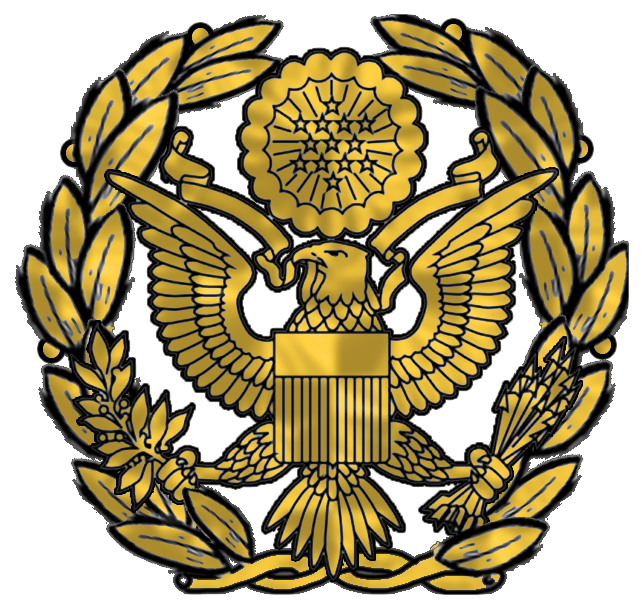
Sergeant Major of the Army Cap Insignia

The SMA's cap device, worn on the front of the blue service cap (and, formerly, the white service cap; and, until 2011 the green service cap) is a gold-colored rendering of the United States' coat of arms, surrounded by a wreath. The cap device for all other U.S. Army enlisted soldiers is a gold-colored rendering of the United States' coat of arms on a gold-colored disk (males) or surrounded by a gold colored ring (females). The chief master sergeant of the Air Force has the same cap device as the SMA, but in silver-colored metal.

== Positional color ==
The sergeant major of the Army, chief master sergeant of the Air Force, chief master sergeant of the Space Force, and the senior enlisted advisor to the chairman are the only members of the United States armed forces below the rank of brigadier general/rear admiral, lower half to be authorized a positional color (flag). First considered in 1992, the SMA's color has been authorized since 22 March 1999. It is based on the design of his collar insignia and the positional flag of the Chief of Staff, Army. Like the SEAC's collar brass, the SEAC's positional color was patterned after the SMA's color.

== List of sergeants major of the Army ==
No.	Portrait	SMA	Took office	Left office	Time in office	Chief of Staff
1	William O. Wooldridge	William O. Wooldridge (1922–2012)	11 July 1966	31 August 1968	2 years, 51 days	Harold K. Johnson; William Westmoreland
2	George W. Dunaway	George W. Dunaway (1922–2008)	1 September 1968	30 September 1970	2 years, 29 days	William Westmoreland
3	Silas L. Copeland	Silas L. Copeland (1920–2001)	1 October 1970	30 June 1973	2 years, 272 days	William Westmoreland; Creighton Abrams
4	Leon L. Van Autreve	Leon L. Van Autreve (1920–2002)	1 July 1973	30 June 1975	1 year, 364 days	Creighton Abrams; Frederick C. Weyand
5	William G. Bainbridge	William G. Bainbridge (1925–2008)	1 July 1975	30 June 1979	3 years, 364 days	Frederick C. Weyand; Bernard W. Rogers; Edward C. Meyer
6	William A. Connelly	William A. Connelly (1931–2019)	1 July 1979	30 June 1983	3 years, 364 days	Edward C. Meyer
7	Glen E. Morrell	Glen E. Morrell (1936–2023)	1 July 1983	30 June 1987	3 years, 364 days	John A. Wickham Jr. Carl E. Vuono
8	Julius W. Gates	Julius W. Gates (born 1941)	1 July 1987	30 June 1991	3 years, 364 days	Carl E. Vuono; Gordon R. Sullivan
9	Richard A. Kidd	Richard A. Kidd (born 1943)	1 July 1991	16 June 1995	3 years, 350 days	Gordon R. Sullivan
10	Gene C. McKinney	Gene C. McKinney (born 1950)	30 June 1995	13 October 1997	2 years, 105 days	Gordon R. Sullivan; Dennis Reimer
11	Robert E. Hall	Robert E. Hall (born 1947)	13 October 1997	23 June 2000	2 years, 266 days	Dennis Reimer; Eric Shinseki
12	Jack L. Tilley	Jack L. Tilley (born 1948)	23 June 2000	15 January 2004	3 years, 206 days	Eric Shinseki; Peter Schoomaker
13	Kenneth O. Preston	Kenneth O. Preston (born 1957)	15 January 2004	1 March 2011	7 years, 45 days	Peter Schoomaker; George W. Casey Jr.
14	Raymond F. Chandler	Raymond F. Chandler (born 1962)	1 March 2011	30 January 2015	3 years, 335 days	George W. Casey Jr. Martin Dempsey; Raymond T. Odierno
15	Daniel A. Dailey	Daniel A. Dailey (born 1969)	30 January 2015	9 August 2019	4 years, 191 days	Raymond T. Odierno; Mark A. Milley
16	Michael A. Grinston	Michael A. Grinston (born 1968)	9 August 2019	4 August 2023	3 years, 360 days	James C. McConville
17	Michael R. Weimer	Michael R. Weimer (born c. 1971)	4 August 2023	Incumbent	3 years, 105 days	Randy A. George

== See also ==
- Senior Enlisted Advisor to the Chairman of the Joint Chiefs of Staff
- Sergeant Major of the Marine Corps
- Master Chief Petty Officer of the Navy
- Chief Master Sergeant of the Air Force
- Chief Master Sergeant of the Space Force
- Master Chief Petty Officer of the Coast Guard
- Master Chief Petty Officer of the Coast Guard Reserve Force
- Senior Enlisted Advisor for the National Guard Bureau
- Army Staff Senior Warrant Officer
- Command Sergeant Major of the Army Reserve
