= Sergeant Morales Club =

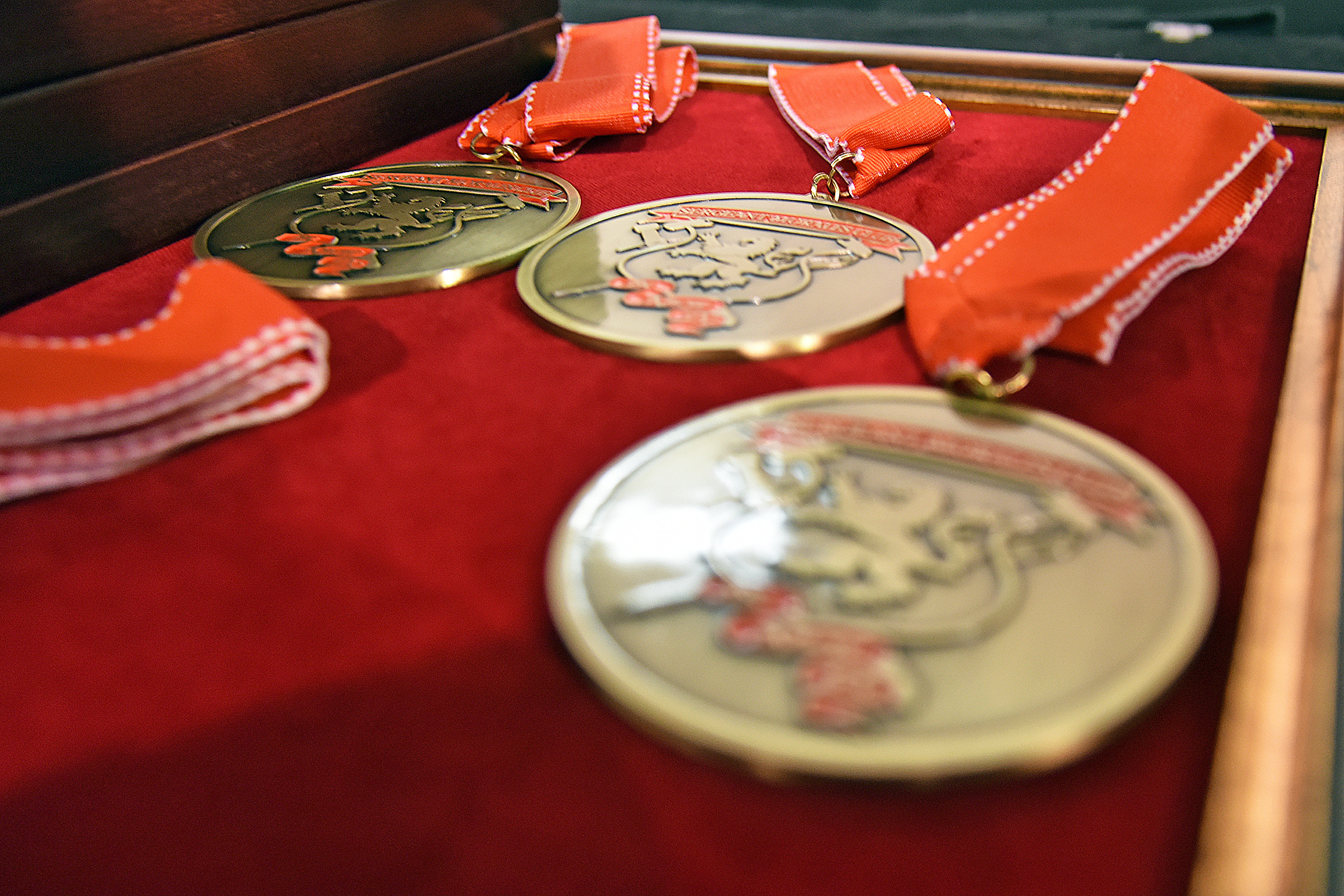
The medallions of the Sergeant Morales Club for five new inductees in 2019.)

The Sergeant Morales Club was established in 1973 by Lt. Gen. George S. Blanchard to promoted the ideals of integrity, professionalism and leadership among army non-commissioned officers serving in the U.S. Army Europe (USAREUR) and is similar to the Sergeant Audie Murphy Club.

In addition to meeting all the eligibility requirements, a candidate must go before a competitive board before final approval. Once inducted, new members are given a commemorative medallion. After induction, members are expected to participate in community support activities that support the USAREUR command.

Military communities throughout USAREUR have their own chapters of the Sergeant Morales Club named after the fictional NCO. The chapters are associated with the U.S. Army, but are entirely self-funded and led. They sponsor community service events as well as professional development for army NCOs. It is regulated by USAREUR under AEA REG 600-2.

== The Myth ==
General Blanchard created the "myth" of Sergeant Morales as an exemplification of an ideal army NCO.

The story is that Sergeant Morales was assigned to U.S. Army Europe after completing his high school education. He was quick to integrate into his new unit and not shy about working hard with his soldiers. He made sure his soldiers were up to date on their training. He knew the personal details of every one of his soldiers. He counseled them on their careers often explaining both their strengths and weaknesses. He made sure that every soldier in his squad wore their uniform with pride. And in all areas of soldiering, Morales led by example. By the time he left Europe he had completed a two-year college degree.

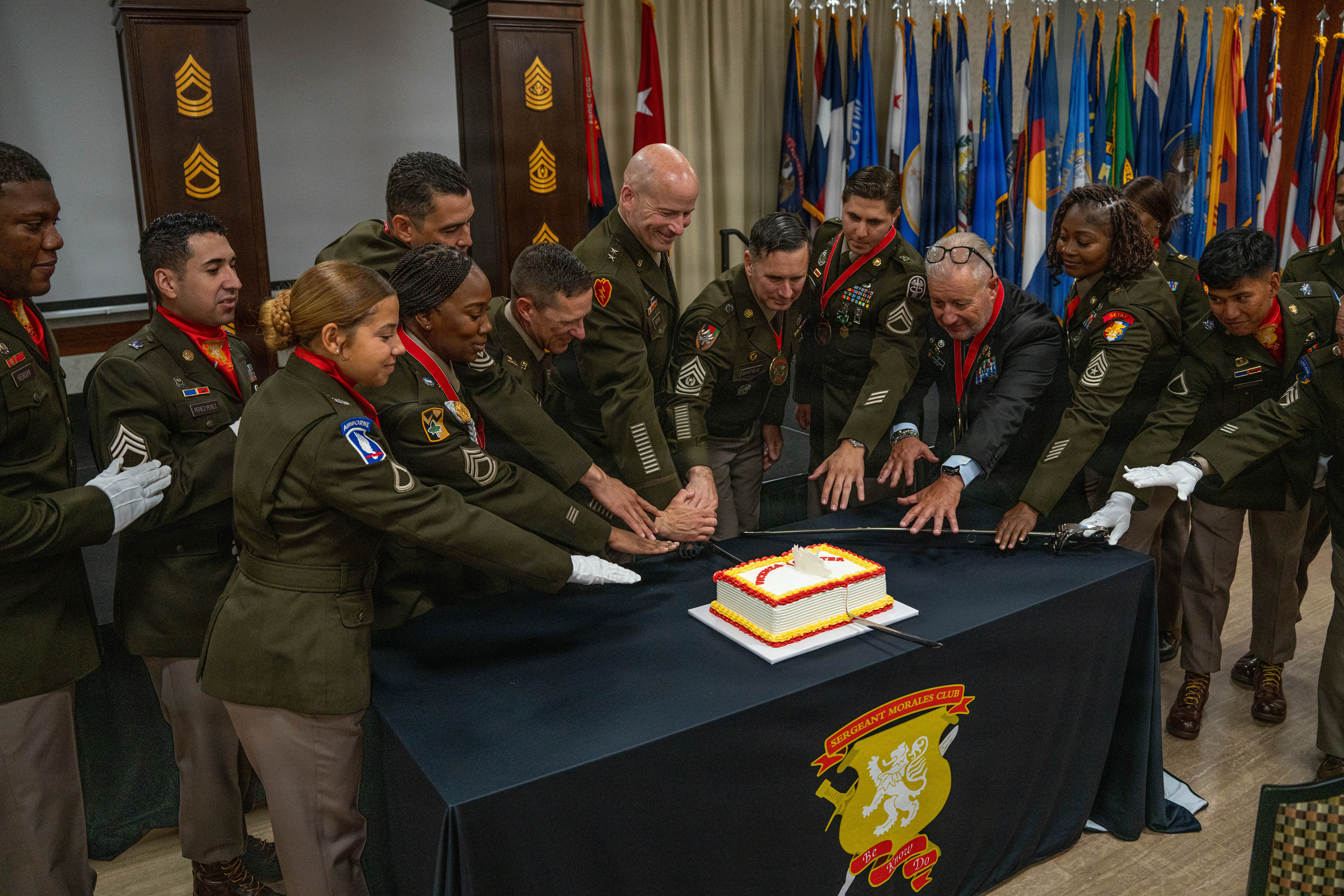
Sergeant Morales Club members and volunteers help cut the cake at the Sergeant Morales Induction Ceremony, July 10, 2026, on Caserma Ederle, Italy.

== Eligibility ==
- Must hold the rank of corporal through sergeant first class
- Must be assigned or attached to U.S. Army Europe or subordinate command
- Mentor at least two soldiers
- Share the values of professionalism in their unit
- Exercise sound leadership
- Display professional Army ethics
- Develop the seven Army Values
- Display a warrior ethos
- Display physical fitness and marksmanship

== Notable members ==
- Kenneth Preston (13th Sergeant Major of the Army)
- Robert E. Hall (11th Sergeant Major of the Army)

== See also ==
- Order of Saint Maurice (US Army Infantry)
- Order of Saint Barbara (US Army and USMC Artillery)
- Saint George Award (US Army Cavalry)
- Sergeant Audie Murphy Club (US Army NCOs)
