= United States Army Sergeants Major Academy =

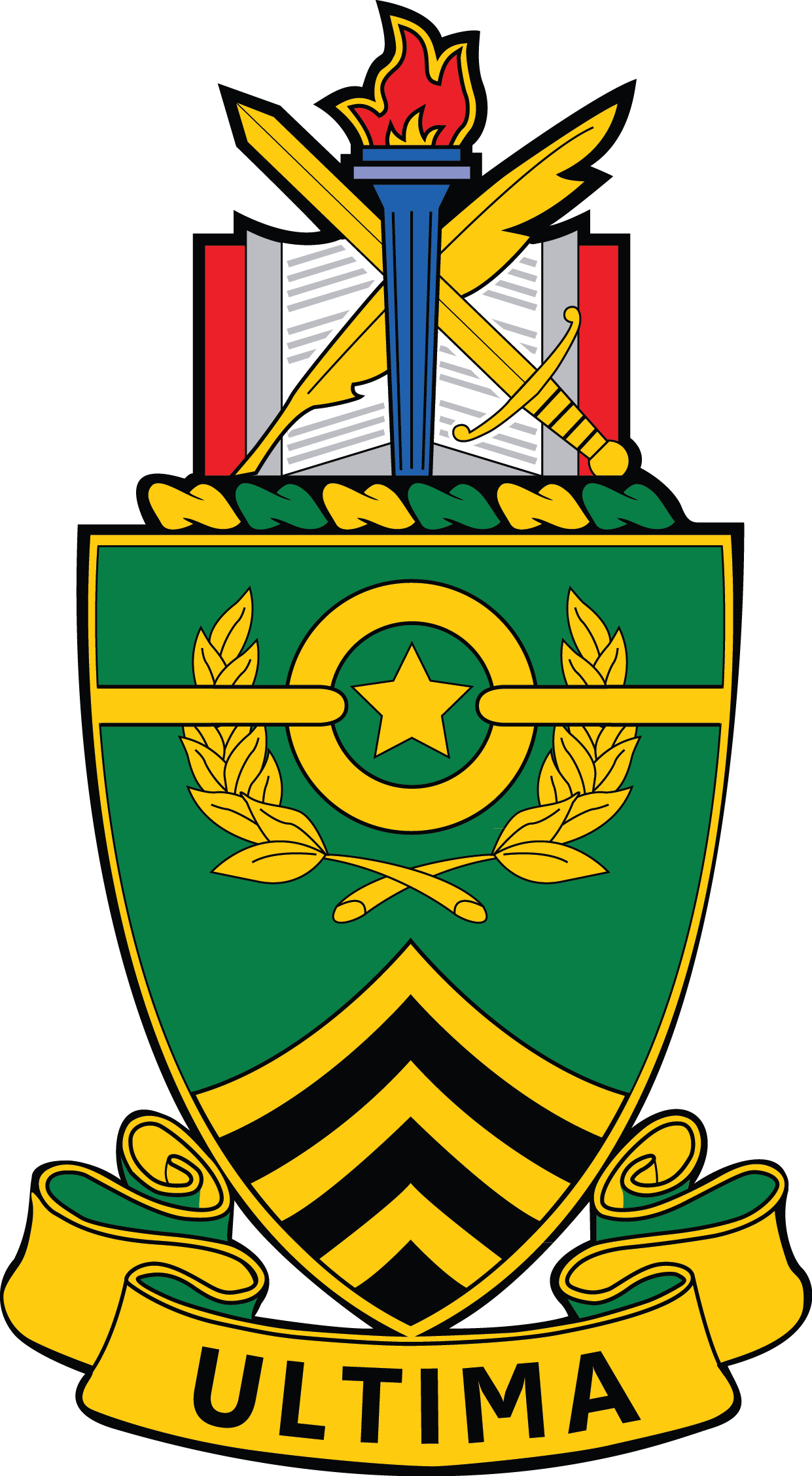
- United States Army Sergeants Major Academy distinctive unit insignia
- Active: 1972–present
- Country: United States
- Branch: United States Army
- Type: Senior noncommissioned officer school
- Part of: United States Army Combined Arms Command
- Garrison/HQ: Fort Bliss, Texas
- Motto: Ultima

Insignia
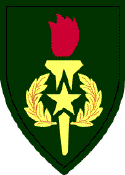
- USASMA Shoulder sleeve insignia

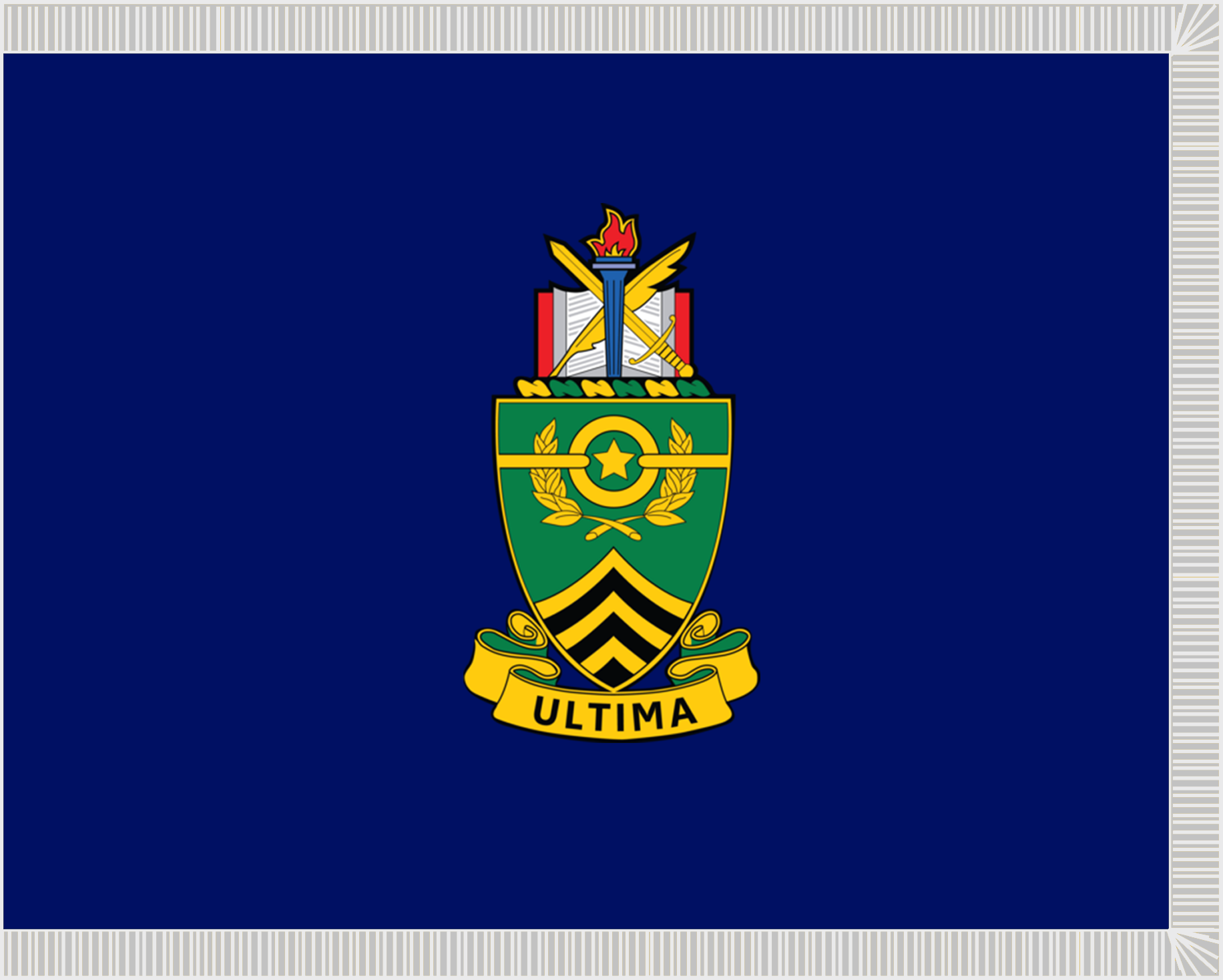
- US Army Sergeants Major Academy Flag

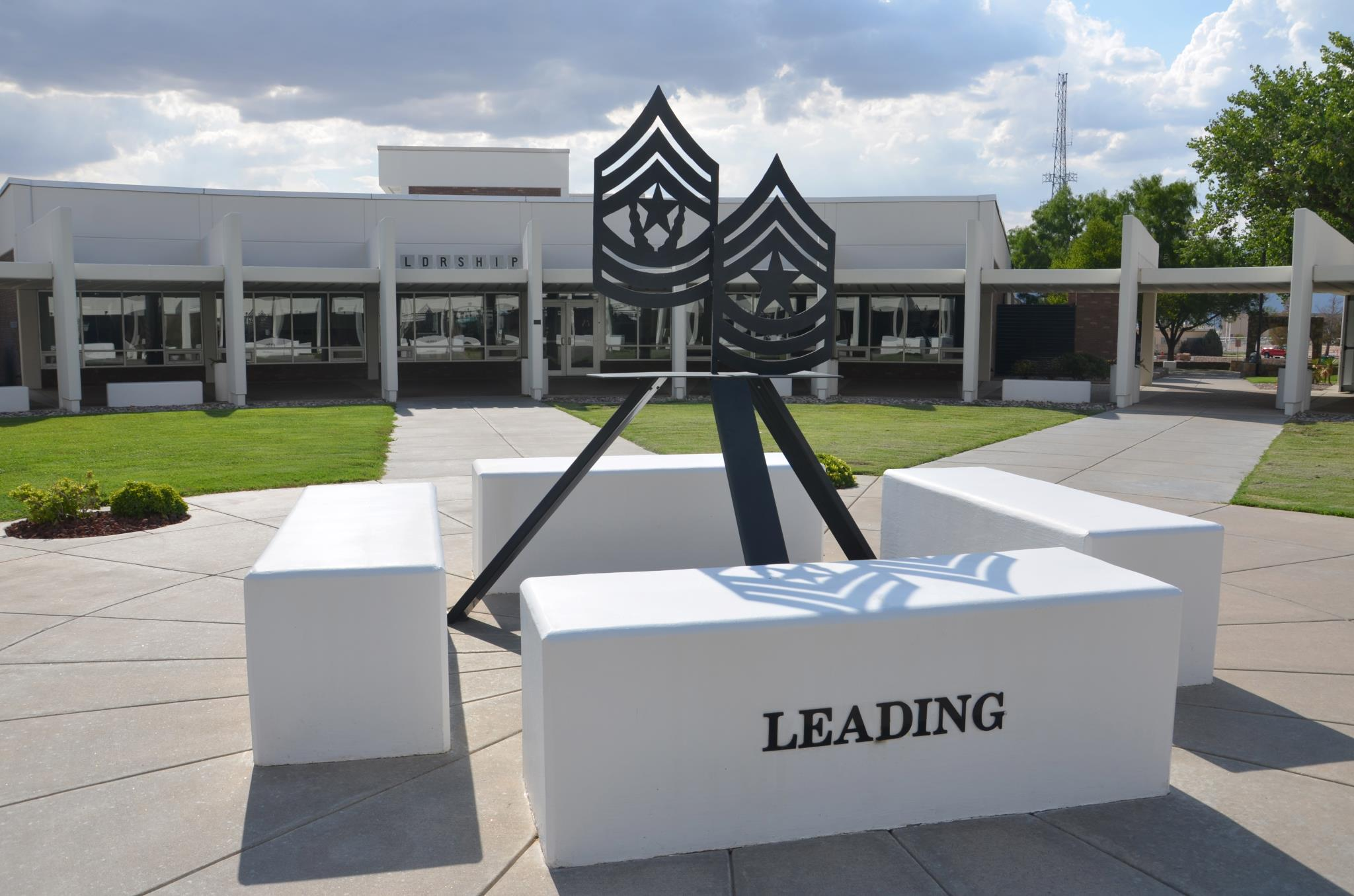
The Sergeants Major Academy center quad

The United States Army Sergeants Major Academy (USASMA) was established on 1 July 1972 at Fort Bliss, Texas, and began instruction in January, 1973. Its curriculum is designed to broaden the student's current knowledge base. This approach differs from the Military Occupational Specialty (MOS) related training at the basic and advanced levels of the Noncommissioned Officer Education System. The prime educational technique employed throughout the course is the small group participatory learning process.

== Courses ==
=== Basic Leader Course ===
The Sergeants Major Academy was established by General Order in July 1972 and started educating sergeants major in January 1973 with Class 1 consisting of 105 students. The academy was also given the mission to further the efforts to standardize noncommissioned officer education, resulting in the addition of the Primary Leadership Development Course (PLDC), now known as the Basic Leadership Course (BLC). This course is a blend of the NCO Candidate Course and the original Noncommissioned office Basic Course and then later the combination of the Primary Leadership Course (PLC) and the Primary Noncommissioned Officer Course (PNCOC) and the Primary Technical Course (PTC) into one course that provided leadership tools to non-specific military occupations at the junior NCO level. It was newly structured against critical task and input from current operations learned during Operations Enduring and Iraqi Freedom. USASMA is the Army's proponent for course development for the Basic Leader Course to educate junior noncommissioned officers preparing to assume positions as team or section sergeants.

=== Advanced Leader Course ===
USASMA developed the common leader training for the Basic NCO Course (BNCOC), and has been the proponent since 1984. BNCOC transitioned to the Advanced Leader Course (ALC) in 2008. USASMA is responsible for the development and delivery of common core leader tasks for the Advanced Leader Course-Common Core (ALC-CC) as of October 2009 delivering 82 hours of course material to nearly 14,000 sergeants annually. This course focuses on leadership and technical skills required to prepare soldiers selected for promotion to staff sergeant to effectively lead squad/platoon size units. ALC is typically attended by NCOs in the ranks of Sergeant and Staff Sergeant. MOS-specific versions of ALC are taught at the branch level.

=== Structured Self-Development ===
Starting in October 2010, the Sergeants Major Academy developed and delivered level I of Structured Self-Development (SSD) where every soldier graduating from advanced individual training is automatically enrolled and must complete it to be eligible for attendance to the Basic Leader Course or promotion to sergeant. There is no level II SSD as ALC-CC substitutes for level II participation. SSD III concentrates on platoon-level tasks and is required for staff sergeants for them to be eligible for attendance to the Senior Leader Course and consideration for promotion to sergeant first class. SSD IV was developed and launched for Master Sergeants to complete as a prerequisite for attendance to the Sergeants Major Course. SSD V trains promotable master sergeants and sergeants major for nominative and joint assignments and will be a requirement for those positions starting 1 January 2015.

=== Former Leadership ===
Commandant: CSM Raymond F. Chandler, 1st Enlisted Commandant

== Notable alumni ==
- William A. Connelly, 6th SMA
- Glen E. Morrell, 7th SMA
- Michele S. Jones, First Female Honor Graduate
- Robert J. Lloyd, 6th Master Chief Petty Officer of the Coast Guard
- Vincent W. Patton III, 8th Master Chief Petty Officer of the Coast Guard
- James L. Herdt, 9th Master Chief Petty Officer of the Navy
- Charles W. Bowen, 10th Master Chief Petty Officer of the Coast Guard
- Raymond F. Chandler, First Enlisted Commandant of USASMA, 14th SMA

== Hall of Honor ==
The United States Army Sergeants Major Academy's Hall of Honor was established on 5 May 2006 as "a means of recognizing outstanding individuals who have made significant and long-lasting contributions to the USASMA and the Army’s NCO Education System." To date there have been 28 members selected for that honor.

== Staff College branch campus ==
USASMA was accredited as a branch campus of the Command and General Staff College (CGSC) in 2018. CGSC Combined Arms Center Execution Order, dated 21 March 2018, made USASMA the 4th campus of CGSC. On 21 June 2019 USASMA Class 69 became the first students from the Sergeants Major Course to earn Bachelors of Arts in Leadership and Workforce Development (Staff College) through USASMA. The accreditation process took 10 years, beginning with the last officer commandant, Col. Donald E. Gentry.
