= Service stripe =

Military insignia

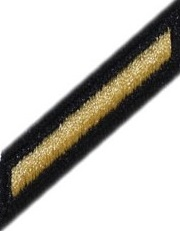
- Service stripe worn on a Cold War era U.S. Army Green Uniform soldier's coat denoting between 3 and 5 years' honorable service.
- Material: Cloth

A service stripe is an embroidered diagonal stripe worn on the sleeve(s) of some military and paramilitary uniforms. In the case of the United States military, service stripes are authorized for wear by enlisted personnel on the lower part of the sleeve of a uniform to denote length of service. Service stripes vary in size and in color.

== Denmark ==
In 2025, the Danish Defence introduced anciennitetsstriber (transl. seniority stripes) for all enlisted personnel. Awarded after every third year of service, a total of 17 stripes (representing 51 years) can be worn on the left sleeve.

== France ==
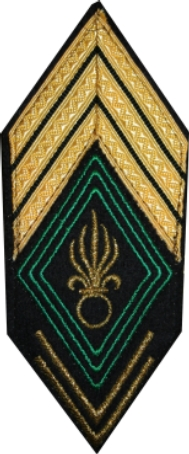
Sergent-chef insignia featuring two inverted seniority chevrons for the Legion Etrangere.

In 1777, the French ancien régime-era army had used Galons d'ancienneté (transl. Seniority Braid) worn on the upper sleeves awarded for each seven years of enlistment. Soldiers who wore such emblems were called briscards ("breakers"). The practice was continued in Napoleon Bonaparte's army in which they were awarded for 10, 15, and 20 years of service. The French Army later moved them to the lower sleeves and the rank stripes to the upper sleeves. Service chevrons were worn on the lower left sleeve and Wound Stripes were worn on the lower right sleeve (influencing the U.S. Wound Chevron device).

Today, certain French units, including the French Foreign Legion, award seniority chevrons to its enlisted troops and non-commissioned officers. One gold chevron is awarded for every five years' worth of service, and are worn pointing downwards below the rank insignia and unit badge on the left arm.

== Norway ==
In the Norwegian Army, the tjenestestriper (transl. service stripes) are only worn by enlisted personnel and are awarded after every third year of service. The stripes are worn on both sleeves on service and parade uniforms.

== United States ==
Sleeve stripes (known informally as "hash marks") are worn only by enlisted personnel. U.S. Army Soldiers, U.S. Navy Sailors and U.S. Coast Guardsmen wear their stripes on the bottom cuff of the left sleeve, where U.S. Marines wear them at the bottom cuff of both sleeves. Since 1953 U.S. Soldiers wear them on the left sleeve and Overseas Service Bars on the right one. Prior to 1953, Overseas Service Bars were worn on the left sleeve. Service stripes are only worn on formal uniforms, and are not seen on work uniforms.

Navy service stripes come in three colors and they are red, gold, and blue. They are 7 inches long and three-eighths of an inch wide for male Chief Petty Officers; male Sailors from rates Seaman Recruit to Petty Officer First Class wear service stripes 5.25 inches long and three-eighths of an inch wide. Female navy sailors wear service stripes 5.25 inches long and a quarter-inch wide. They are worn two inches above the left sleeve cuff on jackets, and 1.5 inches above the cuff on service dress blue jumpers and the new summer white jumpers. On the old-style summer white jumpers they are worn two inches above the cuff. Multiple Navy service stripes are worn a quarter-inch apart from each other.

=== History ===
In the United States, the concept of a service stripe dates back to 1782 when, during the American Revolution, George Washington ordered that enlisted men who had served for three years "with bravery, fidelity and good conduct" should wear "a narrow piece of white cloth, of angular form" on the left sleeve of the uniform coat. In the U.S. Army, sleeve stripes denoted a successful completion of a standard enlistment. They were the same color as the enlisted rank stripes and were "half-chevrons" (angled strips of cloth). Service during the American Civil War was denoted by a red stripe bordered by the rank stripe color (called a "Blood Stripe"). The artillery corps, who wore red stripes on their uniforms, wore a white stripe bordered red instead.

=== Criteria ===
The United States Army authorizes one stripe for each three-year period of service, while the United States Marine Corps, United States Navy, and United States Coast Guard authorize one stripe for each four-year period of duty.

In contrast to the Army, the Navy and Marine Corps Good Conduct Medals, a service stripe is authorized for wear by enlisted personnel upon completion of the specified term of service, regardless of the service member's disciplinary history. For example, a sailor or marine with several non-judicial punishments and courts-martial would still be authorized a service stripe for each four-year period of service, although the Good Conduct Medal would be denied.

=== United States Navy, U.S. Marine Corps, and U.S. Coast Guard ===
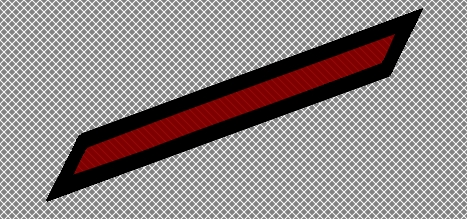
A red U.S. Navy service stripe, denoting four years of service.

For the U.S. Navy, Marine Corps, and Coast Guard, service stripes are given to service members for every four years of service.

==== Color ====
The U.S. Navy authorizes gold service stripes for those sailors with over twelve cumulative years' of service. Until June 2019, the service member had to have been free of disciplinary action in the U.S. Navy and U.S. Navy Reserve. During the period when that rule was in effect, in cases where a disciplinary infraction had occurred, the Sailor was not denied a service stripe but simply was authorized the standard red stripe design only.

Like the U.S. Navy, the U.S. Coast Guard authorizes gold and red service stripes, however the color in the case of the latter does not depend on time in service, but rather on rank: Junior enlisted personnel (i.e. those in paygrades E-1 to E-6) wear red service stripes, whereas chief petty officers (i.e. those in paygrades E-7 to E-9) wear gold service stripes.

=== United States Military Academy ===
These stripes are also used on the sleeves of the full dress uniform worn by cadets of the United States Military Academy at West Point, which denote the number of years a cadet has been at the academy. This is also done by cadets of other military colleges and prep schools.

The diagonal stripes are located near the cuffs of long sleeves of coats (between upper and middle buttons), gold in colour and are numbered thusly: no stripes for a fourth class cadet, one for third class, two for second class and three stripes for a first class cadet.

=== United States Air Force ===
The United States Air Force is the only branch of service that does not authorize service stripes. The Air Force Longevity Service Ribbon is awarded instead. Historically, persons who were in the Army Air Forces and then became part of the Air Force when it was separated from the Army in 1947 could continue to wear their service stripes.

=== U.S. law enforcement use ===
In many civilian law enforcement agencies in the United States, police officers, state troopers, constables, and sheriff's deputies will often be awarded service stripes for wear on their long-sleeved uniforms, usually on the lower left sleeve. One stripe may be worn for varying lengths of time and differs by agency; for instance the Los Angeles Police Department issues one service stripe for every five years served, as does the New York Police Department.
