= Award numerals =

United States military award device

Award Numerals
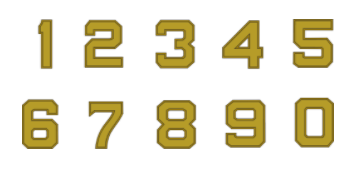
- Type: Ribbon Device
- Awarded for: Multiple awards of the same decoration
- Sponsored by: United States Army United States Navy
- Status: Currently Awarded
- Established: 1944

An Arabic numeral device or numeral device sometimes called an "award numeral", is a United States Armed Forces service device that may be authorized for wear on specific service ribbons and suspension ribbons of medals. Arabic numeral devices are bronze or gold in color and are 3/16 inch in height.

Arabic numerals are worn to denote award of a second or subsequent award for which a member has already received the initial decoration or award. The ribbon denotes the first award and numerals starting with the numeral 2 denote the total number of awards. The 3/16 inch numerals are similar to the 5/16 inch Strike/Flight numerals worn by the United States Navy and Marine Corps.

Armed Forces Reserve Medal ribbon with "M" Device & Numeral 2 device

U.S. military decorations and awards that may be authorized an Arabic Numeral device are as follows:

- Air Medal
- Armed Forces Reserve Medal (only in conjunction with the "M" device)
- NCO Professional Development Ribbon (numerals indicate the level of the course graduated, not multiple decorations)
- Army Overseas Service Ribbon
- Army Reserve Components Overseas Training Ribbon
- Navy Recruiting Service Ribbon
- Multinational Force and Observers Medal

With the exception of the Air Medal and Armed Forces Reserve Medal service ribbons and suspension ribbons, the United States Army is the only service branch to currently use numerals on other service ribbons, and the Navy on their Recruiting Service Ribbon. During World War II, some Naval Construction Battalions (Seabees) were issued the Asiatic-Pacific Campaign Medal with numerals instead of service stars.

== See also ==
- United States military award devices
- Awards and decorations of the United States military
- Medal bar
