= Brier =

Briar, Briars, Brier, or Briers may refer to:

- Briar or brier, common name for a number of unrelated thorny plants that form thickets, including species in the genera Rosa (rose), Rubus (brambles), and Smilax

== People and characters ==
- Brier (surname)
- Briers, a surname
- Briars (surname)
- Briar Bearss, an American politician.
- Briar Blush, an American drag performer.
- Naren Briar, an American politician.

=== Fictional characters ===
- Briar, a playable character in the video game League of Legends
- Briar, a character in the video game Pokémon Scarlet and Violet's downloadable content expansion pack The Hidden Treasure of Area Zero
- Briar, the evil sister of Rose in Bone (comics)
- Briar, in the cartoon series Boonie Bears
- Briar Beauty, the daughter of Sleeping Beauty from the fashion doll franchise Ever After High
- Briar Cudgeon, in Artemis Fowl
- Briar Moss, from Tamora Pierce's Circle of Magic and Circle Opens quartets
- Briar Raleigh, a Marvel Comics character associated with Magneto
- Briar Rose, a name associated with Sleeping Beauty, in some (including Brothers Grimm) versions of the story

== Places ==
- Briar, Missouri, U.S.
- Briar, Texas, U.S.
- The Briars (Georgina), Ontario, Canada, a lakeside resort
- Brier, Washington, U.S.
- Briers, Mississippi, U.S., a ghost town
- Brier Island, Nova Scotia, Canada
- Briar Creek (disambiguation), or Brier Creek
- Briar Hill (disambiguation)
- Brier Hill (disambiguation)

=== Facilities and structures ===
- Briars, Saint Helena, a small pavilion in which Napoleon Bonaparte stayed
  - The Briars, Mount Martha, on the Mornington Peninsula, Victoria, Australia, an historic homestead named in honour of Briars, in Saint Helena
  - The Briars, Wahroonga, Sydney, Australia, an historic house named in honour of Briars, in Saint Helena and The Briars, in Mount Martha
- The Briars (Natchez, Mississippi), U.S., a historic house

== Other uses ==
- Briar root, wood from Erica arborea, used for making smoking pipes
  - Briar, a type of tobacco pipe
- The Brier, a bonspiel, the Canadian men's curling championship
- Briar (software), an open-source software communication technology
- Brier score, a metric to assess the predictive quality of a model

== See also ==
- Briar Patch (disambiguation)
- Briar Rose (disambiguation)
- Brière (disambiguation)
- Blackbriar (disambiguation)
- Greenbrier (disambiguation)
- The Briar King, a 2003 novel by Greg Keyes
- Brier score, a probability-related measure
