= Greenbrier =

Greenbrier or Green Brier may refer to:

- Smilax, a plant genus commonly called greenbrier

== Places in the United States ==
- Greenbrier, Alabama
- Greenbrier, Arkansas
- Green Brier, Illinois
- Greenbrier, Indiana (disambiguation)
- Greenbrier, Lexington, Kentucky
- Greenbrier, Missouri
- Greenbrier, Tennessee
- Greenbrier, Virginia
- Greenbrier (Great Smoky Mountains), a valley Tennessee
- Greenbrier County, West Virginia
- The Greenbrier, a resort in White Sulphur Springs, West Virginia

== Streams ==
- Greenbrier River, in West Virginia, U.S.
- Greenbrier Creek (Rocky River tributary), in North Carolina, U.S.

== Other uses ==
- Greenbrier (film), the working title of El Camino: A Breaking Bad Movie
- Greenbrier Classic, a PGA golf tournament
- The Greenbrier Companies, an American manufacturing corporation
- Greenbrier High School (disambiguation)
- Chevrolet Greenbrier, the name of two vehicles

== See also ==
- Brier (disambiguation)
- Greenbriar (disambiguation)
