= Geography of Michigan =

Michigan map, including territorial waters.

Michigan consists of two peninsulas surrounded primarily by four of the Great Lakes and a variety of nearby islands. The Upper Peninsula is bounded on the southwest by Wisconsin, and the Lower Peninsula is bounded on the south by Indiana and Ohio. Both land masses are also separated from the Canadian province of Ontario by waterways of the Great Lakes, and from each other by the Straits of Mackinac. Because its land is largely surrounded by the Great Lakes, which flow into the Saint Lawrence River, Michigan is the only U.S. state whose streams and rivers are almost entirely within the Great Lakes-St. Lawrence watershed. Besides the island state of Hawaii, Michigan is the only state whose area is largely composed of non-contiguous parts, and before the completion of the Mackinac Bridge was entirely bifurcated between its upper and lower peninsulas.

Michigan's territorial waters include roughly half each of Lake Superior, Lake Michigan, and Lake Huron, and smaller areas of Lake St. Clair and Lake Erie. It includes an estimated 11,000 inland lakes. It encompasses 58,110 square miles (150,500 km^{2}) of land, 38,575 square miles (99,910 km^{2}) of Great Lakes waters, and 1,305 square miles (3,380 km^{2}) of inland waters. Its territorial waters are second in area only to those of Alaska. At a total area of 97,990 square miles (253,800 km^{2}) – including those territorial waters – Michigan is the largest state east of the Mississippi River, and the eleventh largest state overall. More than half of the state's land area – 30,156 square miles (78,100 km^{2}) – is still forest.

The state lies roughly between 41° and 49° north latitude, and between 82° and 91° west longitude.

== Upper Peninsula ==
Upper Peninsula of Michigan

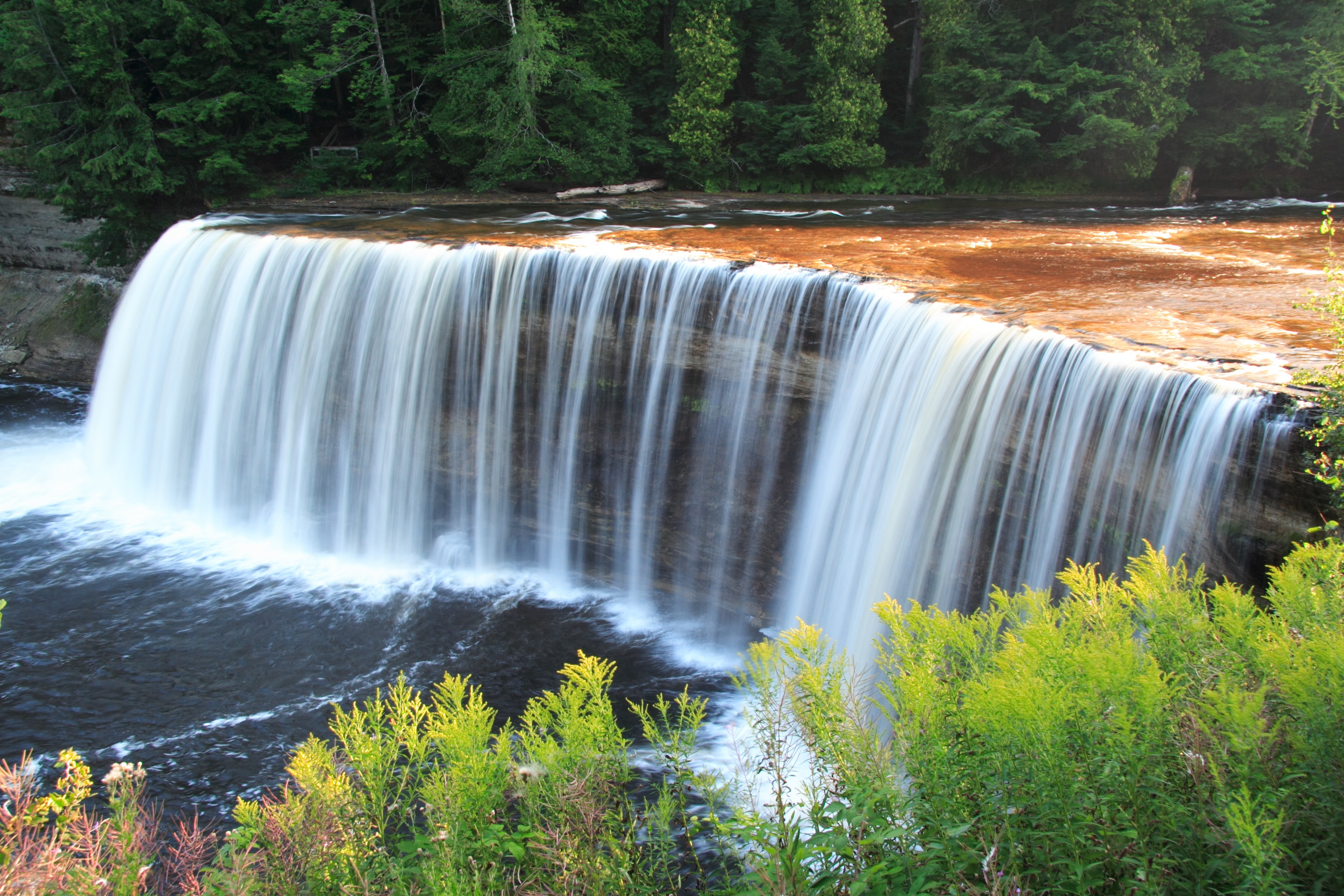
Tahquamenon Falls in the Upper Peninsula of Michigan.

The heavily forested Upper Peninsula is relatively mountainous in the west. The Porcupine Mountains, which are part of one of the oldest mountain chains in the world, rise to an altitude of almost 2,000 feet (610 m) above sea level and form the watershed between the streams flowing into Lake Superior and Lake Michigan. The surface on either side of this range is rugged. The state's highest point, in the Huron Mountains northwest of Marquette, is Mount Arvon at 1,979 feet (603 m). The peninsula is as large as Connecticut, Delaware, Massachusetts, and Rhode Island combined but has only about 300,000 inhabitants.

The geographic orientation of Michigan's peninsulas makes for a long distance between the ends of the state. Ironwood, in the far western Upper Peninsula, lies 630 highway miles (1,015 km) from Lambertville in the Lower Peninsula's southeastern corner. The geographic isolation of the Upper Peninsula from Michigan's political and population centers makes the U.P. culturally and economically distinct.

== Lower Peninsula ==
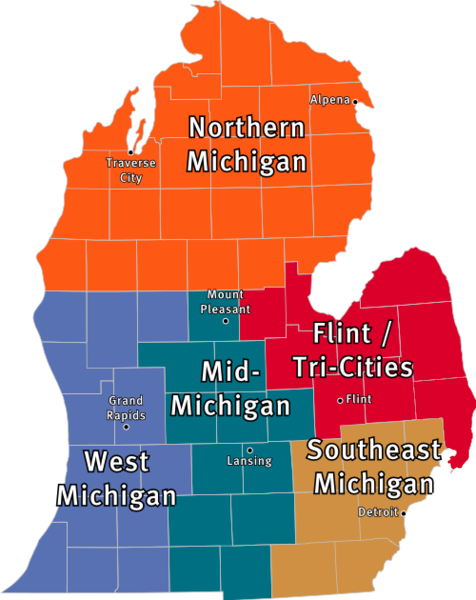
Regions in the Lower Peninsula.

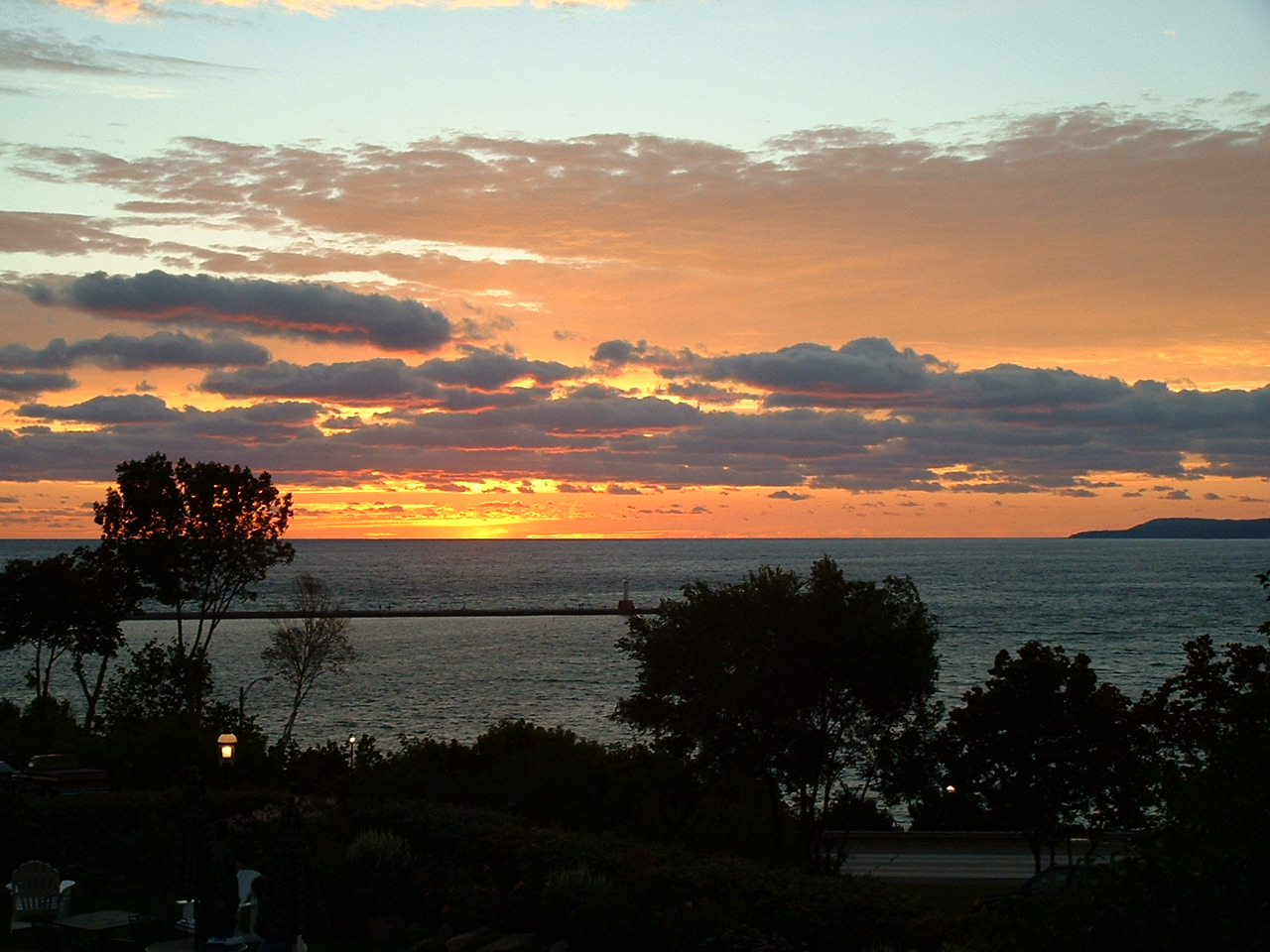
Little Traverse Bay at sunset, viewed from Petoskey

The Lower Peninsula, shaped like a mitten, is 277 miles (446 km) long from north to south and 195 miles (314 km) from east to west and occupies more than two-thirds of the state's land area. The surface of the peninsula is generally level, broken by conical hills and glacial moraines usually not more than a few hundred feet tall. The highest point in the Lower Peninsula is either Briar Hill at 1,705 feet (520 m), or one of several points nearby in the vicinity of Cadillac. The lowest point is the surface of Lake Erie at 571 feet (174 m).

A feature of Michigan that gives it the distinct shape of a mitten is the Thumb. This peninsula projects out into Lake Huron and the Saginaw Bay. The geography of the Thumb is mainly flat with a few rolling hills. The Leelanau Peninsula lies in the Northern Lower Michigan region. See Also Michigan Regions

== Great Lakes ==
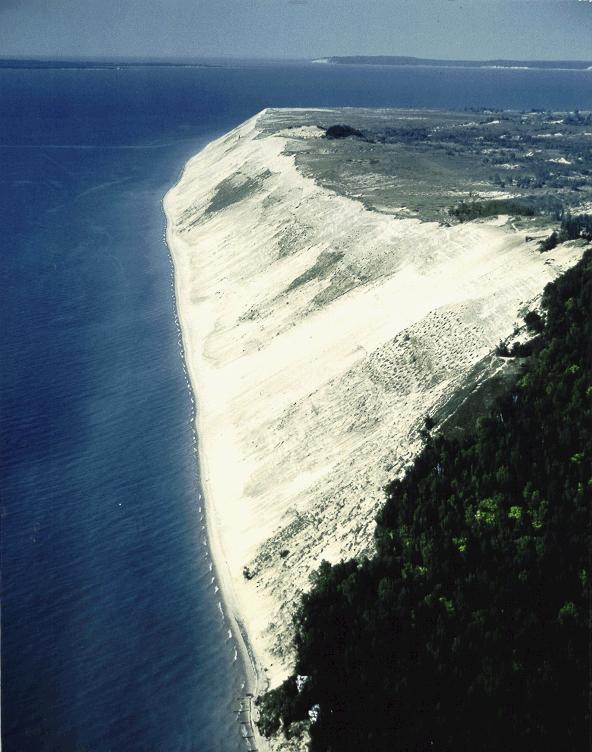
Aerial view of Sleeping Bear Dunes

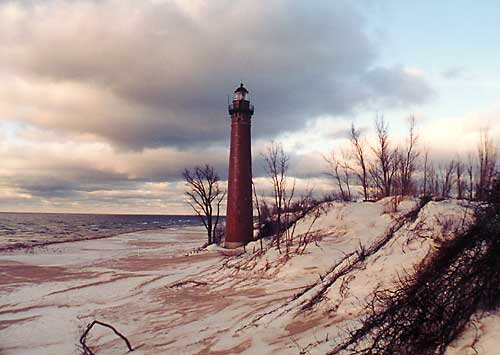
Little Sable Point Light south of Pentwater, Michigan.

The Great Lakes that form most of the water boundary of Michigan are Lake Erie, Lake Huron, Lake Michigan, and Lake Superior. Because of the historical importance of shipping on the lakes, Michigan has about 150 lighthouses, more than any other state. (see Lighthouses in the United States) The state is bounded on the south by the states of Ohio and Indiana, sharing land and water boundaries with both.

Michigan's northern boundaries are almost entirely water boundaries, from south to north, with Illinois and Wisconsin in Lake Michigan; then a land boundary with Wisconsin and the Upper Peninsula, that is principally demarcated by the Menominee and Montreal Rivers; then water boundaries again, in Lake Superior, with Wisconsin and Minnesota to the west, capped around by the Canadian province of Ontario to the north and east.

The northern boundary then runs completely through Lake Superior, from the western boundary with Minnesota to a point north of and around Isle Royale, thence traveling southeastward through the lake in a reasonably straight line to the Sault Ste. Marie area. In Southeastern Michigan there is a water boundary with Canada along the entire lengths of the St. Clair River, Lake St. Clair (including the First Nation reserve of Walpole Island) and the Detroit River. The southeastern boundary ends in the western end of Lake Erie with a three-way convergence of Michigan, Ohio and Ontario.

With the exception of two tiny areas on its borders – one drained by the Mississippi River by way of the Wisconsin River in the Upper Peninsula, the other by way of the Kankakee-Illinois River in the Lower Peninsula – the rivers and streams of Michigan drain entirely into the Great Lakes.

The larger islands of Michigan include Isle Royale and Grand Island in Lake Superior; Neebish and Sugar islands in the St. Mary's River; Drummond Island, Les Cheneaux Islands, Mackinac Island, Bois Blanc Island, and Charity Island in Lake Huron; Beaver Island, the Fox Islands, North Manitou Island, and South Manitou Island in Lake Michigan; Harsens Island in Lake St. Clair; and Belle Isle and Grosse Ile in the Detroit River.

Keweenaw Bay, Whitefish Bay, and the Big and Little Bay de Noc are the principal bays of the Upper Peninsula. The Grand and Little Traverse, Thunder, and Saginaw bays are found on the Lower Peninsula. After Alaska, Michigan has the longest shoreline of any state, 3,288 miles (5,292 km). An additional 1,056 miles (1,699 km) can be added if islands are included. This roughly equals the length of the Atlantic Coast from Maine to Florida.

== Inland lakes and rivers ==
The state has 11,037 inland lakes comprising 1,305 square miles (3,380 km^{2}) of inland water. No point in Michigan is more than 6 miles (9.7 km) from an inland lake or more than 85 miles (137 km) from one of the Great Lakes.

The state's numerous rivers are generally short and shallow, though several are navigable by recreational watercraft. The principal ones include the Au Sable, Thunder Bay, Cheboygan, and Saginaw, all of which flow into Lake Huron; the Ontonagon, and Tahquamenon, which flow into Lake Superior; and the St. Joseph, Kalamazoo, Grand, Muskegon, Manistee, and Escanaba, which flow into Lake Michigan.

== Protected areas ==
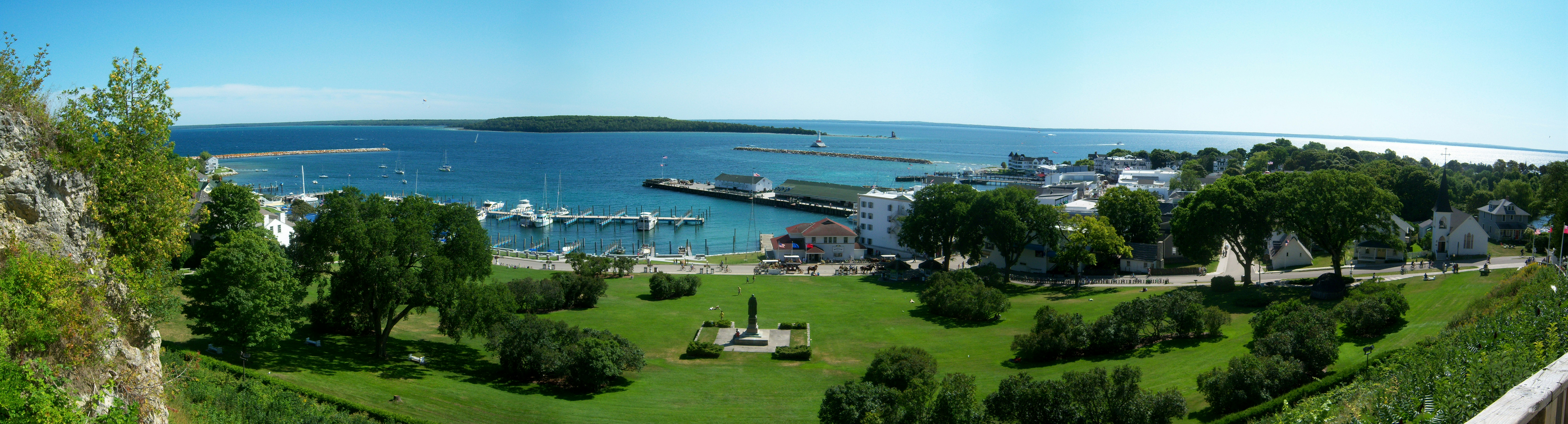
Marquette Park on Mackinac Island

The state is home to three National Park Service preserves: Isle Royale National Park, located in Lake Superior, about 30 miles (48 km) southeast of Thunder Bay, Ontario; Pictured Rocks National Lakeshore, on the Lake Superior shore between Munising and Grand Marais; and Sleeping Bear Dunes National Lakeshore, on the Lake Michigan shore between the villages of Frankfort, Empire, and Glen Arbor.

Other national protected areas in the state include: Keweenaw National Historical Park, Huron National Forest, Manistee National Forest, Hiawatha National Forest, Ottawa National Forest, Fumee Lake Natural Area, and Father Marquette National Memorial. The largest section of the North Country National Scenic Trail also passes through Michigan.

With 78 state parks, 19 state recreation areas, and 6 state forests, Michigan has the largest state park and state forest system of any state. These parks and forests include Holland State Park, Mackinac Island State Park, Au Sable State Forest, and Mackinaw State Forest.

== Climate ==
Michigan map of Köppen climate classification.

Michigan has a humid continental climate, although there are two distinct regions. The southern third of the Lower Peninsula (south of Saginaw Bay and from the Grand Rapids area southward) have a warmer climate (Köppen climate classification Dfa) with hot summers and cold winters. The northern two-thirds of the Lower Peninsula and the entire Upper Peninsula has a more severe climate (Köppen Dfb), with warm, but shorter summers and longer, cold to very cold winters. Some parts of the state average high temperatures below freezing from December through February, and into early March in the far northern parts. During the winter through the middle of February parts of the state are frequently subjected to heavy lake-effect snow. The state averages from 30–40 inches (76–102 centimetres) of precipitation annually. Snow cover tends to be intermittent in the southern part of the state, but persistent in northern Lower Michigan and especially in the Upper Peninsula.

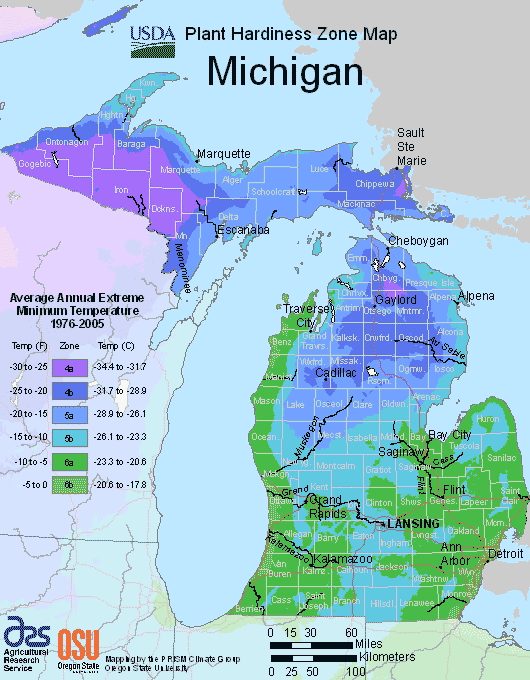
Michigan USDA Plant Hardiness Zone Map.

The entire state averages 30 days of thunderstorm activity per year. These can be severe, especially in the southern part of the state. The state averages 17 tornadoes per year, which are more common in the extreme southern portion of the state. Portions of the southern border have been nearly as vulnerable historically as parts of Tornado Alley. Farther north, in the Upper Peninsula, tornadoes are rare.

Climate data for Detroit (DTW), 1991–2020 normals, (Note: Mean monthly maxima and minima (i.e. the highest and lowest temperature readings during an entire month or year) calculated based on data at said location from 1991 to 2020.) extremes 1874–present (Note: Official records for Detroit were kept at downtown from January 1874 to December 1933, Detroit City Airport from February 1934 to March 1966, and at DTW since April 1966. For more information, see ThreadEx.)
Month	Jan	Feb	Mar	Apr	May	Jun	Jul	Aug	Sep	Oct	Nov	Dec	Year
Record high °F (°C)	67 (19)	73 (23)	86 (30)	89 (32)	95 (35)	104 (40)	105 (41)	104 (40)	100 (38)	92 (33)	81 (27)	69 (21)	105 (41)
Mean maximum °F (°C)	53.0 (11.7)	55.3 (12.9)	69.3 (20.7)	79.6 (26.4)	87.2 (30.7)	92.6 (33.7)	93.8 (34.3)	92.1 (33.4)	89.3 (31.8)	80.6 (27.0)	66.7 (19.3)	56.1 (13.4)	95.4 (35.2)
Mean daily maximum °F (°C)	32.3 (0.2)	35.2 (1.8)	45.9 (7.7)	58.7 (14.8)	70.3 (21.3)	79.7 (26.5)	83.7 (28.7)	81.4 (27.4)	74.4 (23.6)	62.0 (16.7)	48.6 (9.2)	37.2 (2.9)	59.1 (15.1)
Daily mean °F (°C)	25.8 (−3.4)	28.0 (−2.2)	37.2 (2.9)	48.9 (9.4)	60.3 (15.7)	69.9 (21.1)	74.1 (23.4)	72.3 (22.4)	64.9 (18.3)	53.0 (11.7)	41.2 (5.1)	31.3 (−0.4)	50.6 (10.3)
Mean daily minimum °F (°C)	19.2 (−7.1)	20.8 (−6.2)	28.6 (−1.9)	39.1 (3.9)	50.2 (10.1)	60.2 (15.7)	64.4 (18.0)	63.2 (17.3)	55.5 (13.1)	44.0 (6.7)	33.9 (1.1)	25.3 (−3.7)	42.0 (5.6)
Mean minimum °F (°C)	0.1 (−17.7)	3.5 (−15.8)	12.0 (−11.1)	25.5 (−3.6)	36.3 (2.4)	47.3 (8.5)	54.1 (12.3)	53.4 (11.9)	41.6 (5.3)	31.0 (−0.6)	19.8 (−6.8)	8.8 (−12.9)	−3.7 (−19.8)
Record low °F (°C)	−21 (−29)	−20 (−29)	−4 (−20)	8 (−13)	25 (−4)	36 (2)	42 (6)	38 (3)	29 (−2)	17 (−8)	0 (−18)	−11 (−24)	−21 (−29)
Average precipitation inches (mm)	2.23 (57)	2.08 (53)	2.43 (62)	3.26 (83)	3.72 (94)	3.26 (83)	3.51 (89)	3.26 (83)	3.22 (82)	2.53 (64)	2.57 (65)	2.25 (57)	34.32 (872)
Average snowfall inches (cm)	14.0 (36)	12.5 (32)	6.2 (16)	1.5 (3.8)	0.0 (0.0)	0.0 (0.0)	0.0 (0.0)	0.0 (0.0)	0.0 (0.0)	0.0 (0.0)	1.9 (4.8)	8.9 (23)	45.0 (114)
Average extreme snow depth inches (cm)	7.1 (18)	6.6 (17)	4.4 (11)	0.8 (2.0)	0.0 (0.0)	0.0 (0.0)	0.0 (0.0)	0.0 (0.0)	0.0 (0.0)	0.0 (0.0)	1.1 (2.8)	4.3 (11)	10.0 (25)
Average precipitation days (≥ 0.01 in)	13.4	11.0	11.1	12.5	12.9	10.7	10.5	9.7	9.5	10.6	11.0	13.1	136.0
Average snowy days (≥ 0.1 in)	10.7	9.2	5.3	1.5	0.1	0.0	0.0	0.0	0.0	0.2	2.6	8.0	37.6
Average relative humidity (%)	74.7	72.5	70.0	66.0	65.3	67.3	68.5	71.5	73.4	71.6	74.6	76.7	71.0
Average dew point °F (°C)	16.2 (−8.8)	17.6 (−8.0)	25.9 (−3.4)	35.1 (1.7)	45.7 (7.6)	55.6 (13.1)	60.4 (15.8)	59.7 (15.4)	53.2 (11.8)	41.4 (5.2)	32.4 (0.2)	21.9 (−5.6)	38.7 (3.7)
Mean monthly sunshine hours	119.9	138.3	184.9	217.0	275.9	301.8	317.0	283.5	227.6	176.0	106.3	87.7	2,435.9
Percentage possible sunshine	41	47	50	54	61	66	69	66	61	51	36	31	55
Average ultraviolet index	1.2	2.0	3.6	5.4	6.9	8.0	8.2	7.1	5.3	3.1	1.6	1.1	4.4
Source 1: NOAA (relative humidity, dew point, and sun 1961–1990)
Source 2: UV Index Today (1995 to 2022)

Climate data for Grand Rapids, Michigan (Gerald Ford Int'l), 1991–2020 normals, extremes 1892–present (Note: Official records for Grand Rapids kept June 1892 to December 1940 at downtown, at the first Grand Rapids Airport some 4 mi (6.4 km) south of downtown from January 1941 to November 23, 1963, and at Gerald Ford Int'l since its opening on November 24, 1963. For more information, see Threadex.)
Month	Jan	Feb	Mar	Apr	May	Jun	Jul	Aug	Sep	Oct	Nov	Dec	Year
Record high °F (°C)	66 (19)	73 (23)	87 (31)	90 (32)	95 (35)	102 (39)	108 (42)	102 (39)	98 (37)	89 (32)	81 (27)	69 (21)	108 (42)
Mean maximum °F (°C)	51.3 (10.7)	51.9 (11.1)	67.9 (19.9)	79.2 (26.2)	86.0 (30.0)	91.8 (33.2)	92.5 (33.6)	91.1 (32.8)	87.8 (31.0)	78.8 (26.0)	65.3 (18.5)	54.4 (12.4)	94.3 (34.6)
Mean daily maximum °F (°C)	31.0 (−0.6)	33.7 (0.9)	44.5 (6.9)	57.8 (14.3)	69.8 (21.0)	79.4 (26.3)	83.1 (28.4)	80.9 (27.2)	73.9 (23.3)	60.7 (15.9)	47.2 (8.4)	36.1 (2.3)	58.2 (14.6)
Daily mean °F (°C)	24.8 (−4.0)	26.6 (−3.0)	35.7 (2.1)	47.6 (8.7)	59.2 (15.1)	68.9 (20.5)	72.8 (22.7)	71.1 (21.7)	63.5 (17.5)	51.5 (10.8)	40.0 (4.4)	30.4 (−0.9)	49.3 (9.6)
Mean daily minimum °F (°C)	18.6 (−7.4)	19.5 (−6.9)	26.9 (−2.8)	37.3 (2.9)	48.6 (9.2)	58.3 (14.6)	62.5 (16.9)	61.2 (16.2)	53.1 (11.7)	42.2 (5.7)	32.8 (0.4)	24.7 (−4.1)	40.5 (4.7)
Mean minimum °F (°C)	−2.8 (−19.3)	0.0 (−17.8)	7.5 (−13.6)	22.9 (−5.1)	33.4 (0.8)	44.0 (6.7)	51.0 (10.6)	49.3 (9.6)	38.6 (3.7)	28.6 (−1.9)	18.9 (−7.3)	6.3 (−14.3)	−6.3 (−21.3)
Record low °F (°C)	−22 (−30)	−24 (−31)	−13 (−25)	3 (−16)	21 (−6)	32 (0)	41 (5)	39 (4)	27 (−3)	18 (−8)	−10 (−23)	−18 (−28)	−24 (−31)
Average precipitation inches (mm)	2.52 (64)	2.12 (54)	2.39 (61)	3.99 (101)	4.00 (102)	3.94 (100)	3.86 (98)	3.55 (90)	3.43 (87)	4.02 (102)	3.10 (79)	2.48 (63)	39.40 (1,001)
Average snowfall inches (cm)	22.6 (57)	17.2 (44)	7.6 (19)	2.0 (5.1)	0.0 (0.0)	0.0 (0.0)	0.0 (0.0)	0.0 (0.0)	0.0 (0.0)	0.3 (0.76)	7.1 (18)	20.8 (53)	77.6 (197)
Average extreme snow depth inches (cm)	9.0 (23)	8.8 (22)	5.7 (14)	1.0 (2.5)	0.0 (0.0)	0.0 (0.0)	0.0 (0.0)	0.0 (0.0)	0.0 (0.0)	0.1 (0.25)	2.5 (6.4)	6.3 (16)	12.1 (31)
Average precipitation days (≥ 0.01 in)	16.8	13.1	11.8	12.8	12.5	10.7	10.0	9.9	10.2	12.5	12.9	15.5	148.7
Average snowy days (≥ 0.1 in)	14.9	11.2	5.9	2.1	0.0	0.0	0.0	0.0	0.0	0.4	4.5	11.9	50.9
Average relative humidity (%)	77.2	74.2	71.1	66.8	65.4	68.1	69.6	73.3	76.1	74.6	76.9	79.5	72.7
Average dew point °F (°C)	16.3 (−8.7)	16.9 (−8.4)	24.8 (−4.0)	34.5 (1.4)	45.0 (7.2)	55.0 (12.8)	60.3 (15.7)	59.4 (15.2)	53.1 (11.7)	41.2 (5.1)	31.6 (−0.2)	21.7 (−5.7)	38.3 (3.5)
Mean monthly sunshine hours	88.3	116.0	168.2	210.2	255.9	286.8	296.5	264.2	206.0	152.4	82.0	62.1	2,188.6
Percentage possible sunshine	30	39	45	52	56	62	64	61	55	45	28	22	49
Source: NOAA (relative humidity, dew point, and sun 1961–1990)

Climate data for Lansing, Michigan (Capital Region Int'l), 1991−2020 normals, extremes 1863−present (Note: Official records for Lansing were kept in East Lansing from April 1863 to April 1948, Capital Region Int'l from May 1948 to July 1954, East Lansing again from August 1954 to April 1959, and again at Capital Region Int'l since May 1959. For more information, see ThreadEx.)
Month	Jan	Feb	Mar	Apr	May	Jun	Jul	Aug	Sep	Oct	Nov	Dec	Year
Record high °F (°C)	66 (19)	73 (23)	86 (30)	88 (31)	96 (36)	99 (37)	103 (39)	102 (39)	99 (37)	90 (32)	79 (26)	70 (21)	103 (39)
Mean maximum °F (°C)	51.7 (10.9)	52.6 (11.4)	68.2 (20.1)	78.2 (25.7)	85.4 (29.7)	91.4 (33.0)	92.3 (33.5)	91.3 (32.9)	87.8 (31.0)	79.1 (26.2)	65.4 (18.6)	54.4 (12.4)	94.3 (34.6)
Mean daily maximum °F (°C)	30.6 (−0.8)	33.5 (0.8)	44.4 (6.9)	57.6 (14.2)	69.4 (20.8)	78.9 (26.1)	82.8 (28.2)	80.6 (27.0)	73.6 (23.1)	60.5 (15.8)	47.0 (8.3)	35.7 (2.1)	57.9 (14.4)
Daily mean °F (°C)	23.9 (−4.5)	25.9 (−3.4)	35.2 (1.8)	47.0 (8.3)	58.4 (14.7)	68.0 (20.0)	71.8 (22.1)	70.0 (21.1)	62.5 (16.9)	50.8 (10.4)	39.5 (4.2)	29.5 (−1.4)	48.5 (9.2)
Mean daily minimum °F (°C)	17.2 (−8.2)	18.3 (−7.6)	26.0 (−3.3)	36.4 (2.4)	47.5 (8.6)	57.1 (13.9)	60.9 (16.1)	59.5 (15.3)	51.5 (10.8)	41.2 (5.1)	31.9 (−0.1)	23.3 (−4.8)	39.2 (4.0)
Mean minimum °F (°C)	−5.6 (−20.9)	−3.0 (−19.4)	5.3 (−14.8)	21.0 (−6.1)	31.2 (−0.4)	41.5 (5.3)	47.5 (8.6)	45.7 (7.6)	36.0 (2.2)	26.0 (−3.3)	15.9 (−8.9)	3.9 (−15.6)	−9.4 (−23.0)
Record low °F (°C)	−29 (−34)	−37 (−38)	−25 (−32)	−6 (−21)	19 (−7)	27 (−3)	31 (−1)	26 (−3)	19 (−7)	10 (−12)	−5 (−21)	−25 (−32)	−37 (−38)
Average precipitation inches (mm)	2.06 (52)	1.71 (43)	2.13 (54)	3.26 (83)	3.66 (93)	3.76 (96)	2.94 (75)	3.48 (88)	2.81 (71)	3.16 (80)	2.46 (62)	1.90 (48)	33.33 (847)
Average snowfall inches (cm)	14.3 (36)	12.9 (33)	5.9 (15)	1.7 (4.3)	0.0 (0.0)	0.0 (0.0)	0.0 (0.0)	0.0 (0.0)	0.0 (0.0)	0.2 (0.51)	3.9 (9.9)	11.3 (29)	50.2 (128)
Average extreme snow depth inches (cm)	8.0 (20)	7.6 (19)	5.0 (13)	1.1 (2.8)	0.0 (0.0)	0.0 (0.0)	0.0 (0.0)	0.0 (0.0)	0.0 (0.0)	0.0 (0.0)	2.5 (6.4)	5.4 (14)	10.3 (26)
Average precipitation days (≥ 0.01 in)	13.9	10.7	10.9	12.5	12.5	10.5	9.1	10.1	10.1	11.6	12.3	13.5	137.7
Average snowy days (≥ 0.1 in)	11.9	10.0	4.8	1.9	0.0	0.0	0.0	0.0	0.0	0.2	3.9	9.4	42.1
Average relative humidity (%)	78.8	76.2	73.3	67.6	66.7	69.0	71.0	74.9	77.5	76.1	78.6	81.1	74.2
Average dew point °F (°C)	16.0 (−8.9)	16.9 (−8.4)	25.3 (−3.7)	34.5 (1.4)	45.1 (7.3)	55.2 (12.9)	60.3 (15.7)	59.5 (15.3)	53.2 (11.8)	41.5 (5.3)	32.2 (0.1)	21.7 (−5.7)	38.4 (3.6)
Mean monthly sunshine hours	118.2	140.1	187.6	218.7	278.6	296.2	318.5	278.1	217.6	163.8	92.4	82.1	2,391.9
Percentage possible sunshine	40	47	51	54	61	65	69	65	58	48	32	29	54
Source: NOAA (relative humidity, dew point and sun 1961−1990)

Climate data for Marquette, Michigan (1991–2020 normals, extremes 1857–present)
Month	Jan	Feb	Mar	Apr	May	Jun	Jul	Aug	Sep	Oct	Nov	Dec	Year
Record high °F (°C)	57 (14)	69 (21)	82 (28)	91 (33)	100 (38)	101 (38)	108 (42)	102 (39)	98 (37)	89 (32)	74 (23)	60 (16)	108 (42)
Mean maximum °F (°C)	42.5 (5.8)	46.5 (8.1)	57.5 (14.2)	71.8 (22.1)	83.1 (28.4)	88.2 (31.2)	89.8 (32.1)	89.3 (31.8)	84.7 (29.3)	75.1 (23.9)	58.8 (14.9)	46.0 (7.8)	91.9 (33.3)
Mean daily maximum °F (°C)	24.6 (−4.1)	26.9 (−2.8)	35.3 (1.8)	45.8 (7.7)	58.7 (14.8)	67.9 (19.9)	74.6 (23.7)	74.3 (23.5)	67.3 (19.6)	53.9 (12.2)	40.6 (4.8)	30.2 (−1.0)	50.0 (10.0)
Daily mean °F (°C)	18.5 (−7.5)	19.7 (−6.8)	28.2 (−2.1)	38.4 (3.6)	49.8 (9.9)	59.0 (15.0)	66.2 (19.0)	66.2 (19.0)	59.4 (15.2)	47.0 (8.3)	34.5 (1.4)	24.4 (−4.2)	42.6 (5.9)
Mean daily minimum °F (°C)	12.4 (−10.9)	12.5 (−10.8)	21.0 (−6.1)	31.0 (−0.6)	40.8 (4.9)	50.1 (10.1)	57.7 (14.3)	58.1 (14.5)	51.6 (10.9)	40.0 (4.4)	28.5 (−1.9)	18.6 (−7.4)	35.2 (1.8)
Mean minimum °F (°C)	−3.5 (−19.7)	−2.4 (−19.1)	5.3 (−14.8)	20.5 (−6.4)	31.2 (−0.4)	39.8 (4.3)	48.7 (9.3)	49.2 (9.6)	39.8 (4.3)	30.1 (−1.1)	16.3 (−8.7)	2.7 (−16.3)	−8 (−22)
Record low °F (°C)	−27 (−33)	−33 (−36)	−19 (−28)	3 (−16)	16 (−9)	29 (−2)	36 (2)	33 (1)	28 (−2)	13 (−11)	−9 (−23)	−20 (−29)	−33 (−36)
Average precipitation inches (mm)	1.86 (47)	1.47 (37)	1.59 (40)	2.74 (70)	2.90 (74)	3.05 (77)	3.11 (79)	2.31 (59)	3.34 (85)	3.43 (87)	2.42 (61)	1.98 (50)	30.20 (767)
Average snowfall inches (cm)	25.1 (64)	20.9 (53)	14.2 (36)	8.4 (21)	0.3 (0.76)	0.0 (0.0)	0.0 (0.0)	0.0 (0.0)	0.0 (0.0)	0.9 (2.3)	11.1 (28)	21.1 (54)	102.0 (259)
Average extreme snow depth inches (cm)	25.2 (64)	31.7 (81)	32.6 (83)	19.3 (49)	1.5 (3.8)	0.0 (0.0)	0.0 (0.0)	0.0 (0.0)	0.0 (0.0)	2.5 (6.4)	9.1 (23)	17.9 (45)	36.1 (92)
Average precipitation days (≥ 0.01 in)	17.7	12.2	10.8	10.4	11.8	11.8	11.3	11.0	12.9	14.6	13.4	14.4	152.3
Average snowy days (≥ 0.1 in)	17.7	12.5	8.9	4.5	0.2	0.0	0.0	0.0	0.0	0.6	7.7	12.5	64.6
Mean monthly sunshine hours	105.5	128.8	181.3	225.3	278.8	289.7	322.8	270.6	191.5	140.6	80.7	78.2	2,293.8
Percentage possible sunshine	38	45	49	55	60	61	68	62	51	42	29	29	51
Source: NOAA (sun 1961–1990)

Climate data for Sault Ste. Marie, Michigan (Sault Ste. Marie Municipal Airport) 1991–2020 normals, (Note: Mean monthly maxima and minima (i.e. the highest and lowest temperature readings during an entire month or year) calculated based on data at said location from 1991 to 2020.) extremes 1888–present
Month	Jan	Feb	Mar	Apr	May	Jun	Jul	Aug	Sep	Oct	Nov	Dec	Year
Record high °F (°C)	48 (9)	50 (10)	83 (28)	85 (29)	91 (33)	93 (34)	98 (37)	98 (37)	95 (35)	83 (28)	74 (23)	62 (17)	98 (37)
Mean maximum °F (°C)	39.3 (4.1)	41.9 (5.5)	52.5 (11.4)	67.5 (19.7)	81.8 (27.7)	85.6 (29.8)	87.7 (30.9)	86.6 (30.3)	81.6 (27.6)	71.8 (22.1)	56.4 (13.6)	44.5 (6.9)	89.4 (31.9)
Mean daily maximum °F (°C)	24.0 (−4.4)	26.4 (−3.1)	35.5 (1.9)	48.5 (9.2)	63.2 (17.3)	72.5 (22.5)	76.8 (24.9)	75.8 (24.3)	68.0 (20.0)	54.1 (12.3)	41.2 (5.1)	30.5 (−0.8)	51.4 (10.8)
Daily mean °F (°C)	16.2 (−8.8)	17.8 (−7.9)	26.7 (−2.9)	39.4 (4.1)	52.1 (11.2)	61.1 (16.2)	66.0 (18.9)	65.6 (18.7)	58.4 (14.7)	46.3 (7.9)	34.8 (1.6)	23.8 (−4.6)	42.4 (5.8)
Mean daily minimum °F (°C)	8.4 (−13.1)	9.3 (−12.6)	17.9 (−7.8)	30.2 (−1.0)	41.0 (5.0)	49.7 (9.8)	55.2 (12.9)	55.4 (13.0)	48.7 (9.3)	38.5 (3.6)	28.3 (−2.1)	17.1 (−8.3)	33.3 (0.7)
Mean minimum °F (°C)	−14.0 (−25.6)	−11.1 (−23.9)	−4.4 (−20.2)	15.9 (−8.9)	29.8 (−1.2)	37.4 (3.0)	45.0 (7.2)	45.0 (7.2)	35.5 (1.9)	26.7 (−2.9)	10.4 (−12.0)	−5.1 (−20.6)	−17.6 (−27.6)
Record low °F (°C)	−36 (−38)	−37 (−38)	−28 (−33)	−13 (−25)	18 (−8)	26 (−3)	36 (2)	29 (−2)	25 (−4)	15 (−9)	−12 (−24)	−31 (−35)	−37 (−38)
Average precipitation inches (mm)	2.21 (56)	1.51 (38)	1.81 (46)	2.63 (67)	2.64 (67)	2.85 (72)	3.07 (78)	3.19 (81)	3.93 (100)	4.38 (111)	3.44 (87)	2.80 (71)	34.46 (875)
Average snowfall inches (cm)	30.3 (77)	20.7 (53)	13.0 (33)	7.6 (19)	0.4 (1.0)	0.0 (0.0)	0.0 (0.0)	0.0 (0.0)	0.0 (0.0)	1.7 (4.3)	16.0 (41)	30.4 (77)	120.1 (305)
Average precipitation days (≥ 0.01 in)	18.5	13.5	12.3	11.7	11.2	11.1	11.3	10.6	13.1	16.5	16.5	18.6	164.9
Average snowy days (≥ 0.1 in)	19.6	15.5	10.4	5.5	0.5	0.0	0.0	0.0	0.1	2.0	10.3	17.4	81.3
Average relative humidity (%)	77.2	75.2	74.7	69.9	67.9	74.7	76.3	79.6	81.6	80.4	81.7	81.0	76.7
Average dew point °F (°C)	7.5 (−13.6)	8.2 (−13.2)	17.2 (−8.2)	28.2 (−2.1)	38.7 (3.7)	49.3 (9.6)	55.6 (13.1)	55.6 (13.1)	48.6 (9.2)	38.3 (3.5)	27.3 (−2.6)	14.7 (−9.6)	32.4 (0.2)
Mean monthly sunshine hours	104.9	142.5	206.4	227.5	280.3	281.2	303.6	248.9	172.9	122.6	70.4	77.4	2,238.6
Percentage possible sunshine	37	49	56	56	60	59	64	57	46	36	25	29	50
Source: NOAA (relative humidity, dew point, and sun 1961–1990)

== Geology ==
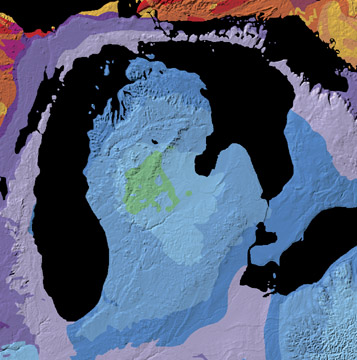
Geologic map of the Michigan Basin.

The geological formation of the state is greatly varied. Primary boulders are found over the entire surface of the Upper Peninsula (being principally of primitive origin), while Secondary deposits cover the entire Lower Peninsula. The Upper Peninsula exhibits Lower Silurian sandstones, limestones, copper and iron bearing rocks, corresponding to the Huronian system of Canada. The central portion of the Lower Peninsula contains coal measures and rocks of the Permo-Carboniferous period. Devonian and sub-Carboniferous deposits are scattered over the entire state.

The soil is of a varied composition and in large areas is very fertile, especially in the south. However, the Upper Peninsula for the most part is rocky and mountainous, and the soil is unsuitable for agriculture. The climate is tempered by the proximity of the lakes and is much milder than in other locales with the same latitude.

== Ecology ==
The principal forest trees include basswood, maple, elm, sassafras, butternut, walnut, poplar, hickory, oak, willow, pine, birch, beech, hemlock, witchhazel, tamarack, cedar, locust, dogwood, and ash.
