= Brier Hill (disambiguation) =

Brier Hill is a neighborhood in Youngstown, Ohio, U.S.

Brier Hill may also refer to:

- Brier Hill, Pennsylvania, an unincorporated community
  - Brier Hill (Brier Hill, Pennsylvania), a national historic district
- Brier Hill, Ontario, Leeds and the Thousand Islands

== See also ==
- Brier (disambiguation), also Briar
- Briar Hill (disambiguation)
