= Greenbriar =

Greenbriar may refer to:

- Smilax, a plant genus commonly called greenbriar

== Places ==
- Greenwood/Greenbriar, Calgary, Alberta, Canada
- Greenbriar, Florida, U.S.
- Greenbriar, Atlanta, Georgia, U.S.
  - Greenbriar Mall
- Greenbriar Lake, Texas, U.S.

== See also ==
- Brier (disambiguation)
- Greenbrier (disambiguation)
- The Greenbriar Boys, bluegrass band
