= Brière (disambiguation) =

Brière is the marsh area to the north of the Loire estuary in France at its mouth on the Atlantic Ocean.

Brière may also refer to:

== Places ==
- Brière Regional Natural Park, a protected area in the Pays de la Loire region of France
- Saint-Maclou-la-Brière, a commune in the Seine-Maritime, Normandy, France
- Saint-Mars-la-Brière, a commune in the Sarthe department, Pays de la Loire, France

== People ==
- Alexandre Jacques François Brière de Boismont (1797–1881), French physician
- Daniel Brière (born 1977), Canadian former professional ice hockey player and executive
- Denis Brière, Canadian forestry professor and academic administrator
- Élisabeth Brière (born 1968), Canadian Liberal politician
- Gaston Brière (1871–1962), French art historian and head curator
- Henri Brière (1873–1957), French politician
- Léo Brière, French mentalist and illusionist
- Louis Brière de l'Isle (1827–1896), French Army general
- Michel Brière (1949–1971), Canadian professional ice hockey player
- Michael Briere, Canadian software developer who was condemned for the abduction and murder of Holly Maria Jones
- Murat Brierre (1938–1988), Haitian metal sculptor
- Yves de La Brière (1877–1941), French Jesuit theologian and author

== Other uses ==
- La Brière, a 1923 novel by Alphonse de Chateaubriant
- Michel Brière Memorial Trophy, a player award in the Quebec Major Junior Hockey League

== See also ==
- Brier (disambiguation)
- Briers (disambiguation)
