= Manistee National Forest =

National forest in Michigan, US

- IUCN category VI (protected area with sustainable use of natural resources)
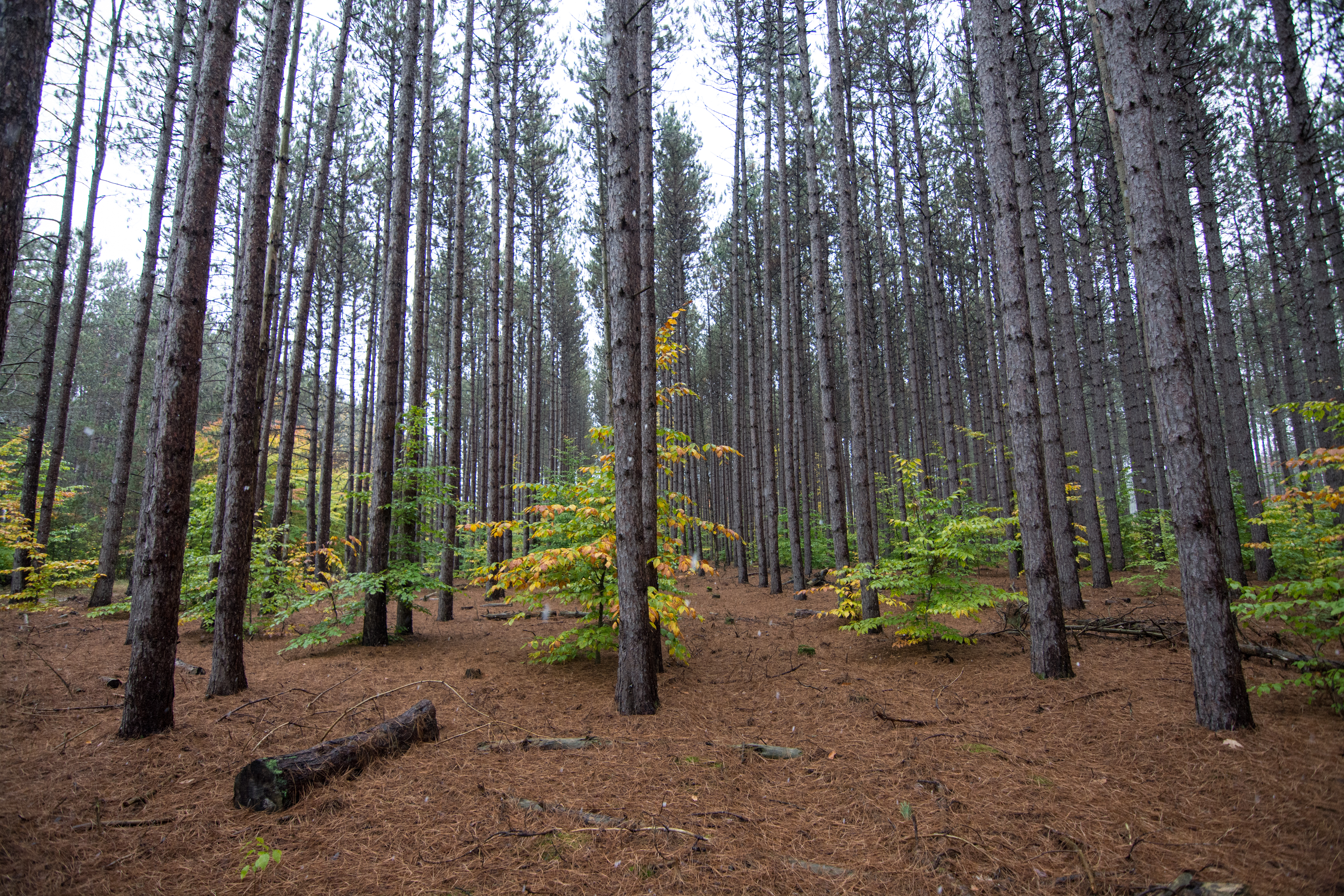
- Red Pine plantation in the Manistee National Forest

- Map showing National Forests in Michigan
- Location: Lower Peninsula, Michigan
- Coordinates: 43.85°N 85.95°W
- Area: Total - 978,906 acres (3,960 km^{2}); Huron - 438,584 acres (1,770 km^{2}); Manistee - 540,322 acres (2,190 km^{2})
- Established: 1938
- Governing body: U.S. Forest Service
- Website: Huron-Manistee National Forests

The Manistee National Forest is a national forest located in the Lower Peninsula of Michigan. It has a total area of 540,187 acres (2,190 km^{2}). It was established in 1938, and combined with the Huron National Forest in 1945 for administrative purposes, creating the Huron-Manistee National Forests. However, they are two separate forest units, as they are not connected. The area is popular for hiking, fishing, camping, boating, snowmobiling, cross-country skiing and hunting. The North Country Trail passes through it, and connects with the 11-mile Manistee River Trail to form a 23-mile loop. The highest point in the lower peninsula, Briar Hill (1,706 ft), is located here. The Manistee National Forest is not one continuous mass, but is a "mosaic" broken by private property and towns. The headquarters for the forest is in Cadillac, Michigan.

== History ==
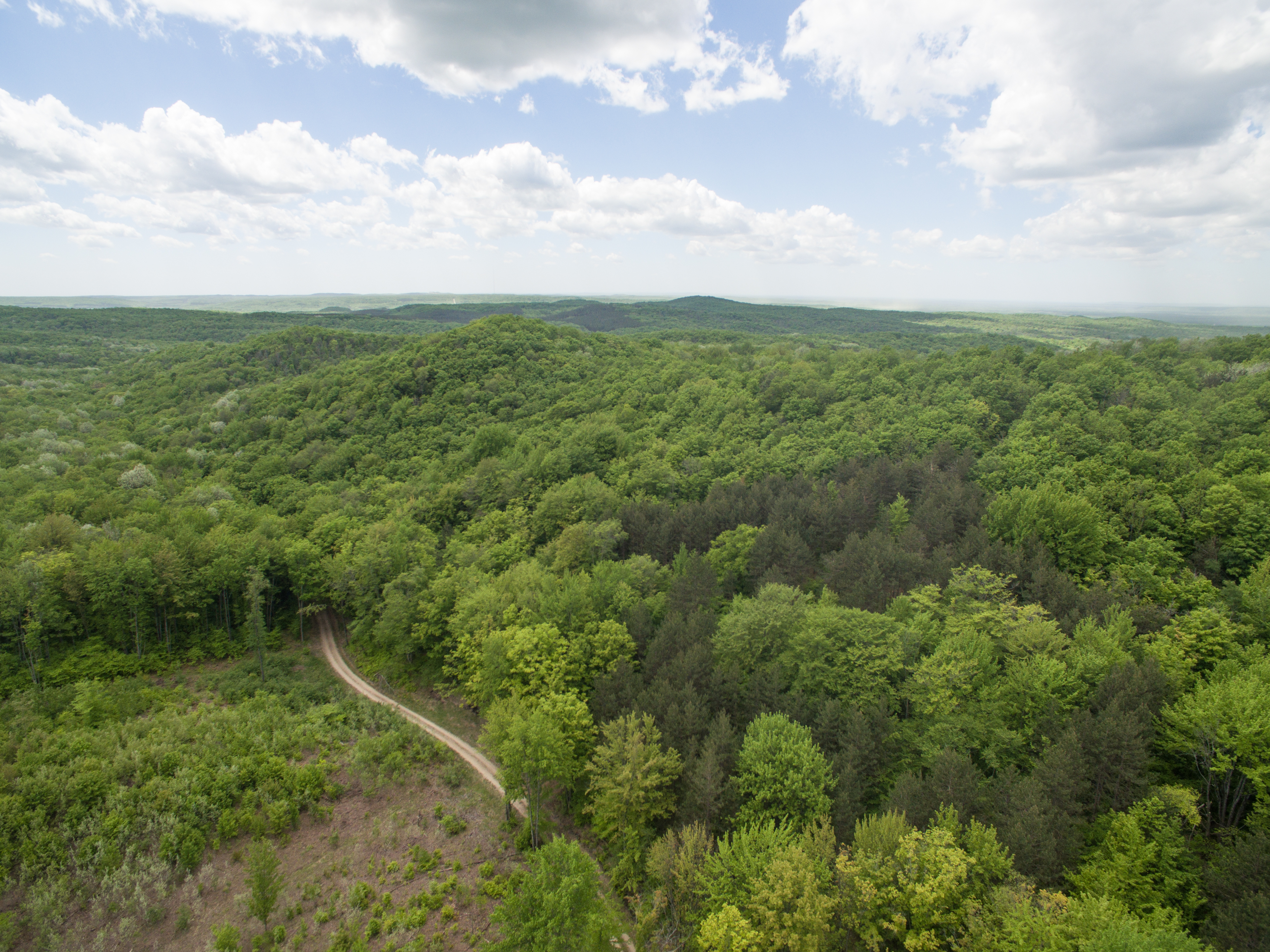
A United States Forest Service (USFS) road near Briar Hill

Unique among National Forests in its creation, the Manistee National Forest was created from tax-forfeited lands and purchases after the logging era had ended. The large areas of cutover timber were not very suitable for farming, and much of the burned over forest land had still not yet regenerated to trees by the 1930s.

Around the 1920s when reforestation and conservation was taking off in Michigan, there was a movement across the United States for the conservation of the remaining forests and wildlife, including on the federal level under the leadership of President Theodore Roosevelt. In 1938, President Franklin D. Roosevelt established the Manistee National Forest. One of his primary goals was to replant the cutover areas, which was done by his recently created Civilian Conservation Corps, which employed young men during the Great Depression and was responsible for replanting most of Michigan's barren lands.

== Geography ==
The terrain is mostly forest underlain by sedimentary rocks, covered by a mantle of glacial drift as much as 1,000 feet (300 m) thick. Glacial moraines, outwash plains, deltas, lacustrine deposits, and old shorelines are common. Soils originating from these landscapes are predominately sand. Aquifers within glacial deposits are common and feed thousands of miles of cold water streams at a relatively constant rate throughout the year.

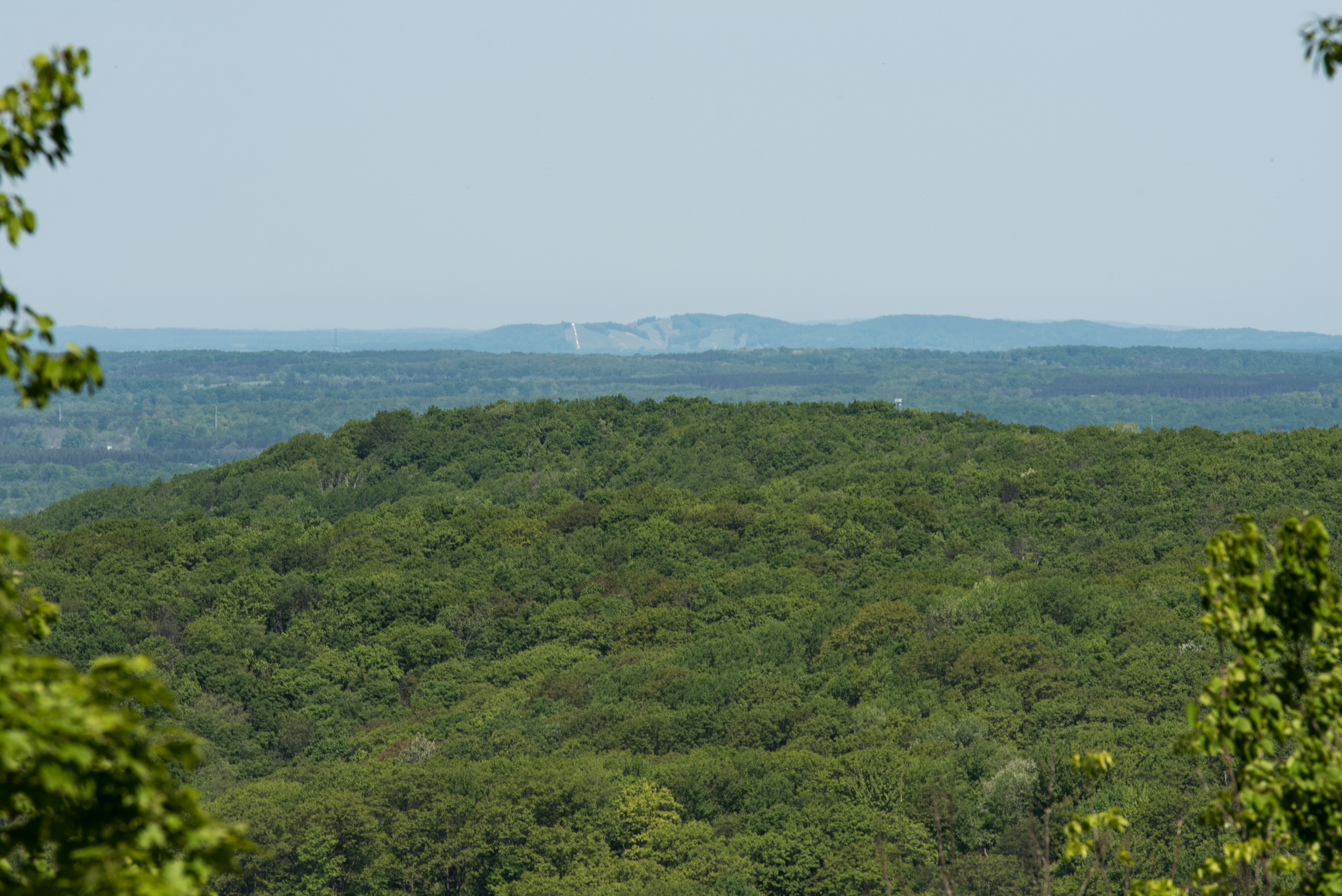
A scenic overlook atop a hill in the Manistee National Forest

The forest consists of a mix of hardwoods and pines, with red pine (Pinus resinosa) as the most dominant species. A common feature of all Michigan National Forests are the large straight rows of planted red pines, which were planted by the Civilian Conservation Corps in the 1930s. Today many are over 75 ft (23 m) tall and constitute a significant source of revenue from timber sales. The largest contiguous red pine plantation in North America is in the Manistee National Forest, called the Kellog Plantation.

In descending order of land area the Manistee National Forest lies in parts of Lake, Newaygo, Wexford, Manistee, Mason, Oceana, Muskegon, Mecosta, and Montcalm counties. There are local ranger district offices located in Baldwin and Manistee.

The Lumberjack 100, a 100-mile ultra-endurance mountain bike race is held annually within its bounds.

Dispersed camping is free on National Forest lands, as long as one follows the guidelines found on the USFS website. However, some rustic campgrounds do require a reservation or camping fee. A wood permit is required to cut firewood. Wood permits are valid for the Manistee National Forest only, and exclude the Huron National Forest.

== Features ==
The Nordhouse Dunes Wilderness is a unique feature of the Manistee National Forest. This relatively small area of 3,450 acres (14 km^{2}), situated on the east shore of Lake Michigan is one of the few wilderness areas in the U.S. with an extensive lake shore dunes ecosystem. Most of the dunes are 3500 to 4000 years old and some stand about 140 feet (43 m) higher than the lake. The Nordhouse Dunes are interspersed with woody vegetation such as juniper, jack pine and hemlock. There are many small water holes and marshes dotting the landscape and dune grass covers many of the dunes. The beach is wide and sandy.

Briar Hill is the second highest point in the Lower Peninsula of Michigan, at 1,706 ft (520 m). It is of glacial origin and consists of mostly second growth hardwoods. There are no marked trails to the summit, which provides limited views of the surrounding area. The footings of the old steel firetower still remain, as well as a USGS survey marker, in which it misspells the hill as "Brier Hill".

Caberfae Peaks Ski & Golf Resort is located in the Manistee National Forest, in the Caberfae Hills region that receives large amounts of lake-effect snow. The official opening was in January 1938, making it one of the oldest ski resorts in the US.

Several rivers flow through its boundaries, most notably the Manistee, Pere-Marquette, Pine, Muskegon, and the Little Manistee. These were important for transporting logs to the mills during the lumber boom, and now serve as popular destinations for canoeing, fishing, hunting, and hiking.

Among the many areas to hike is a 23-mile loop trail, which is formed with the Manistee River Trail and the North Country Scenic Trail. This loop can be accessed from the Red Bridge and Seaton Creek accesses (Manistee River Trail) and the Marilla and Upper River Road Trailheads (North Country Scenic Trail). Many backpackers plan 2–3 days to hike the complete loop, setting up backcountry campsites overnight.

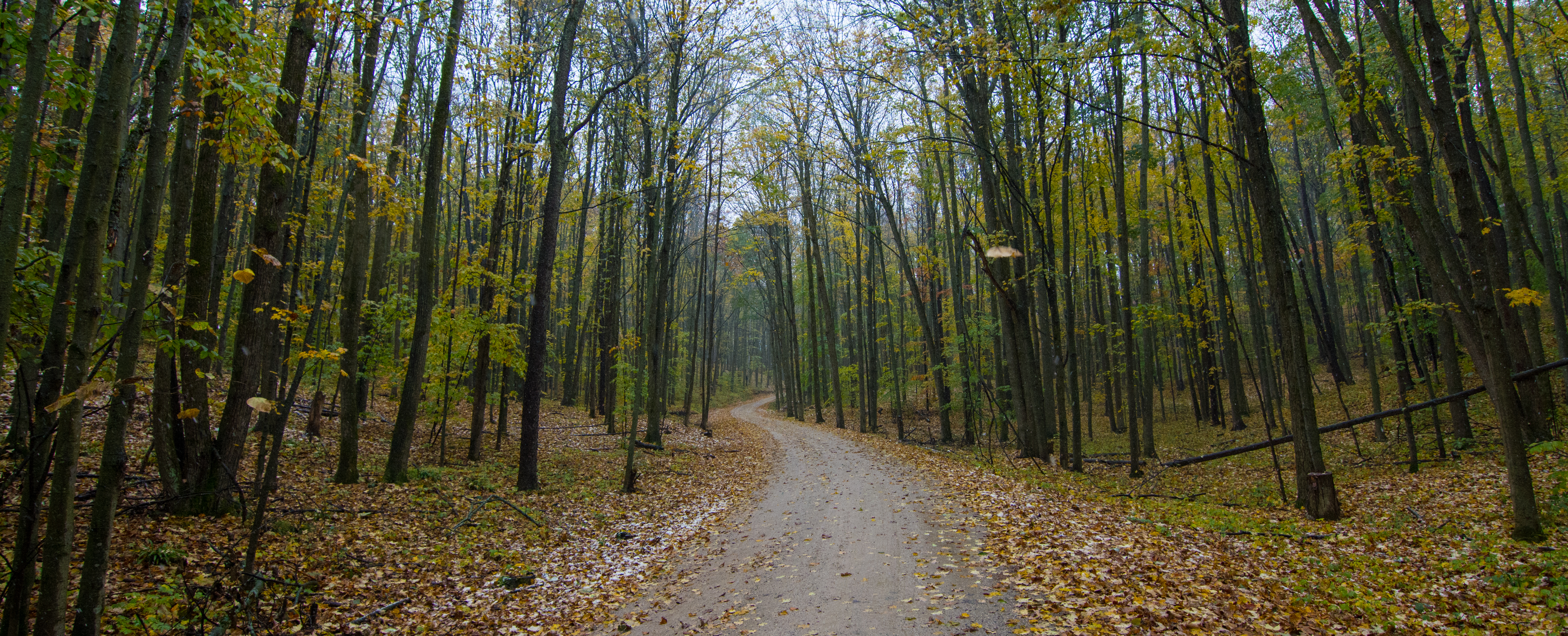
The Manistee National Forest consists of a mix of hardwoods and pine.
