= Briar Hill =

Briar Hill may refer to the following places:

- Briar Hill, Victoria, Australia
- Hounsfield Heights/Briar Hill, Calgary, Alberta, Canada
- Briar Hill, Michigan, ghost town
- Briar Hill (Michigan), the highest point in the Lower Peninsula of Michigan, U.S.
- Briar Hill, Northamptonshire, England
- Briar Hill–Belgravia, Fairbank, Toronto, Canada

== See also ==
- Brier Hill (disambiguation)
- Briarhills, Houston, Texas, U.S.
