= Walter F. Pudlowski Jr. =

US Army major general

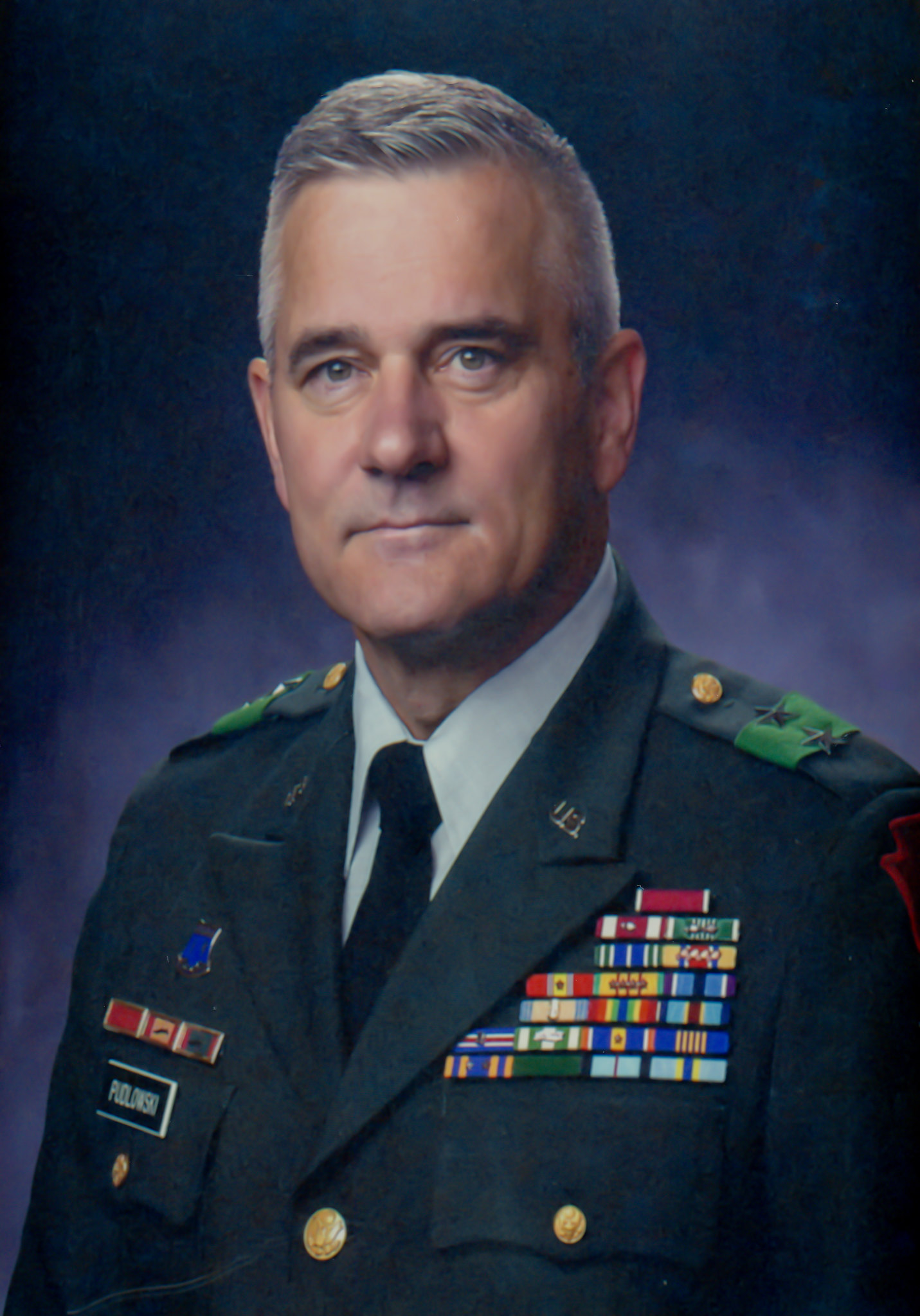
- Pudlowski as commander of the 28th Infantry Division, c. 1999
- Born: October 10, 1945 (age 81); Uniontown, Pennsylvania, US
- Alma mater: Pennsylvania State University; United States Army Command and General Staff College; Industrial College of the Armed Forces; United States Army War College
- Spouse: Helen Elizabeth Tuttle (m. 1967)
- Children: 3
- Military career
- Service: United States Army; Pennsylvania Army National Guard
- Service years: 1965–2005
- Rank: Major General
- Units: U.S. Army Transportation Corps; U.S. Army Infantry Branch
- Commands: 28th Infantry Division
- Wars: Vietnam War
- Awards: Army Distinguished Service Medal; Legion of Merit; Complete List

Walter F. Pudlowski Jr. (born 10 October 1945) is a retired United States Army officer. A longtime member of the Pennsylvania Army National Guard, he attained the rank of major general and served as commander of the 28th Infantry Division, as well as in senior staff positions at the National Guard Bureau. A veteran of the Vietnam War, Pudlowski served from 1965 until retiring in 2005, and his awards and decorations included the Army Distinguished Service Medal and Legion of Merit.

Pudlowski was born in Uniontown, Pennsylvania and raised and educated in Brier Hill and Cardale. In 1965, he joined the United States Army; selected for officer training, he received his commission in second lieutenant in 1966. He served in South Vietnam during the Vietnam War in 1967 and 1968. Pudlowski subsequently served in Panama, and he left active duty in 1972. He served in the United States Army Reserve until 1975, when he became a member of the Pennsylvania Army National Guard. Pudlowski advanced through staff positions at the battalion and brigade level, and in 1989 he became chief of staff of the 28th Infantry Division.

In 1993, Pudlowski became the 28th Division's assistant division commander and received promotion to brigadier general. In October 1998, he was assigned as division commander, and in October 1999 he received promotion to major general. From October 2003 until his October 2005 retirement, Pudlowski served in senior staff assignments at the National Guard Bureau.

== Early life ==
Walter F. Pudlowski Jr. was born in Uniontown, Pennsylvania on 10 October 1945, the son of Walter F. Pudlowski Sr. and Irene (Brosovich) Pudlowski. He was raised and educated in Brier Hill and Cardale, and was a 1963 graduate of Redstone High School in Republic.

On 1 October 1965, Pudlowski enlisted in the United States Army and completed initial training at Fort Jackson. Selected to attend Officer Candidate School at Fort Knox, Kentucky, he received his commission as a Transportation Corps second lieutenant in September 1966. His initial assignment was at Fort Dix, New Jersey, where he served as training officer and executive officer of Company Y, 2d Basic Combat Training Brigade.

== Start of career ==
In August 1967, Pudlowski deployed to South Vietnam for Vietnam War duty. He served as a platoon leader in the 264th Transportation Company, and he received promotion to first lieutenant in September 1967. He returned to the United States in August 1968 and was promoted to captain in September. Pudlowski was an operations and training officer on the staff of First United States Army at Fort Meade, Maryland until June 1970. He was then transferred to Panama, where he served as logistics management officer for the U.S. Army Tropic Test Center at Fort Clayton. He completed his regular army service in May 1972 and was transferred to the United States Army Reserve Control Group.

In September 1972, Pudlowski joined the 1036th U.S. Army Reserve School in Farrell, Pennsylvania, where he served until March 1975, when he became a member of the Pennsylvania Army National Guard. In 1974, he received his Bachelor of Science degree in human development from Pennsylvania State University. Assigned initially as assistant plans, operations and training officer (S-3 Air) of the Pennsylvania Guard's 2nd Battalion, 109th Infantry Regiment in Scranton, he served in this position until January 1979. In February 1979, Pudlowski was promoted to major and assigned as S-3 of the 55th Infantry Brigade, which was also headquartered in Scranton.

=== Military education ===
The military education Pudlowski completed during his career included:

- Transportation Officer Basic Course
- Infantry Officer Advanced Course
- United States Army Command and General Staff College
- Industrial College of the Armed Forces
- United States Army War College

== Continued career ==
From January 1982 to August 1983, Pudlowski served as executive officer and second-in command of 1st Battalion, 109th Infantry Regiment in Scranton. He was then reassigned as the 55th Brigade's S-3. In April 1985, he was promoted to lieutenant colonel and assigned as the 55th brigade's executive officer. From January 1986 to November 1989, Pudlowski served as plans, operations, and training officer (G-3) on the staff of the 28th Infantry Division in Harrisburg. In December 1989, he was promoted to colonel and appointed the division's chief of staff.

Pudlowski was promoted to brigadier general in November 1993, with assignment as the 28th Division's assistant division commander, and he held this post until October 1998. He was then assigned to command the division, and he received promotion to major general in October 1999. He served as division commander until October 2003, when he was appointed as director of military support and homeland defense in the National Guard Bureau's plans, training, and operations directorate (J-3). In July 2004, he was assigned as a special assistant to the director of the Army National Guard, and he served in this position until retiring in October 2005. In retirement, Pudlowski was a resident of Grantville. His activities included service as president of the Pennsylvania Military Museum's board of directors, member of the board of directors of the Pennsylvania National Guard Education Fund, and member of the Pennsylvania National Guard Association's board of directors. He was also president and a director of the Dauphin County Hero's Grove Committee.

== Awards ==
Pudlowski's federal awards and decorations include:

- Army Distinguished Service Medal with oak leaf cluster
- Legion of Merit with oak leaf cluster
- Meritorious Service Medal with 1 silver oak leaf cluster
- Army Commendation Medal with 1 silver oak leaf cluster and 1 bronze oak leaf cluster
- Army Achievement Medal with 1 bronze oak leaf cluster
- Army Reserve Component Achievement Medal with 1 silver oak leaf cluster and 4 bronze oak leaf clusters and additional ribbon bar
- Global War on Terrorism Service Medal
- National Defense Service Medal with 2 bronze service stars
- Vietnam Service Medal with 4 bronze service stars
- Humanitarian Service Medal
- Armed Forces Reserve Medal with 1 gold hourglass device
- Army Service Ribbon
- Overseas Service Ribbon
- Army Reserve Components Overseas Training Ribbon with numeral 3
- Republic of Vietnam Campaign Medal with 60 device
- Vietnam Civic Action Unit Award

Pudlowski's state awards included the Pennsylvania Distinguished Service Medal, Pennsylvania Meritorious Service Medal and Pennsylvania Commendation Medal. He was also a recipient of the Association of the United States Army's Lieutenant General Raymond S. McLain Medal, the National Infantry Association's Order of Saint Maurice, and the Armor and Cavalry Association's Order of Saint George. In 2018, he was inducted into the Pennsylvania Department of Military and Veterans Affairs Hall of Fame.

== Effective dates of promotion ==
Pudlowski's dates of promotion were:

- Major General, 1 October 1999
- Brigadier General, 24 November 1993
- Colonel, 13 December 1989
- Lieutenant Colonel, 15 April 1985
- Major, 21 February 1979
- Captain, 13 September 1968
- First Lieutenant, 13 September 1967
- Second Lieutenant, 13 September 1966
