= Association of the United States Army =

American non-profit organization

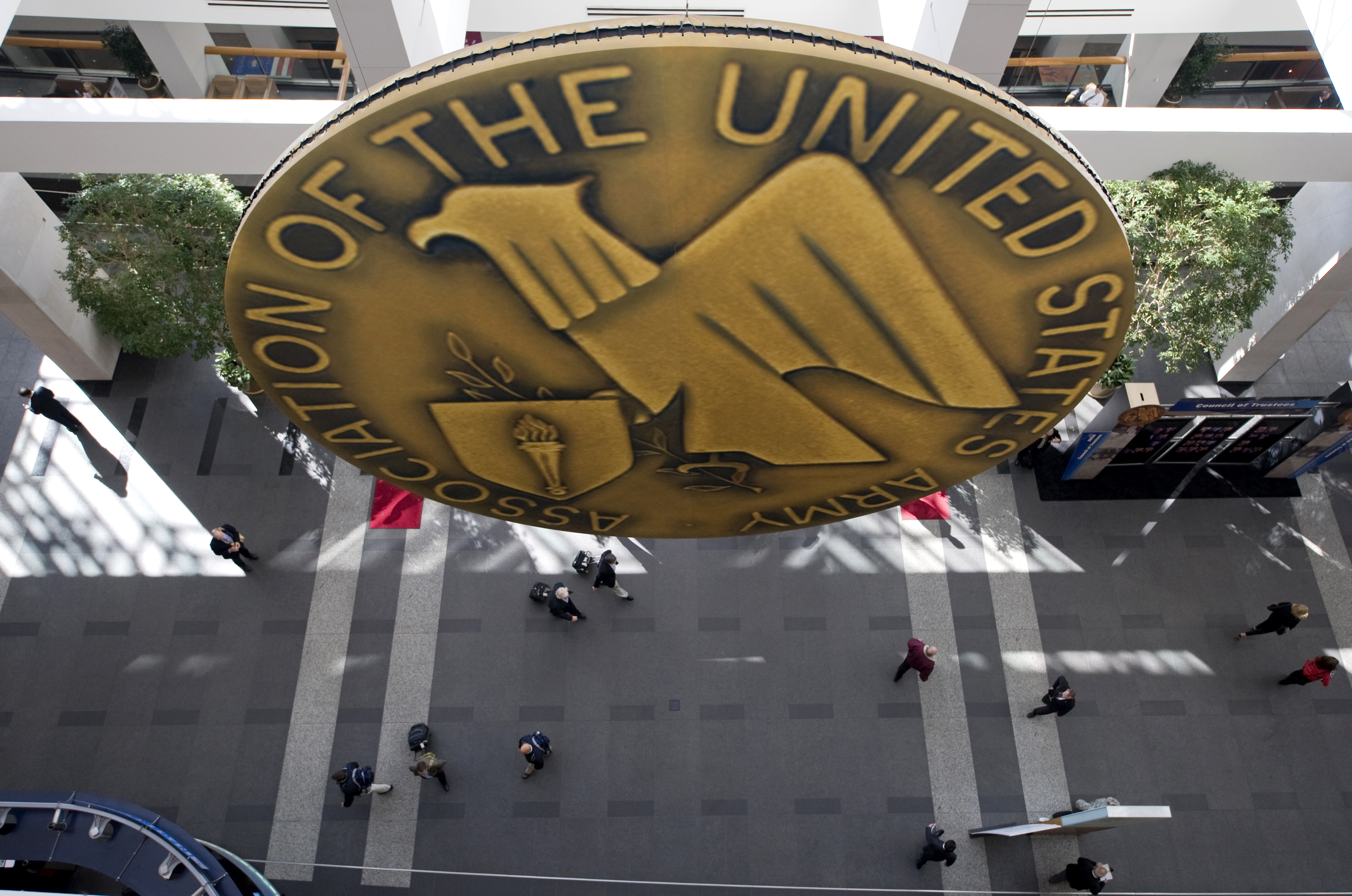
- Nickname: AUSA
- Formation: 5 July 1950; 76 years ago
- Type: 501(c)(3) Nonprofit
- Tax ID no.: 53-0193361
- Purpose: Professional Societies, Associations (Public, Society Benefit — Multipurpose and Other)
- Headquarters: 2425 Wilson Blvd.
- Location: Arlington, Virginia, 22201, United States
- Key people: Robert Brooks Brown; Phebe Novakovic; Leslie C. Smith; John F. Haley; Daniel A. Dailey
- Revenue: US$27,615,070 (2020)
- Expenses: US$23,683,352 (2020)
- Website: www.ausa.org

The Association of the United States Army (AUSA) is a private, non-profit organization that serves as the professional association of the United States Army. Founded in 1950, it has 121 chapters worldwide. Membership is open to everyone, not just Army personnel, nor is membership mandatory for soldiers. The organization publishes ARMY Magazine and the Green Book. The current president is retired Army general Robert Brooks Brown.

== Membership ==
ARMY Magazine
- Format: Monthly
- Publisher: Association of the United States Army
- First issue: 1956 (70 years ago)
- Language: English
- Website: www.ausa.org/publications/army-magazine
- ISSN: 0004-2455
- OCLC: 924449811

Membership in AUSA is not just open to all Army ranks and all components are represented—including Regular Army, National Guard, Army Reserve, Government Civilians, Retirees, Wounded Warriors, Veterans but to concerned citizens and family members. AUSA welcomes anyone who subscribes to the philosophy of a strong national defense with special concern for the Army. Community businesses and defense industry companies are also vital and contributing members of AUSA. Other membership categories include Community Partners and National Partners (for defense industry businesses). Membership in AUSA includes a subscription to ARMY Magazine received monthly, including the Green Book, which is published in October of each year. The Green Book is an almanac of articles from Army leadership and reference information about America's Army worldwide. Members also receive AUSA Extra a weekly digital newspaper featuring the latest news about the Army and the association.

== Conference ==
The AUSA Annual Meeting & Exposition is held each year in the Washington DC Metro area.

Daniel P. Driscoll, the United States Secretary of the Army, announced that in 2025, the United States Army has partnered with Y Combinator to bring in small companies to the conference and host a pitch-style competition to drive innovation.

== Chapters ==
AUSA has 121 chapters worldwide, which develop programs and activities that provide community support for the US Army through individual and corporate members. Chapters serve as the liaison between the Army and local civilian communities. Typical chapter activities include general membership meetings with high-profile guest speakers, community involvement events and special events honoring the Army and outstanding soldiers.

== Awards ==
The Association of the United States Army presents a number of soldiers, civil servants, and volunteers with national awards at its Annual Meeting. In addition, local chapters also give a variety of awards to local soldiers, Army civilians, and volunteers, as well as managing scholarships programs benefiting local students and soldiers.

=== General George Catlett Marshall Medal ===
Established in 1960, the George Catlett Marshall Medal is AUSA's highest honor, and is awarded annually for selfless service to the United States. Past recipients include Colin Powell, Madeleine Albright, Kenneth Fisher, and George H. W. Bush.

=== General Creighton W. Abrams Medal ===
Established in 1965, the General Creighton W. Abrams Medal is awarded annually to the individual or group who has done the most to foster the advancement of the United States Army during the past year. Past recipients include Daniel Inouye, William E. DePuy, and the Arlington Ladies.

=== Major General Anthony J. Drexel Biddle Medal ===
The Major General Anthony J. Drexel Biddle Medal is awarded annually to the individual who has contributed most significantly to AUSA's mission over the previous year, often honoring AUSA's most diligent volunteers. Past recipients include Julius W. Becton Jr., Paik Sun-yup, and William G. Bainbridge.

=== Sergeant Major of the Army William G. Bainbridge Medal ===
Established in 2000, the Sergeant Major of the Army William G. Bainbridge Medal is awarded annually to the noncommissioned officer contributing most to the United States Army Noncommissioned Officer Corps. Past recipients include SGM David G. Martinez, CSM Andrew McFowler, and Richard A. Kidd.

=== John W. Dixon Award ===
The John W. Dixon Award, established in 1989, is presented annually for distinguished service in the industrial community resulting in outstanding contributions to national defense. Past recipients include Linda Hudson, Marillyn Hewson, and Norman R. Augustine.

=== Major General James Earl Rudder Medal ===
The Major General James Early Rudder Medal is given to a current or former member of the U.S. Army Reserve for advancing a seamless and component-integrated Army. Past recipients include Jeffrey W. Talley, Jack C. Stultz, and Marcia Anderson.

=== Lieutenant General Raymond S. McClain Medal ===
The Lieutenant General Raymond S. McLain Medal given to a current or former member of the National Guard for advancing a seamless and component-integrated Army. Past recipients include Roger C. Schultz, Gus Hargett, Ansel M. Stroud, Walter F. Pudlowski Jr., and Raymond F. Rees.

== See also ==
- Air & Space Forces Association
- Space Force Association
- Marine Corps Association
- United States Naval Institute
- Coast Guard Foundation
