= Briers =

Briers is a surname. Notable people with the surname include:

- Lee Briers (born 1978), Welsh rugby league player
- Lucy Briers (born 1967), English actress
- Mark Briers (born 1968), former English cricketer
- Nigel Briers (born 1955), former English cricketer
- Norman Briers (born 1947), former English cricketer
- Richard Briers (1934–2013), English actor

== See also ==
- Brier (surname)
