= Blackbriar =

Blackbriar may refer to:

- Blackbriar (band), a Dutch music group
- Blackbriar (novel), by William Sleator, 1972
- Blackbriar Thorn, a DC Comics character
- Project Blackbriar, a plot element in the Bourne film series

== See also ==
- Brier (disambiguation)
