= Briar Rose =

Briar Rose may refer to:

== Folklore ==
- "Little Briar Rose", also called "Sleeping Beauty", a folk tale originally published by Charles Perrault and later by the Brothers Grimm

== Characters ==
- Briar Rose, a pseudonym used by Princess Aurora in Walt Disney's 1959 film Sleeping Beauty
- Briar Rose, a character in Fables, a comic book series by Bill Willingham
- Briar Rose, a non-player character from the RPG Fable: The Lost Chapters, developed by Big Blue Box
- Briar Rose, a pseudonym used by Princess Raisa in The Seven Realms series of novels by Cinda Williams Chima
- Briar Rose (Ibara), a character in the anime show Otogi-Jushi Akazukin
- Briar Rose, Aurora's mother's name in the TV show Once Upon a Time
- Briar Rose, a character portrayed by India Eisley in the 2016 film, The Curse of Sleeping Beauty

== Literature ==
- Briar Rose (novel), a 1992 novel by Jane Yolen
- Briar Rose, a novella by Robert Coover

== Other uses ==
- Rosa subsect. Caninae
  - Rosa rubiginosa, also known as sweet briar, a flowering plant
- The Legend of Briar Rose, a series of paintings by the Pre-Raphaelite artist Edward Burne-Jones
- Briar Rose (band), a traditional heavy metal band from Swansea, Massachusetts, USA
- "Briar Rose" (Dollhouse), the eleventh episode of Dollhouse
