= Cardale, Pennsylvania =

Unincorporated community in Pennsylvania, US

- Unincorporated community
- Location within Pennsylvania
- Coordinates: 39°57′24″N 79°51′58″W
- Country: United States
- State: Pennsylvania
- County: Fayette
- Elevation: 974 ft (297 m)
- Time zone: UTC-5 (Eastern (EST))
  - Summer (DST): UTC-4 (EDT)
- ZIP code: 15420
- Area codes: 724, 878
- GNIS feature ID: 1171200

Cardale is an unincorporated community in Fayette County, Pennsylvania, United States. The community is located 8.8 miles (14.2 km) west-northwest of Uniontown. Cardale has a post office, with ZIP code 15420, which opened on September 5, 1924.

== Notable people ==
- Walter F. Pudlowski Jr., US Army major general
