= Brier (surname) =

Brier is an English topographic surname. It was used for people who lived near briar patches or as a nickname for a prickly person. Notable people with the surname include:

- Bob Brier (born 1943), American Egyptologist
- Glenn W. Brier (1913 - 1998), United States statistician and weather forecaster
- Hannah Brier (born 1998), British sprinter
- Joe Brier (born 1999), British sprinter and brother of Hannah
- Kathy Brier (born 1975), American actor and singer
- Markus Brier (born 1968), Austrian golfer
- Paul Brier (born 1959), American general
- Sabrina Brier (born 1994), American actress, comedian, and influencer
- Tom Brier (born 1971), American ragtime composer and pianist, child prodigy

== See also ==
- Briers, a surname
