= Briar Rose (novel) =

1992 young adult novel Jane Yolen

Briar Rose the
- First edition hardcover
- Author: Jane Yolen
- Language: English
- Publisher: Tor Books (hardcover), Tor Teen paperback (paperback)
- Publication date: 1992
- Publication place: United States
- Media type: Print (Hardback & Paperback)
- Pages: 224
- Awards: Mythopoeic Fantasy Award for Adult Literature (1993)
- ISBN: 0-312-85135-9 (hardcover); ISBN 0-8125-5862-6 (paperback)
- Dewey Decimal: 813/.54 20
- LC Class: PS3575.O43 B75 1992

Briar Rose is a young adult novel written by American author Jane Yolen, published in 1992. Incorporating elements of Sleeping Beauty, it was published as part of the Fairy Tale Series of novels compiled by Terri Windling. The novel won the annual Mythopoeic Fantasy Award for Adult Literature in 1993. It was also nominated for the Nebula Award for Best Novel.

== Plot summary ==
The book is divided into two parts, the "home", and the "castle". The ending is part of the "home" section, returning after the castle.

The story is based around the German fairy tale of Briar Rose (Sleeping Beauty) which is told by "Gemma", an elderly woman, to her three granddaughters. She tells this to the children almost all the time and it is the only bedtime story she ever tells. The times when "Gemma" tells the story are flashbacks and alternate between the present-day story.

=== "Home" ===
In the present day, Gemma's Jewish family is living Western Massachusetts. After her grandmother's death, Rebecca Berlin, the youngest of her three granddaughters (referred to as Becca in the novel) begins to believe that there is some meaning behind the bedtime story that her grandmother told to them hundreds of times. She consults Stan, a good friend and journalist who works for an "alternative" newspaper and uncovers historical facts.

She discovers that her grandmother was actually a survivor of the Holocaust who was persecuted for her Jewish origins, and sent to Chełmno extermination camp to be executed. She decides to visit Chełmno and discovers a link with a man by the name of Josef Potocki in Poland. Becca sets off for Poland to find the identity and the life of her grandmother.

=== The Castle - Josef's story ===
In Poland, Josef tells his life story and his meeting with Gemma. In the book, his story is told in the "castle" section. He was a target of the Holocaust due to his homosexuality, and became a fugitive, during which time he met many different people, mainly partisans, mainly in Germany. He had heard stories of torture and extermination camps and joined an underground group set out to rescue victims. This leads him to Chełmno (called Kulmhof by the Germans), where he witnesses the gassing to death of numerous people. The people are brought to the camp and then packed into trucks. The trucks drive away, with their exhaust funnelled into the passenger hold. By the time the trucks arrive at their destination, a mass grave, all of the people it was carrying have been gassed to death by the truck exhaust. The people are then dumped into the grave. When the bodies are dumped one of the partisans, named The Avenger notices that a woman with red hair (Gemma) is still alive and faintly breathing. Josef revives her through mouth-to-mouth resuscitation, which the woman, (who is later called KSIĘŻNICZKA, which means 'princess' in Polish) refers to in her fairy tale as "the kiss of life". In reality, during this period of time, 320,000 were killed in Chelmno via the method of gassing them in trucks.

Later, she hid in the forest with Polish partisans, fighting the Nazis, and married The Avenger, whom Josef was also in love with. She became pregnant by him shortly after their marriage. Then he, along with almost all of the other partisans, was killed by the Nazis. She escaped and was brought safely to the United States. She never told a soul about these experiences, rather dealing with the trauma by refashioning them in her mind into the form of a familiar fairytale about an evil witch, a princess rendered unconscious who is then revived by a handsome prince, and a happy ending.

=== 'Home Again' ===
The final part of the book is simply a conclusion where Becca returns to the U.S. to tell Stan and her family about what she discovered. At the airport, Stan is there to pick her up. He kisses her, and says "We'll get to our happily ever after eventually".

== Style ==
=== Juxtaposition ===
The story was written to juxtapose the present-day story with the fairy tale that Gemma tells them. In the book, every odd chapter (except for within the Castle) is a flashback to Becca's childhood in which Gemma tells her story to her grandchildren. Gemma is a victim of the holocaust.

=== Setting at Chełmno ===
At the Chełmno extermination camp, approximately 340,000 people, mainly Jewish prisoners, were killed. The extermination of the Łódź Ghetto took place in Chełmno.

== Response ==
Briar Rose has received a very warm response from most critics, especially for its unusual organization. The book is not told in a direct beginning-to-end style, and the story is not told directly to the reader but rather through the fairy tale. Critics praised it for this type of storytelling technique.

Publishers Weekly considered Briar Rose one of the "most ambitious efforts" in Windling's Fairy Tale series and claimed, "Only a writer as good as Yolen [...] could bring it off". Publishers Weekly further stated, "By interpolating Gemma's vivid and imaginative story into the larger narrative, Yolen has created an engrossing novel. She handles a difficult subject with finesse in a book that should be required reading for anyone who is tempted to dismiss fantasy as a frivolous genre."

Kirkus Reviews similarly stated the novel has a "provocative premise", but disagreed with Yolen's ability to "bring it off", writing, "The idea has lots of potential, but Yolen's thin novel fails to integrate the material smoothly." They explained that "the first half has little tension", and although "Gemma's wartime experiences is riveting and moving", "it's all told by a third party at the end of the book; Becca doesn't so much solve the mystery as find a narrator to tell her the story." They concluded their review, "Prolific YA and children's writer Yolen [...] had a good idea here, but didn't follow through."

In a review of the audiobook, AudioFile highlighted how narrator "Linda Stephens's reading vibrates with imaginative characterizations and bold feeling. Like a sculptor with her chisel, Stephens shapes Yolen's story with her voice, flawlessly interprets mood and tone, and breathes personality into her characters." They concluded, "From old Prince Pototsky to eager, young Gemma, there is magic in the listening."

Booklist also reviewed the novel.

== Awards and honors ==
In 1992, the Science Fiction Chronicle name Briar Rose the Best fantasy Novel of the Year. The following year, it won the Mythopoeic Fantasy Award for Adult Literature and was a finalist for the Nebula Award for Best Novel.

Briar Rose was part of Australia's New South Wales Department of Education and Training's Higher School Certificate curriculum.

== See also ==
- Holocaust in Poland
- Nazi crimes against ethnic Poles
- Sleeping Beauty
