= Briar Hill, Northamptonshire =

Briar Hill
- District
- Map showing location of Briar Hill
- Coordinates: 52°13′36.20″N 0°55′17.69″W
- Sovereign State: United Kingdom
- Country: England
- Ceremonial county: Northamptonshire
- Unitary authority: West Northamptonshire
- Civil parish: Northampton

Area
  - Total: 0.34 sq mi (0.88 km^{2})
- Elevation: 266 ft (81 m)

Briar Hill is an area of Northampton, in the West Northamptonshire district, in the ceremonial county of Northamptonshire, England.
