= Gaston Brière =

French art historian (1871–1962)

Gaston Brière (1 December 1871, 11th arrondissement of Paris – 22 June 1962, 16th arrondissement of Paris) was a French art historian and head curator of France's national museums. He specialised in 17th and 18th century French painting and taught a noted course at the École du Louvre from 1912 to 1938. In 1903 he joined the staff of the Palace de Versailles, becoming its chief curator from 1932 to 1938.
