= Greenbrier, Indiana =

Greenbrier, Indiana may refer to:

- Greenbrier, Orange County, Indiana
- Greenbrier, Warrick County, Indiana
