= Briar Patch =

Briar Patch or variants may refer to:

- a thicket formed by thorny plants
- Briar Patch, a place in the fictional Br'er Rabbit stories
- Briar Patch (Star Trek), a fictional region of space
- "Briar Patch", a 1989 story by Dean Ing in the Man-Kzin Wars series
- "Briarpatch", a song by Devin the Dude from the 2004 album To tha X-Treme
- Briar Patch, a character in The Charmkins TV Special.
- The Briar Patch, a 1973 book by Murray Kempton about the trial of the Panther 21
- Briarpatch, a Canadian news magazine
- Briarpatch, a 1984 novel by Ross Thomas
  - Briarpatch (TV series), an American TV series based on the novel
- Briarpatch, a 2011 novel by Tim Pratt
