= Norman Briers =

English cricketer (born 1947)

Norman Briers (born 10 February 1947) is an English former cricketer. He was a right-handed batsman and a right-arm medium-fast bowler who played for Leicestershire. He was born in Highfields, Leicester.

Briers' career with the Second XI began in 1965, but he had to wait a further two years until he made his only appearance in a first-class match, against Cambridge University. The game, most notable for opener Michael Norman carrying his bat for a first-class best 221 not out, saw Briers score just one run in the only innings in which he batted.

Briers continued playing for the Second XI until the end of the 1967 season.
