= Greenbrier, Lexington =

Greenbrier
- Neighborhood of Lexington, Kentucky
- Interactive map of Greenbrier
- Coordinates: 38.026°N 84.382°W
- Country: United States
- State: Kentucky
- County: Fayette
- City: Lexington

Area
  - Total: .650 sq mi (1.68 km^{2})
  - Water: 0 sq mi (0.0 km^{2})

Population (2000)
  - Total: 333
  - Density: 513/sq mi (198/km^{2})
- Time zone: UTC-5 (Eastern (EST))
  - Summer (DST): UTC-4 (EDT)
- ZIP code: 40509
- Area code: 859
- Website: gb-ra.com

Greenbrier is a neighborhood in southeastern Lexington, Kentucky, United States. At the time of its building in the 1960s it was a rural subdivision, though it is now bounded by new subdivisions to its west. Its boundaries are Winchester Road to the north, Walnut Grove Lane to the east, east of Blackford Parkway to the south, and the Hamburg Farm to the west.

== Neighborhood statistics ==
- Area: 0.650 square miles (1.68 km^{2})
- Population: 333
- Population density: 513 people per square mile
- Median household income: $95,107 (2010)
