= Greenbrier High School =

Greenbrier High School may refer to:

- Greenbrier High School (Arkansas) - Greenbrier, Arkansas
- Greenbrier High School (Georgia) - Evans, Georgia
- Greenbrier High School (Tennessee) - Greenbrier, Tennessee
- Greenbrier East High School - Fairlea, West Virginia
- Greenbrier West High School - Charmco, West Virginia
