= Lower Peninsula of Michigan =

Region of U.S. state

Coordinates: 43°40′N 84°45′W

- Michigan
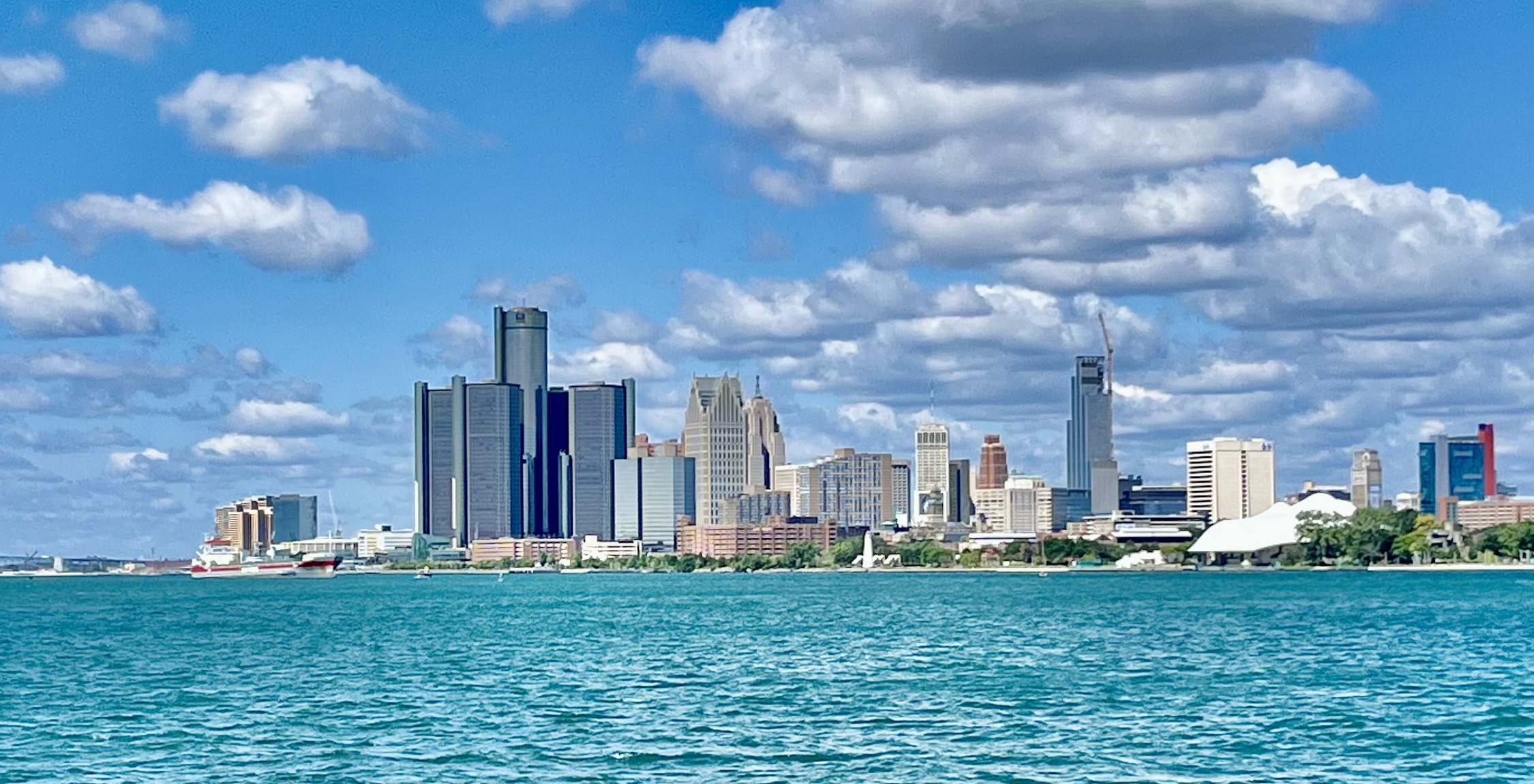
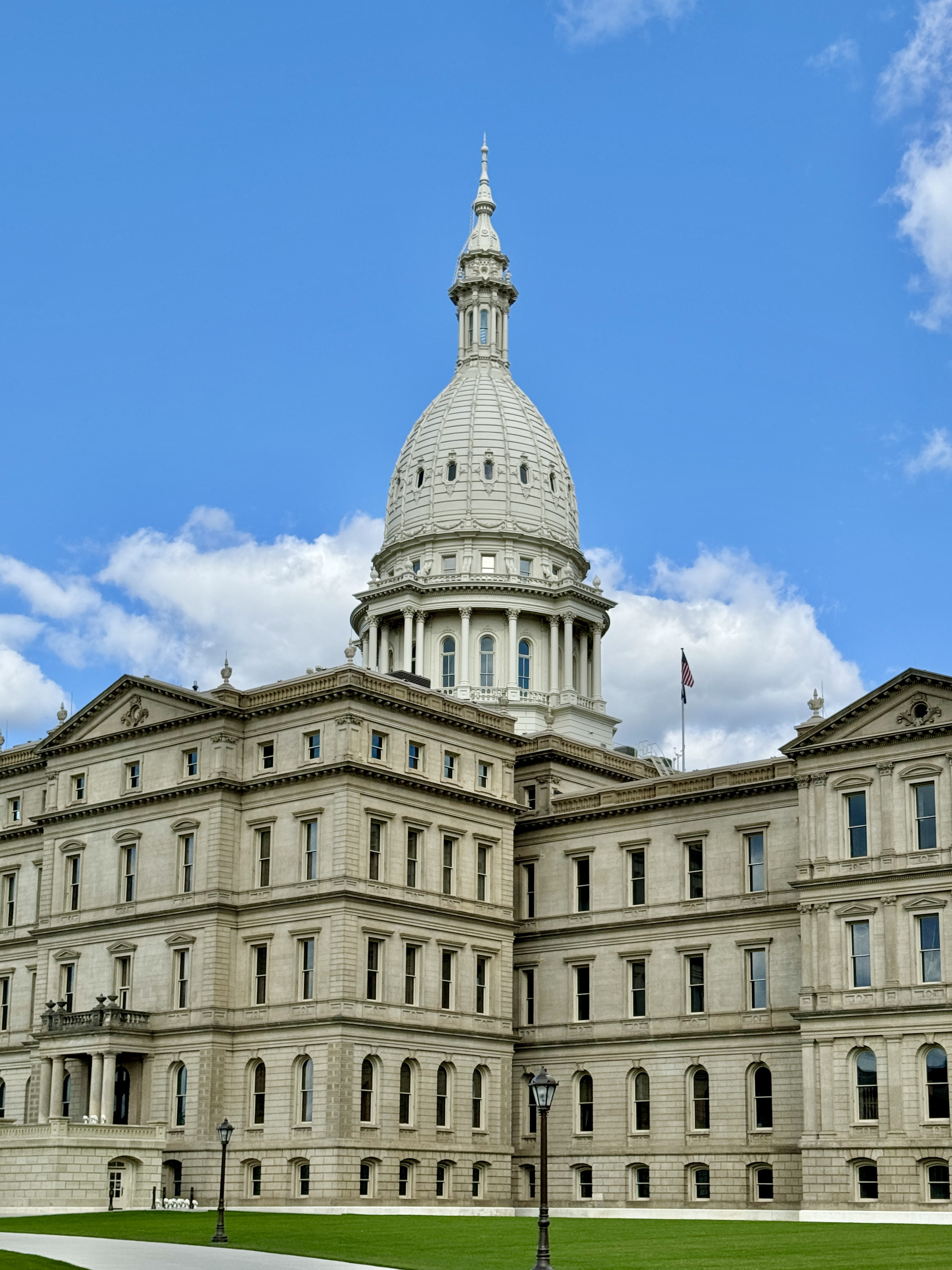
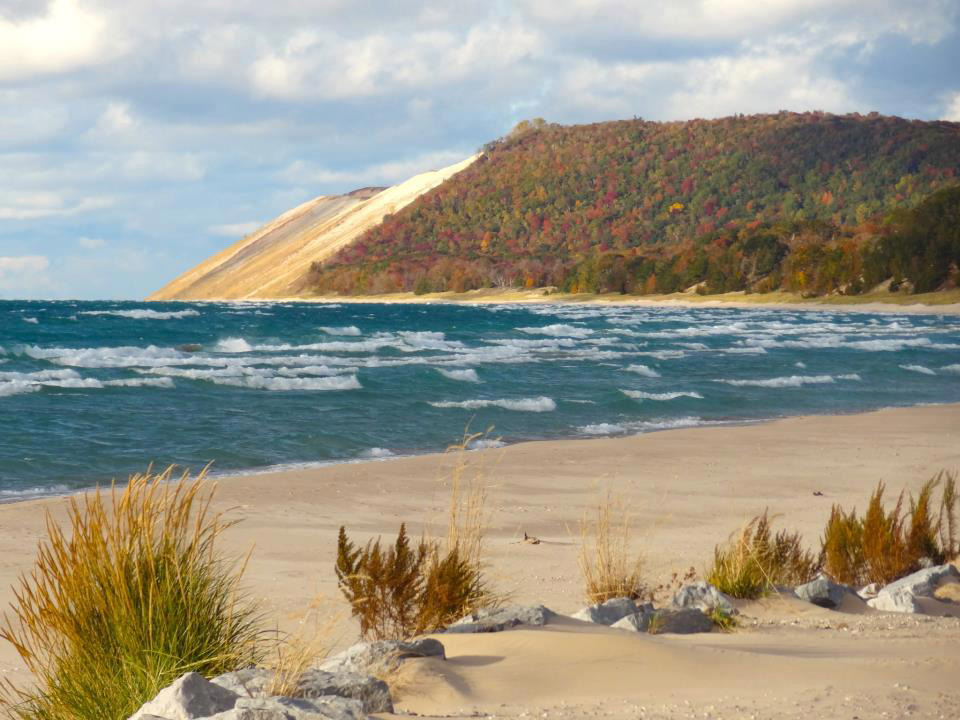
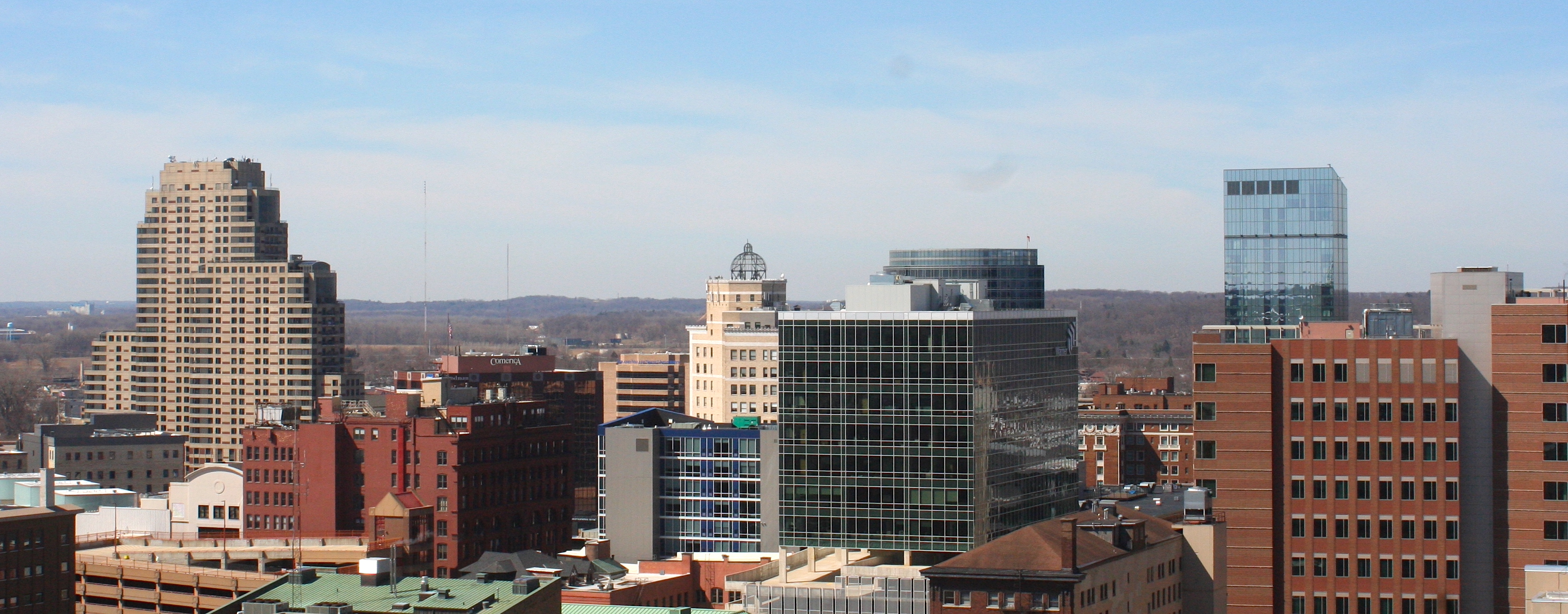
- Downtown Detroit skyline Michigan State Capitol Sleeping Bear Dunes National Lakeshore Downtown Grand Rapids skyline
- Nickname: The Mitten
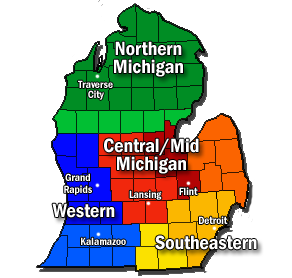
- Regions and major cities of the Lower Peninsula
- Country: United States
- State: Michigan

Area
  - Total: 40,162 sq mi (104,020 km^{2})

Population (2015 est.)
  - Total: 9,584,261
  - Density: 238.64/sq mi (92.139/km^{2})

The Lower Peninsula of Michigan, also known as Lower Michigan, is the larger, southern and less-elevated of the two major landmasses that make up the U.S. state of Michigan. It is separated from the Upper Peninsula by the Straits of Mackinac. The Lower Peninsula is surrounded by water on all sides except its southern border, which it shares with Indiana and Ohio.

Although the Upper Peninsula is commonly referred to as the U.P., it is uncommon for the Lower Peninsula to be called the L.P. Because of its recognizable shape, the Lower Peninsula is nicknamed The Mitten, with the eastern region identified as The Thumb. This has led to several folkloric creation myths for the area, one of which is that the handprint of Paul Bunyan, a giant lumberjack and popular European-American folk character in Michigan. When asked where they live, peninsula residents may hold up their right hand and point to a spot on the palmar side to indicate the location.

The peninsula is sometimes divided into the Northern Lower Peninsula—which is more sparsely populated and largely forested—and the Southern Lower Peninsula—which is largely urban or farmland. Southern Lower Michigan is sometimes further divided into economic and cultural subregions.

The more populated and culturally diverse Lower Peninsula dominates Michigan politics, and maps of it without the Upper Peninsula are sometimes mistakenly presented as the whole of Michigan, which contributes to resentment by Yoopers (residents of the U.P.). People from the Upper Peninsula jokingly refer to residents of the Lower Peninsula as flat-landers (referring to the region's less-rugged terrain) or trolls (because, being south of the Mackinac Bridge, they "live under the bridge").

== Geography ==
The Lower Peninsula is bounded on the west by Lake Michigan and on the northeast by Lake Huron, which connect at the Straits of Mackinac. In the southeast, the waterway consisting of the St. Clair River, Lake St. Clair, Detroit River, and Lake Erie separates it from the province of Ontario, Canada. It is bounded on the south by the states of Indiana and Ohio. The southern border is irregular: the border with Indiana was moved 10 miles northward from its territorial position to give Indiana more access to Lake Michigan, and its slightly angled border with Ohio was part of the compromise which ended the Toledo War. The peninsula is a part of the Great Lakes Plain, which includes large parts of Wisconsin and Ohio.

At its widest points, the peninsula is 277 miles (446 km) long from north to south and 195 miles (314 km) from east to west. It contains nearly two-thirds of Michigan's total land area. The surface of the peninsula is generally level, broken by conical hills and glacial moraines usually not more than a few hundred feet tall, most common in the north. The highest point in the peninsula is not definitely established, but is either Briar Hill at 1,705 feet (520 m) above sea level, or one of several points nearby in the vicinity of Cadillac. The lowest point is at the shore of Lake Erie at 571 feet (174 m). The western coast features extensive sandy beaches and dunes produced by Lake Michigan and the prevailing winds from the west. The relatively shallow Saginaw Bay is surrounded by a similarly shallow drainage basin. Several large river systems flow into the adjacent Great Lakes, including the Kalamazoo, Grand, Muskegon, and Manistee rivers (Lake Michigan), and the Au Sable and Tittabawassee–Shiawassee–Saginaw rivers (Lake Huron). Because of the networks of rivers and numerous lakes, no point on land is more than six miles (9.7 km) from one of these bodies of water, and at most 85 miles (137 km) from one of the Great Lakes (near Lansing).

=== Flora and fauna ===
The American Bird Conservancy and the National Audubon Society have designated several locations on the peninsula as internationally Important Bird Areas.

=== Geology ===
The Lower Peninsula is dominated by a geological basin known as the Michigan Basin. The basin is a nearly circular pattern of sedimentary strata in the area, with a nearly uniform structural dip toward the center of the peninsula. The basin is centered on Gladwin County, where the Precambrian-age basement rocks are 16,000 feet (4,900 m) deep. Around the margins, such as under Mackinaw City, the Precambrian layer is around 4,000 feet (1,200 m) down. This 4,000-foot (1,200 m) contour of the bedrock clips the northern part of the peninsula and continues under Lake Michigan to the west. It crosses the southern counties of Michigan and continues on to the north beneath Lake Huron.

=== Climate ===
Most monthly temperatures in the peninsula range from a low of 14 degrees to a high of 84 degrees Fahrenheit.

== Regions ==
Michigan regions, including the Upper Peninsula and the four principal regions of the Lower Peninsula

The peninsula can be divided into four main regions based on geological and geographical differences; the amount of urban areas or rural areas; minority populations; and agriculture. The four principal regions listed below can further be separated into sub-regions and overlapping areas:

- Northern Michigan
- Central or Mid-Michigan
  - The Thumb
  - Tri-Cities
  - Southern Michigan
- West Michigan
  - Southern Michigan
  - Michiana
- Southeast Michigan
  - Metro Detroit

== Transportation ==
=== Major airports ===
- Alpena County Regional Airport (APN) (Alpena)
- Bishop International Airport (FNT) (Flint)
- Capital Region International Airport (LAN) (Lansing)
- Cherry Capital Airport (TVC) (Traverse City)
- Detroit Metropolitan Wayne County Airport (DTW) (Romulus)
- Gerald R. Ford International Airport (GRR) (Grand Rapids)
- Kalamazoo/Battle Creek International Airport (AZO) (Kalamazoo)
- MBS International Airport (MBS) (Saginaw)
- Pellston Regional Airport (PLN) (Pellston)

=== Highways ===
Interstate Highways in the region include:

- I-69
- I-75
- I-94
- I-96

U.S. Highways in the region include:

- US 10
- US 12
- US 23
- US 24
- US 31
- US 127
- US 131
- US 223

The Great Lakes Circle Tour is a designated scenic road system connecting all of the Great Lakes and the St. Lawrence River.

=== Passenger rail ===
The peninsula is served by three Amtrak routes that travel up to 110 miles per hour (180 km/h), namely the Wolverine, Pere Marquette, and Blue Water routes.

=== Intercity bus ===
Various intercity buses transport people across the peninsula, including the Michigan Flyer that travels from Lansing to the Detroit Metro Airport with stops in Brighton and Ann Arbor, and the D2A2 nonstop bus from Detroit to Ann Arbor.

== See also ==
- List of counties in Michigan
