= Manistee River Trail =

Hiking trail

Coordinates: 44.362109°N 85.822058°W

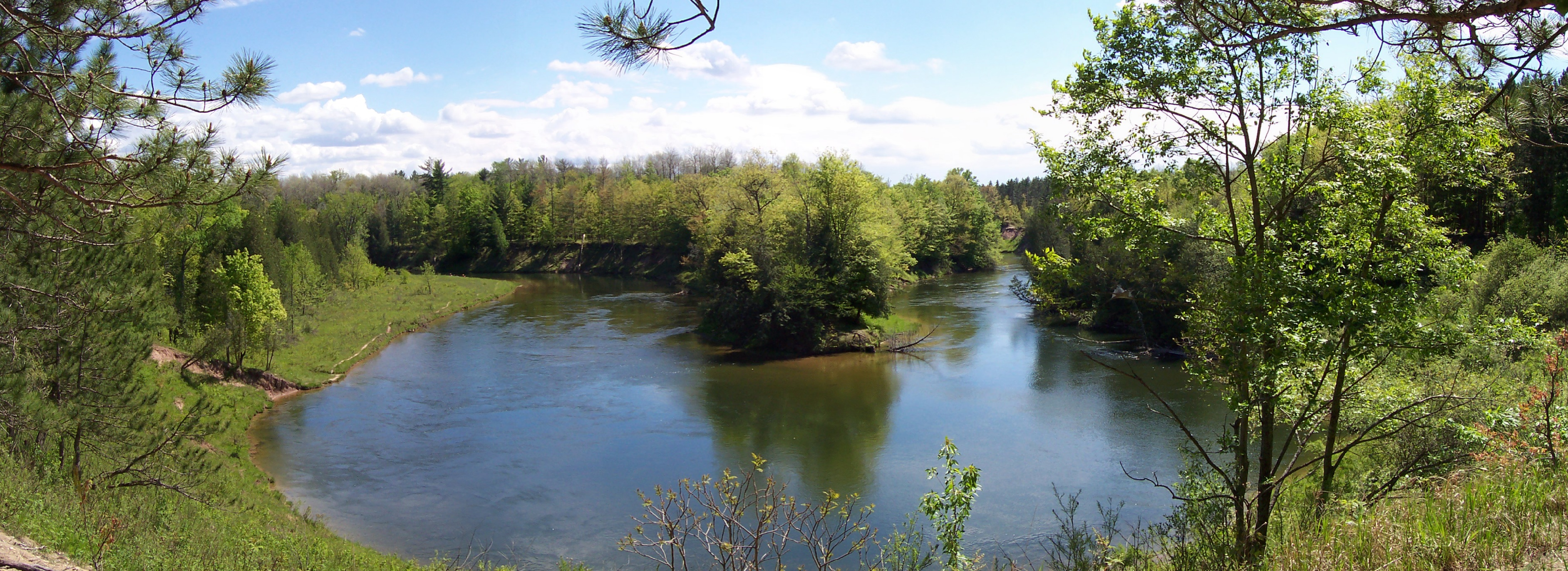
- Manistee River overlook
- Length: 11 miles (18 km)
- Location: Huron-Manistee National Forests, Michigan, United States
- Trailheads: Seaton Creek; Red Bridge
- Use: Hiking
- Difficulty: Moderate
- Months: January–December
- Sights: Diverse vegetation, spring-fed waterfalls, river bluffs, and wetlands.
- Website: www.fs.usda.gov/recarea/hmnf/recarea/?recid=18710

The Manistee River Trail is an 11-mile (18 km) linear hiking trail located in Michigan in Manistee County, along the east bank of the Manistee River between Red Bridge River Access and Seaton Creek Campground.

A 23-mile (37 km) loop trail can be formed by two connector trails at the southern and northern termini connecting the Manistee River Trail to the North Country National Scenic Trail. The loop trail can be accessed from the Marilla and Upper Branch Trailheads for the North Country National Scenic Trail and the Red Bridge and Seaton Creek accesses for the Manistee River Trail.

== See also ==
- North Country National Scenic Trail
