= Briars (surname) =

Briars is a surname. Notable people with the surname include:

- Diane Briars (born 1951), American mathematics educator
- Gawain Briars (born 1958), British squash player and lawyer
