= Brier Hill, Pennsylvania =

Unincorporated community in Pennsylvania, US

- Unincorporated community
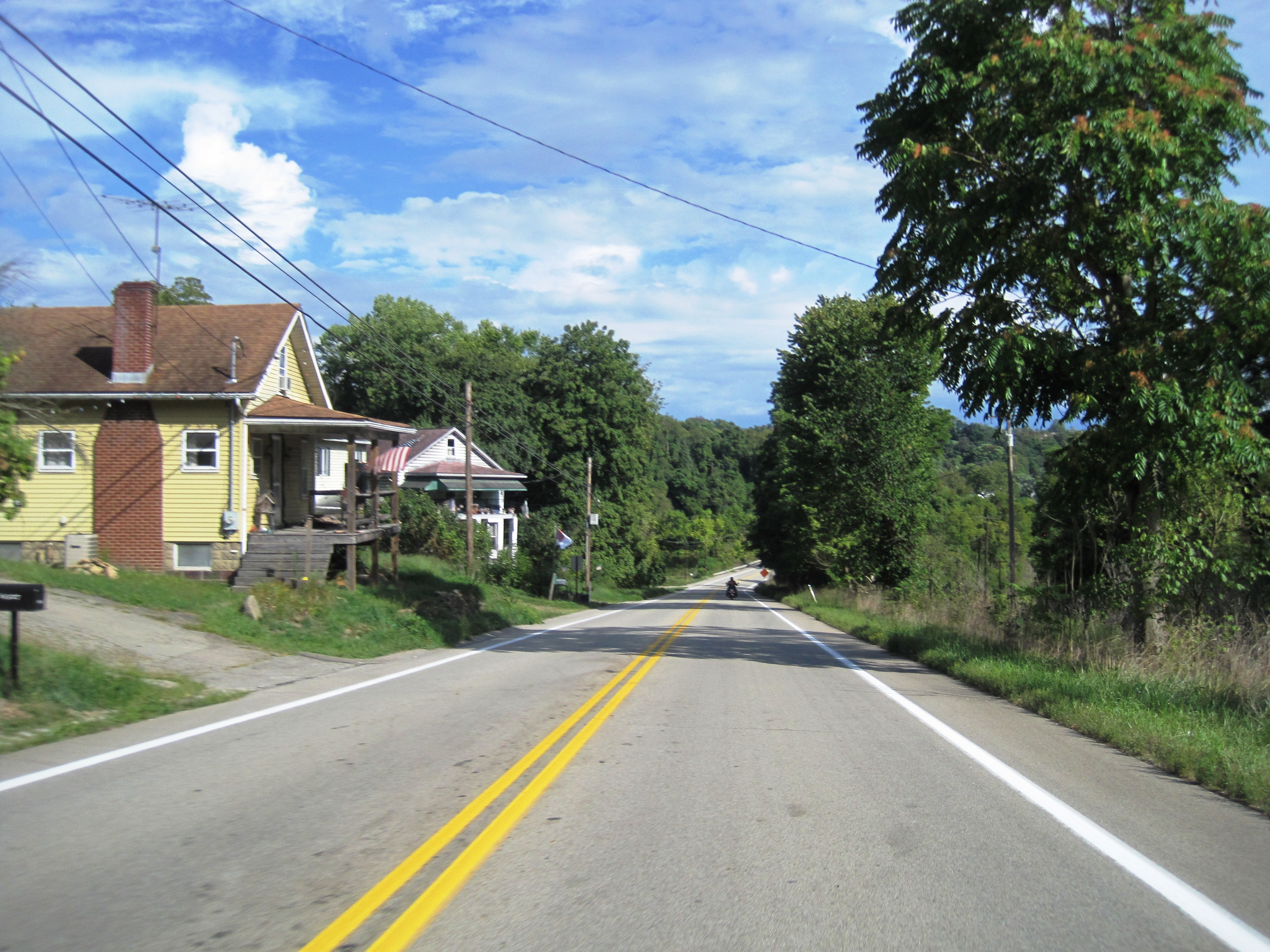
- US 40 (National Pike) eastbound through Brier Hill

- Location within Pennsylvania Location within the United States
- Coordinates: 39°58′49″N 79°49′41″W
- Country: United States
- State: Pennsylvania
- County: Fayette
- Township: Redstone
- Elevation: 1,122 ft (342 m)
- Time zone: UTC-5 (Eastern (EST))
  - Summer (DST): UTC-4 (EDT)
- ZIP code: 15415
- Area codes: 724, 878
- GNIS feature ID: 1170248

Brier Hill is an unincorporated community in Redstone Township, Fayette County, Pennsylvania, United States. The community is located along U.S. Route 40, 8.2 miles (13.2 km) northwest of Uniontown. Brier Hill has a post office, with ZIP code 15415.

== Notable people ==
- Walter F. Pudlowski Jr., US Army major general
