= Naren Briar =

American politician, activist (born 1998)

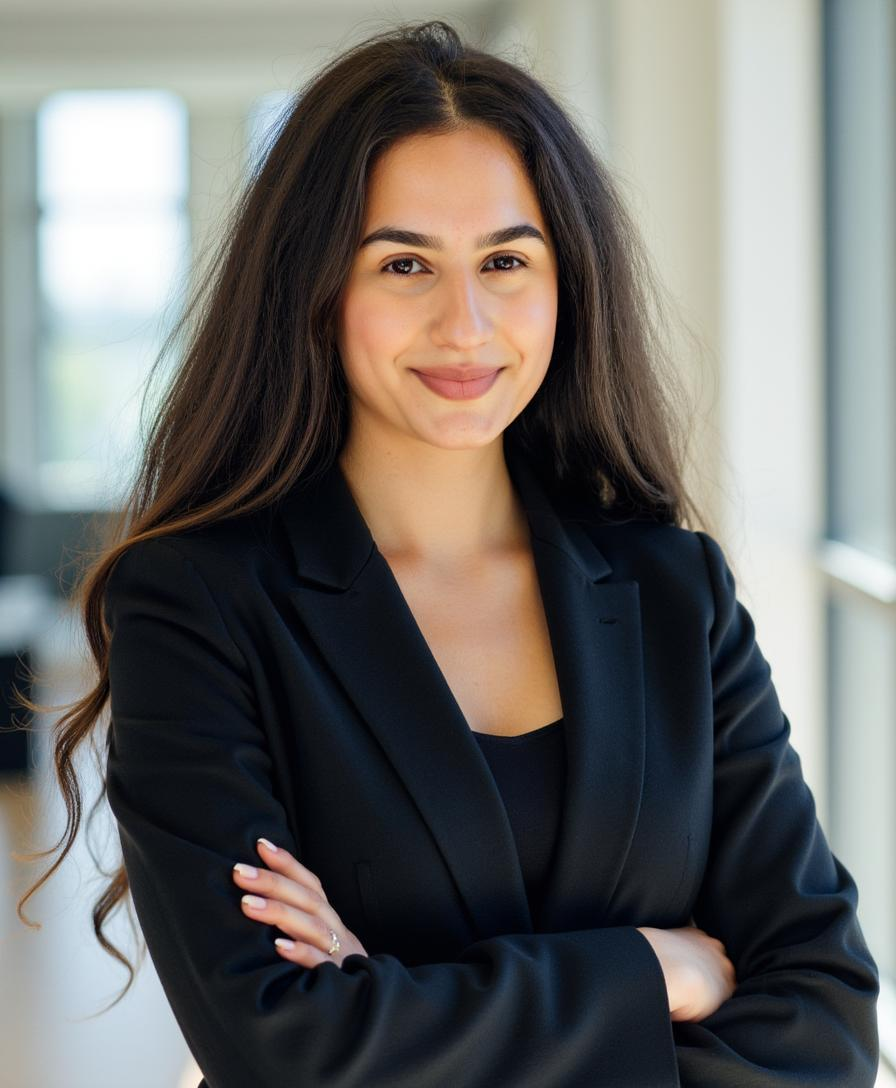

Member of the Bellevue City Council from Position 2
- Incumbent
- Assumed office January 1, 2026
- Preceded by: Conrad Lee

Personal details
- Born: 1998 (age 27–28) Dallas, Texas, U.S.
- Party: Nonpartisan
- Education: Boston College (BA)
- Occupation: Politician, product manager, activist
- Website: briarforbellevue.com

Naren Briar (born 1998) is an American politician serving as a member of the Bellevue City Council in Washington. She is the first Kurdish-American elected to public office in the United States. Briar has a background in privacy, and policy, and an interest in human rights activism.

== Early life and education ==
Naren Briar was born in 1998, in Dallas, Texas, to Iraqi Kurdish parents who were refugees and fled the regime of Saddam Hussein. Her father's family survived the Halabja chemical attack in 1988.

She attended Boston College, where she received a bachelor of arts degree in 2020 in political science and government.

== Career ==
From 2022 to 2024, she was a product manager at Meta in Seattle, focusing on the intersection of privacy, and policy.

In 2025, Briar ran for Bellevue City Council, Position 2, on a progressive platform focused on affordable housing, public transit expansion, and AI ethics in local government. In the general election held on November 4, 2025, she defeated long-time incumbent Conrad Lee, receiving 17,080 votes (53.7%). Her term began on January 1, 2026.
