= Briar Hill (Michigan) =

Highest point in the lower peninsula of Michigan

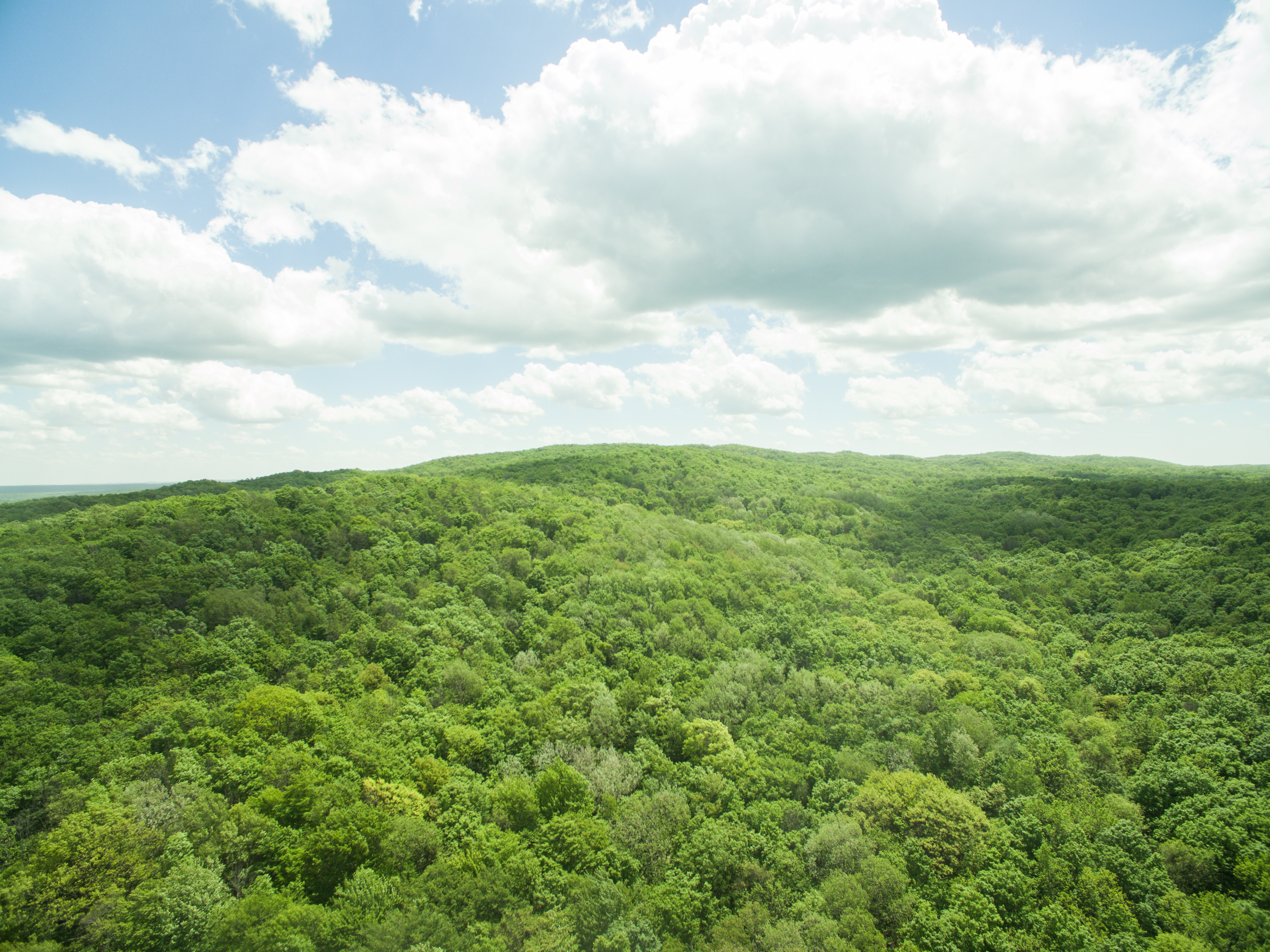
- Briar Hill (1,706 ft) is the second-highest point in the lower peninsula of Michigan

Highest point
- Elevation: 1,706 ft (520 m)
- Prominence: 1,041 ft (317 m)
- Coordinates: 44°21′58″N 85°40′46″W

Geography
- Country: United States
- State: Michigan
- Counties: Wexford

Briar Hill, at 1,706 ft, is the second-highest point in the Lower Peninsula of Michigan, behind nearby Grove Hill at 1,709 feet. It is entirely within the Manistee National Forest. The area was carved out during the last ice age, and retreating glaciers left large deposits of sand, which created Briar Hill and the nearby Caberfae Hills.

The region is subject to heavy lake-effect snow from Lake Michigan. No official weather records are maintained on the hill. Fauna in the area includes black bears, coyotes, fisher, marten, mink, white-tailed deer, gray and red foxes, porcupines, river otters and beavers. Access to the area requires bushwhacking as there are no marked trails.

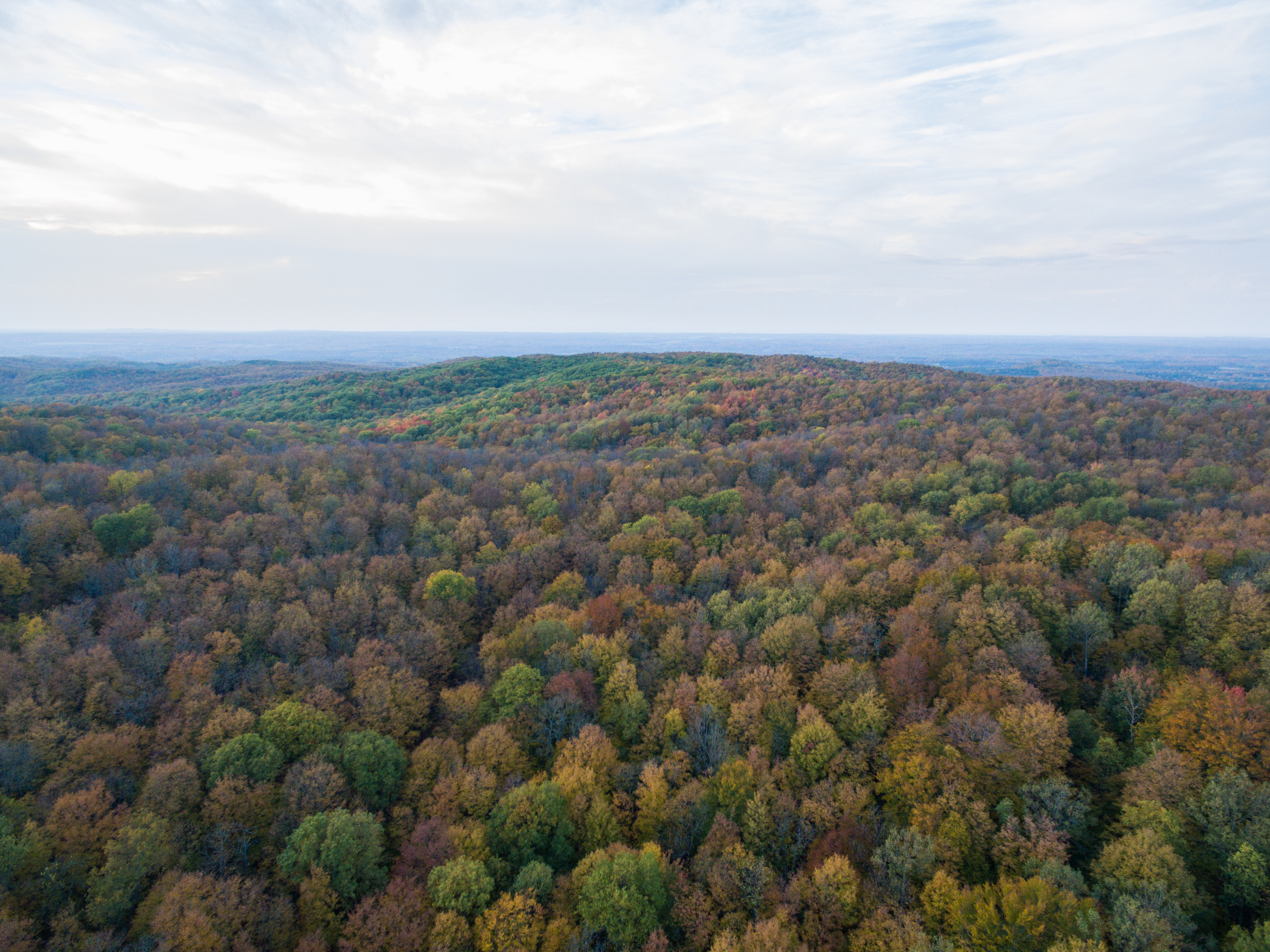
Briar Hill in October 2018

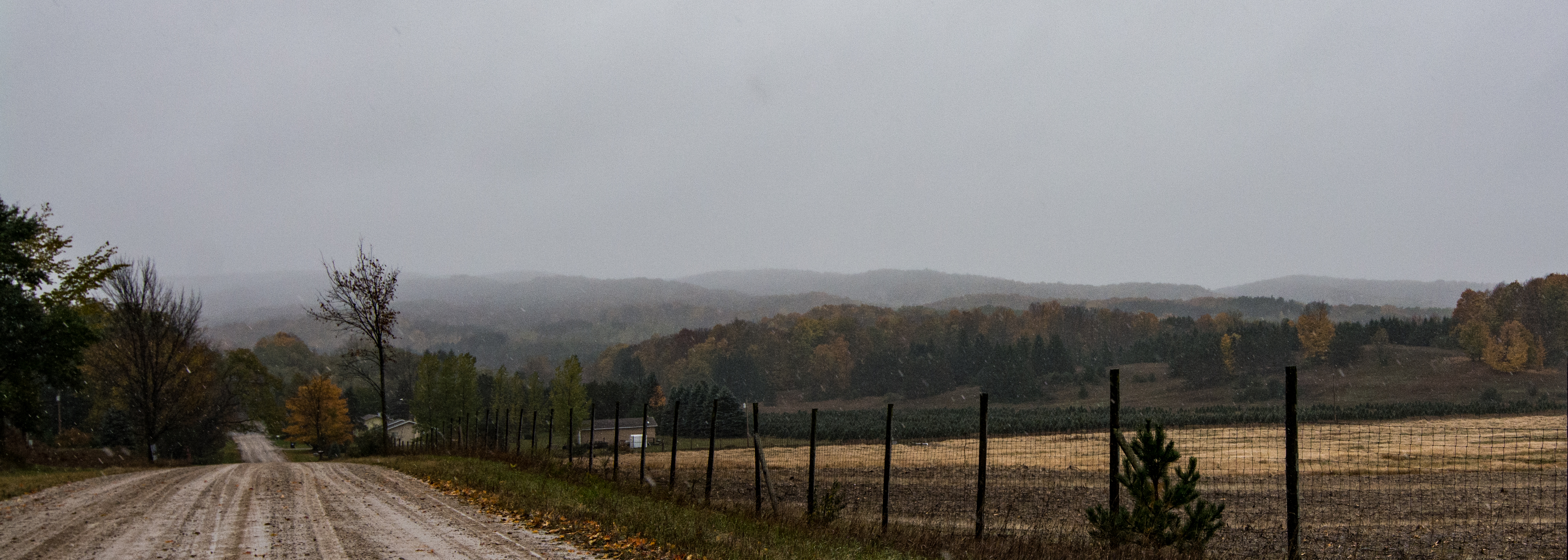
View of the Briar Hill moraine from N 15 Rd, facing south
