= List of media featuring space marines =

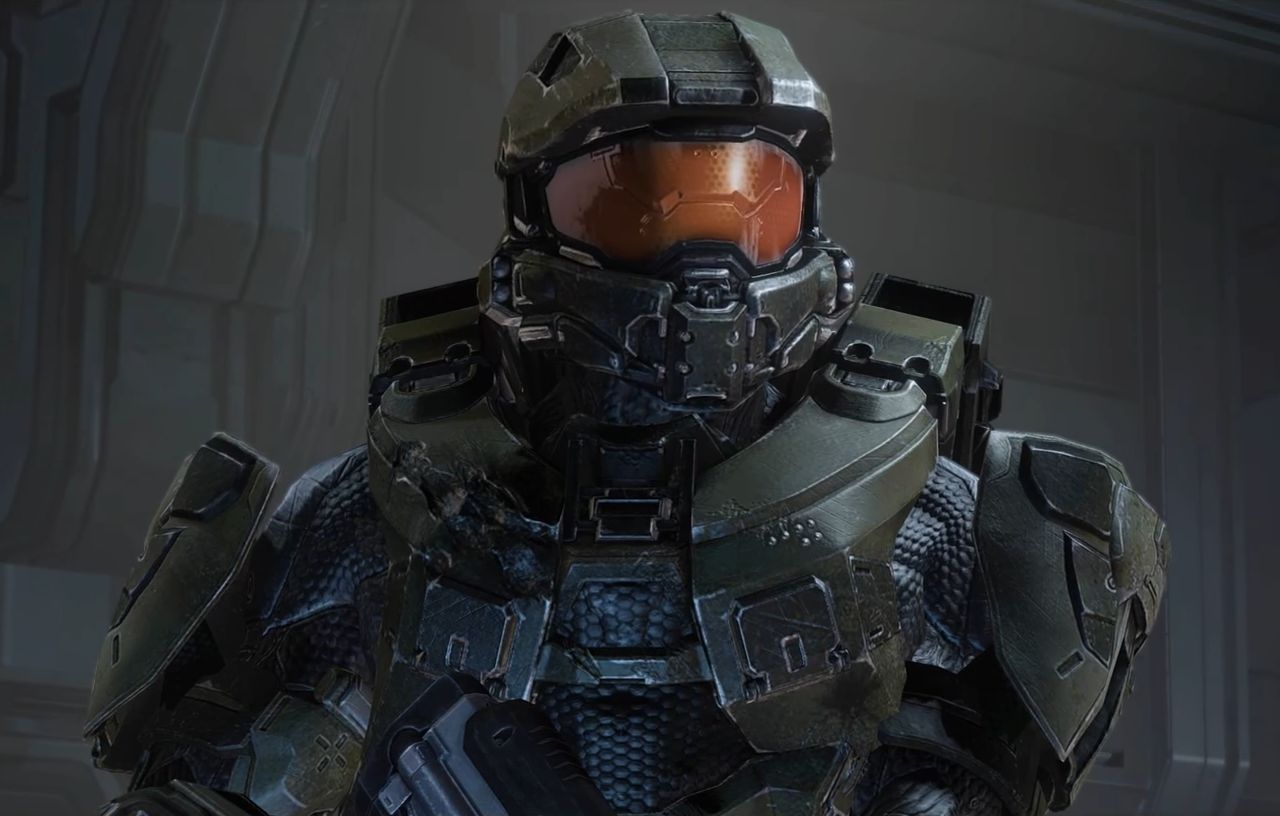
Master Chief from Halo

Fictional space marines have been included in a variety of short stories, novels, films, television, and games from the 1930s to the present.

== Literature ==
Author	Title	Year(s) published	Unit name
Bob Olsen	"Captain Brink of the Space Marines"	1932	Space Marines
Bob Olsen	"The Space Marines and the Slavers"	1936	Space Marines
E. E. Smith	Lensman series	1934–1954	Galactic Marines
Robert A. Heinlein	"Misfit"	1939	Space Marines
John York Cabot	"Sergeant Shane of the Space Marines"	1941	Space Marines
John York Cabot	"The Odds on Sergeant Shane"	1941	Space Marines
John York Cabot	"Sergeant Shane Goes to War"	1942	Space Marines
Duncan Farnsworth	"Flight from Farisha"	1942	Space Marines
D. D. Sharp	"Pillage of the Space-Marine"	1943	Space-Marines
Bob Courtney	"Aid to the Enemy"	1943	Space-Marines
Robert A. Heinlein	"The Long Watch"	1949	Space Marines
Theodore Cogswell	"The Spectre General"	1952	Imperial Space Marines
Carey Rockwell	Treachery in Outer Space	1954	Space Marines
Carey Rockwell	Sabotage in Space	1955	Space Marines
G. Harry Stine	Rocket Man	1955	Space Marines
Eric Frank Russell	"The Waitabits"	1955	Space-Marines
Randall Garrett	"Needler"	1957	Space Marines
Eric Frank Russell	Wasp	1957	Space Marines (Sirian Combine)
Robert F. Young	"Passage to Gomorrah"	1959	Space Marines
Robert A. Heinlein	Starship Troopers	1959	Mobile Infantry
Kenneth Bulmer	"Of Earth Foretold"	1960	Space Marine
Kenneth Bulmer	"Earth's Long Shadow"	1960	Space Marine
Harry Harrison	The Stainless Steel Rat	1961	Space Marines
Andre Norton	Star Hunter	1961	Space Marines
H. Beam Piper	Little Fuzzy	1962	Space Marines
H. Beam Piper	The Cosmic Computer	1963	Space Marines
Frank Herbert	Dune	1965	Sardaukar
Joe Haldeman	The Forever War	1974	United Nations Exploratory Force (UNEF)
Larry Niven and Jerry Pournelle	The Mote in God's Eye and related novels	1975	Imperial Marines
Jerry Pournelle and S. M. Stirling	The Prince or Falkenberg's Legion series	1976–1993; 2002	CoDominium Marines
Orson Scott Card	Ender's Game	1985	Marines
David Weber	Starfire series	1990–present	Federation Navy Marine Corps
David Weber	Honor Harrington series	1992–present	Royal Manticoran Marine Corps (RMMC) of the Star Kingdom of Manticore, et cetera
David Sherman and Dan Cragg	StarFist series	1997–present	Confederation Marine Corps
Ian Douglas	1. Heritage Trilogy; 2. Legacy trilogy 3. Inheritance trilogy	1998–present	United States Marines Corps, United Star Marine Corps
R. J. Pineiro	"Flight of Endeavour"	2001	United Nations Security Council Space Marines
John Ringo	1. Into the Looking Glass; 2. Vorpal Blade; 3. Claws That Catch; 4. The Manxome Foe	2005–present	Allied Space Marines
John Varley	Rolling Thunder	2008	Martian Naval Corps
James S. A. Corey	The Expanse series	2011–2022	Martian Marine Corps and United Nations Marine Corps
M.C.A. Hogarth	Spots the Space Marine	2012	Space Marine

== Films and television ==
Director	Title	Year(s) published	Unit name
Michael E. Briant	Doctor Who serial "Death to the Daleks"	1973–1974	Marine Space Corps
George Lucas	Star Wars	1977–present	Galactic Marines of the Grand Army of the Republic, originally known as the 21st Nova Corps. The Rebel Alliance has an entire regiment of Space Operations, nicknamed "Rebel Marines". Stormtroopers and Clone Troopers also fit the space marine trope.
Lewis Gilbert	Moonraker	1979	United States Marine Corps on a space shuttle armed with lasers
Leiji Matsumoto	Star Blazers	1979–1984	Ground combat units found on the 11th planet are known as "Space Marines"
James Cameron	Aliens	1986	United States Colonial Marine Corps
Jeff Segal	Exosquad	1993–1994	Exofleet Jumptroops
Douglas Netter and J. Michael Straczynski	Babylon 5	1994–1998	EarthForce Marine Corps (also known as "Gropos" or "GROund POunderS")
Glen Morgan and James Wong	Space: Above and Beyond	1995–1996	United States Marine Corps Space Aviator Cavalry
John Weidner	Space Marines	1996	United Planets Marines
Keiji Gotoh	Kiddy Grade	2001–2002	GOTT Marine Corps
Allan Kroeker, David Straiton, et al.	Star Trek: Enterprise	2003–2005	Military Assault Command Operations (MACO)
David Eick and Ronald D. Moore	Battlestar Galactica	2004–2009	Colonial Marine Corps, Colonial Marine Corps Reserve
Brad Wright and Robert C. Cooper	Stargate Atlantis	2004–2009	United States Marine Corps attached to the Atlantis Expedition
James Cameron	Avatar	2009	Former Marines and mercenaries working with the RDA Corporation on Pandora.
Mark Fergus and Hawk Ostby	The Expanse (TV series)	2015–2022	Martian Marine Corps and United Nations Marine Corps
Ronald D. Moore, Matt Wolpert and Ben Nedivi	For All Mankind	2021	United States Moon Marines, members of the USMC who are an astronaut security and tactical force on the moon.
Dylan Shipley	Hammer and Bolter animated series	2022	Imperial Space Marines and Chaos Space Marines from Games Workshop's Warhammer 40,000.

== Games ==
Title	Publisher	Game type	Year(s) published	Unit name
Starship Troopers	Avalon Hill	Board wargame	1976	Mobile Infantry
Traveller	Game Designers' Workshop	Role-playing game	1977	Star Marines, Terran Confederation Marine Corps, Imperial Marine Force, Solomani Marine Corps, and Zhodani Consular Guard
Space Marines	Fantac/Fantasy Games Unlimited	Wargaming; Tabletop game; Dice game	1977/1980	Terran UnionGuard Heavy Infantry, Azuriach Heavy Infantry
Starfire series	Task Force Games; Starfire Design Studio	Board wargame	1979–present	Federation Navy Marine Corps
Space Marines	Asgard Miniatures	Science Fiction Miniature Line	1982–present	Space Marine/Space Trooper. The miniatures in this line were created for use with Laserburn and are currently available through Alternative Armies
Star Frontiers	TSR, Inc.	Role-playing game	1982–1985	Space Marine. The career name for NPCs with a focus in beam weapons.
Metroid series	Nintendo	Action-adventure game	1986–present	Galactic Federation Marine Corps/07th Platoon
Princess Ryan's Star Marines	Simulations Tacticals (SIMTAC)	1/285 Scale Tabletop Miniatures Game	1986	Princess Ryan's Star Marines
Warhammer 40,000 series	Games Workshop	Miniature wargaming; Tabletop game; Dice game	1987–present	Adeptus Astartes (Imperial Space Marine) Chapters, and also, to an extent, Chaos Space Marines.
Wing Commander franchise	Origin Systems, Inc.	Space combat simulation	1990–1999	Terran Confederation Marine Corps
Duke Nukem series	3D Realms	First-person shooter; Platform	1991–present	Earth Defense Forces (EDF)
Doom series	id software	First-person shooter	1993–present	
Marathon series	Bungie	First-person shooter	1994–present	UESC (Unified Earth Space Council) Marines
Quake series	id software	First-person shooter	1996–present	SMC (Space Marine Corps) Marines, GDF (Global Defence Force)
Unreal series	Epic Games	First-person shooter	1998–present	UMS (Unified Military Services)
Outwars	Microsoft	Third-person shooter; Tactical shooter	1998	Colonial Marines
Battlezone	Activision	first-person shooter; real-time strategy	1998	National Space Defense Force (NSDF), Cosmos Colonist Army/Communist Cosmonaut Army (CCA), Chinese Red Army (CRA), International Space Defence Force (ISDF)
StarCraft series	Blizzard Entertainment	Real-time strategy	1998–present	Confederate Marine Corps, the Dominion Marine Corps, the Alliance Marine Corps, the Alpha Corps, the United Earth Directorate Powered Infantry and numerous more
Ground Control	Sierra On-Line	Real-time tactics	2000	Crayven Corporation's Marines
Halo series	Xbox Game Studios	First-person shooter; Real-time strategy	2001–present	United Nations Space Command Marine Corps and the elite Orbital Drop Shock Trooper divisions (special forces qualified for drop pod insertion).
Red Faction series	THQ	First-person shooter; Third-person shooter	2001–present	Earth Defence Marine Corps (E.D.M.C.) and Earth Naval Guard (E.N.G.)
Natural Selection	Unknown Worlds Entertainment	First-person shooter; Real-time strategy	2002–2007	Frontiersmen (human space marines)
TimeSplitters 2	Eidos Interactive	First-person shooter	2002	Space Marines (Sergeant Cortez and Corporal Hart)
Killzone series	SCEE	First-person shooter	2003–present	Interplanetary Strategic Alliance Marines
TimeSplitters: Future Perfect	Electronic Arts	First-person shooter	2005	Space Marines (Sergeant Cortez) (This got changed during scripting as it was pointed out that Space Marine might infringe on Games Workshop name.)
Mass Effect series	Microsoft Game Studios; Electronic Arts	Action role-playing game; Third-person shooter	2007–present	designated personnel of the Systems Alliance Navy (no branch independence)
Dead Space series	Electronic Arts	Survival horror; Third-person shooter	2008–present	USM Marine Corps (a branch of the Earth Defense Force)
Turok	Touchstone Interactive	Action game; First-person shooter	2008	Marines (also referred to as Commandos)
Eat Lead: The Return of Matt Hazard	D3 Publisher	Action game; Third-person shooter	2009	Space Marines
Fallout 3: Mothership Zeta	Bethesda	Role playing game; First-person shooter	2009	American army medic Eliot Tecorian and the two surviving members of his squad are abducted by aliens, and assist the Vault Dweller in hijacking the spaceship. The player can also equip themself with pre-war power armor similar in appearance to the Marauder armor worn by the Mobile Infantry.
Alien Swarm	Valve	Action game; Third-person shooter; Shoot-em-up; Top-down	2010	Space Marines – the game can be single player or 4 players co-op. There are 4 classes with 2 characters for each class: Officer, Special Weapons, Medic and Tech.
Warhammer 40,000 Armageddon	Slitherine	Turn-based strategy	2014	Space Marines
Wolfenstein: The New Order	Bethesda	Action-adventure, first-person shooter	2014	Weltraumsoldaten, Weltraummarinesoldaten
Helldivers	Arrowhead Game Studios	First-person shooter, Shoot'em up	2015–present	Helldivers, Super Earth Defense Force
Bombshell	3D Realms	multidirectional shooter	2016	Global Defence Force (GDF)
The Outer Worlds	Obsidian Entertainment	First-person shooter, Role-playing video game	2019	Mardets, short for Marine Detachment.
