= Hangfire =

2000 novel by Dan Cragg

- Author: Dan Cragg & David Sherman
- Cover artist: Jean Targete
- Language: English
- Series: StarFist
- Genre: Science fiction
- Publisher: Del Rey Books
- Publication date: 2000
- Publication place: United States
- Media type: Print (paperback)
- Pages: 346
- ISBN: 0-345-43592-3
- OCLC: 46644705
- LC Class: CPB Box no. 1874 vol. 9
- Preceded by: TechnoKill
- Followed by: Kingdom's Swords

Hangfire is the sixth novel of the military science fiction StarFist Saga by American writers David Sherman and Dan Cragg. This installment of Starfist contains three significant and independent plots, one involving members of third platoon, Company L, another involving Brigadier Sturgeon, the FIST commander, and finally one where the "Skink" alien race conducts operations of their own.

== Plot summary ==
The Confederation of Human Worlds comprises about two hundred semi-autonomous settled worlds. The inter and intra-world disputes are settled by the powerful Confederation military; amongst them are the Confederation Marines, led by FISTs (Fleet Initial Strike Teams).

Three Marines of Third Platoon, Company L, 34th FIST, are sent on a secret mission to the mob-controlled resort world of Havanagas. Lance Corporals Claypoole and Dean – under the command of Corporal Pasquin – are to find proof of mob control – proof that Confederation law enforcement agents have not been able to secure – so that the gangsters can be brought to justice.

Brigadier Sturgeon, the FIST commander, ostensibly goes on leave. Instead of vacationing he travels to Marine Corps Headquarters on Earth to find out why 34th FIST seems to have been quietly "quarantined," with nobody being rotated out of the unit, even though it is considered a hardship post. This potentially career-endangering "back channel" trip reveals some very scary facts.

As this happens, the Skinks, an extraterrestrial enemy previously fought by the Marines, land on a world only partially explored by humans and find a pre-technological sentient race. The Skinks immediately take captives to use as laborers. The planet is apparently a staging base for the Skinks' invasion of Kingdom, a human occupied world.

== Reception ==
Don D'Amassa in his review for Science Fiction Chronicle said "the previous volumes in this series have been readable, and this one was divergent enough that it actually held my interest throughout." Author Colin Salt gave it a negative review, however, ranking it as "one of the lower entries in the wildly uneven Starfist series", justifying it primarily by saying that "What should be a romp through Mobster Murderworld ends up treating that tamely while devoting a ton of time and space to uninteresting aliens [...] to set up an uninteresting arc".

The book was listed as a best seller in July 2001 by science fiction magazine Locus.
