= Double Jeopardy (StarFist novel) =

2008 novel by David Sherman

- First edition
- Author: David Sherman & Dan Cragg
- Language: English
- Series: StarFist
- Genre: Military science fiction
- Publisher: Del Rey Books
- Publication date: December 29, 2009
- Publication place: United States
- Media type: Print
- Pages: 368
- ISBN: 978-0345501011
- OCLC: 326509271
- Dewey Decimal: 813/.54
- LC Class: 2009042831
- Preceded by: Wings of Hell

Double Jeopardy is a science fiction novel by American writers David Sherman and Dan Cragg; it was released on December 29, 2009. It is set in the 25th Century in Sherman and Cragg's StarFist Saga. It is the 14th and last novel of the series; shortly after the manuscript was submitted to its publisher, Del Rey, the authors were notified of its cancellation.

== Plot summary ==
The Confederation of Human Worlds comprises about two hundred semi-autonomous settled worlds. Some of those worlds are rich and powerful, others are not. For years now, human worlds have been raided by a secretive and militarized extraterrestrial society, the Skinks, whose existence has just been made public. The Confederation's struggle against them has been so far led by the Confederation Marines, specifically the 34th FIST (Fleet Initial Strike Team), one of the first units to establish contact with them.

Reports start to come in from the isolated world of Ishtar - mysterious deaths amongst colonists point to an invasion by the alien menace, and the 34th FIST is quickly deployed. In Ishtar, they find no Skinks - instead, they stumble upon a war amongst illegal human miners and Fuzzies, a never-before seen alien race. The contact with them is friendly, leading to more unanswered questions about humankind's position in the universe.

== Reception ==
Double Jeopardy received mostly positive reviews. Publishers Weekly classified it as "quality military SF" and praised its realism; the writer Thomas Evans said that it was a "good book within the genre", but criticized the "huge cast of characters". Roland Green reviewing for Booklist said it was the "best book in the series since Lazarus Rising (2003)".
