= Wings of Hell =

2008 novel by David Sherman

- First edition
- Author: David Sherman & Dan Cragg
- Language: English
- Series: StarFist
- Genre: Science fiction
- Publisher: Del Rey Books
- Publication date: December 8, 2008
- Publication place: United States
- Media type: Print
- ISBN: 978-0-345-50099-1
- OCLC: 261404154
- Dewey Decimal: 813/.54 22
- LC Class: PS3569.H4175 W56 2008
- Preceded by: Firestorm
- Followed by: Double Jeopardy

Wings of Hell is a science fiction novel by American writers David Sherman and Dan Cragg; it was released on December 30, 2008. It is set in the 25th Century in Sherman and Cragg's StarFist Saga. It is the 13th novel of the series, followed by Double Jeopardy.

== Plot summary ==
The Confederation of Human Worlds comprises about two hundred semi-autonomous settled worlds. Some of those worlds are rich and powerful, others are not. For years now, human worlds have been raided by a secretive and militarized extraterrestrial society, the Skinks. Moreover, the Confederation is still reeling from a recently concluded campaign versus separatists in the frontier regions.

Soon, reports come from the newly established colony world of Haulover - the Skinks have invaded the planet in full force, with spaceships, aircraft, and massive anti-air cannons with seemingly infinite range. The Confederation armed forces are deployed, led by Marine FISTs (Fleet Initial Strike Teams). The book's focus is on Third Platoon, Company L, 34th FIST, the unit which has the most experience in confronting the Skinks. After some lopsided initial engagements, the humans learn to deal with the new alien weapons and, taking the initiative, soon deal with the enemy's military capacity both in land (spearheaded by daring raids by the 34th FIST) and in orbit. As all this goes on, a political crisis in the Confederation develops and is abated, as pro-Armed Forces president Chang-Sturdevant manages to get reelected despite the opposition's underhanded maneuvers.

== Reception ==
Wings of Hell received mixed reviews. Andy Whitaker from SFCrowsnest affirmed that on the whole he was disappointed with the book, which had "close to the worst aliens I've come across"; he also claimed that reading it was "a bit of a chore". Publishers Weekly claimed, however, that the novel is "rousing", and that there were some "intriguing interstellar parallels to the Pacific campaigns of WWII". Roland Green reviewing for Booklist said, similarly, that it was "an impressive addition [...] to a fine series."
