= Flashfire =

Flashfire may refer to:

- Flashfire (film), 1993 film starring Billy Zane and Louis Gossett Jr.
- Flashfire (Stark novel), 2000 Parker novel by Richard Stark
- Flashfire (novel), 2006 science fiction novel by David Sherman and Dan Cragg
- Flashfire (comics), fictional character in the Marvel Universe
- Flash fire, sudden, intense fire caused by the ignition of flammable substances in the air
