= Firestorm (novel) =

2007 novel by David Sherman

- First edition
- Author: David Sherman & Dan Cragg
- Language: English
- Series: StarFist
- Genre: Science fiction
- Publisher: Del Rey Books
- Publication date: June 26, 2007
- Publication place: United States
- Media type: Print (hardback & paperback)
- Pages: 320
- ISBN: 978-0-345-46055-4
- OCLC: 122931089
- Preceded by: Flashfire
- Followed by: Wings of Hell

Firestorm is a science fiction novel by American writers David Sherman and Dan Cragg. It is set in the 25th Century in Sherman and Cragg's StarFist saga. Firestorm concludes the Ravenette campaign for the 34th FIST and Marine Force Recon (introduced in Backshot and expanded in Recoil, two books of a three book sub series).

== Plot summary ==
The Confederation of Human Worlds comprises about two hundred semi-autonomous settled worlds. Some of those worlds are rich and powerful, others are not. A coalition of a dozen lesser worlds has decided to secede from the Confederation, leading to a brutal war focused in Ravennette, where a large Army garrison was located.

This book picks up where Flashfire left, as the Marines of the 34th FIST have been decimated by the lengthy and badly-conducted campaign. General Allistair Cazombie, an ally of the Marines and a highly decorated former enlisted man, forcefully removes General Jason Billie from power with the support of the Marines, after these are ordered on a mission with the sole purpose of destroying their force - Billie was worried they would steal his glory.

Soon, with reinforcements from orbit, the Marines manage to break out from the base where they had been holed up since the start of the campaign. Victory comes in the following weeks, and is made larger by a political happening - the president of the Confederation announces the existence of an extraterrestrial threat to mankind, the Skinks, which were the motive for Confederation military strengthening in the borderlands.

Jason Billie tries to go to court against the Confederation administration and the generals who deposed him, but loses once the facts are made clear, and commits suicide.

== Reception ==
Publishers Weekly in their review said "readers looking for accounts of futuristic combat that depict realistically the psychology of men in battle need look no further." Roland Green reviewing for Booklist said "more of the usual good stuff for military sf buffs from two master depicters of grunts at war, which Sherman and Cragg themselves once were."
