= Top Sergeant =

Top Sergeant is an alternate term for First sergeant or for the most senior sergeant in a military unit

It may also refer to:

- Top Sergeant (film), a 1942 American military drama film directed by Christy Cabanne
- Top Sergeant (book), a 1992 autobiography of Sergeant Major of the Army William G. Bainbridge
