= Backshot =

Backshot may refer to:

- Backshot wheel, a type of water wheel
- Backshot, a novel by David Sherman and Dan Cragg in the StarFist: Force Recon series
- Backshot, novel by George G. Gilman
- A slang term for doggy style sex or anal sex
