= A World of Hurt =

2004 novel by David Sherman

- First edition
- Author: David Sherman & Dan Cragg
- Cover artist: Mark Harrison
- Language: English
- Series: StarFist
- Genre: Science fiction
- Publisher: Del Rey Books
- Publication date: 2004
- Publication place: United States
- Media type: Print Hardcover and Paperback
- Pages: 312 (Hardcover) and 352 (Paperback)
- ISBN: 0-345-46052-9
- OCLC: 55960871
- Dewey Decimal: 813/.6 22
- LC Class: PS3569.H4175 W67 2004
- Preceded by: Lazarus Rising
- Followed by: Flashfire

A World of Hurt is a science fiction novel by American writers David Sherman and Dan Cragg, the tenth novel in their StarFist series.

== Plot summary ==
A civilian analyst in the Confederation of Human Worlds' Development Control Division of the Department of Colonial Development, Population Control, and Xenobiological Studies notices a peculiar series of incidents on the colony world called Maugham's Station and flags it as having possible military interest. The military does find it of interest—it looks like the work of Skinks, the alien race responsible for an invasion of the planet Kingdom (described in the earlier novels Kingdom's Swords and Kingdom's Fury). The 34th Fleet Initial Strike Team (FIST) is dispatched to investigate the situation on Maugham's Station and, if necessary, drive the Skinks from the planet. Soon the 34th FIST soon finds that the supposed Skinks related attacks are in fact aggressive botanical life that uses natural weapons having an uncanny resemblance to the acid guns of the Skinks.

In other goings on, the space navy of the planet We're Here!, have discovered a surreptitious mining operation taking place on a planet in a neighboring star system, one that they have a claim on. The commander of We're Here!'s navy is delighted to have a chance to make war, and he acts without notifying the civilian government.

== Reception ==
The novel was mostly well received. Publishers Weekly said, for instance, that "you don't have to be a military SF buff to appreciate this entertaining and instructive exercise"; Roland Green, writing for Booklist, meanwhile, said it was "in its own way intelligent and agreeable". Cassada Jackie, writing for the Library Journal, highlighted its "familiar characters and catchy dialog".
