= City of Torment =

2009 novel by Bruce Cordell

- Cover art by Jean Pierre Targete
- Author: Bruce Cordell
- Cover artist: Jean Pierre Targete
- Series: Abolethic Sovereignty
- Genre: Fantasy
- Publisher: Wizards of the Coast
- Publication date: 2009
- Media type: Paperback
- Pages: 320
- ISBN: 978-0-7869-5184-0
- Preceded by: Plague of Spells
- Followed by: Key of Stars

City of Torment is the second novel in the Abolethic Sovereignty series written by Bruce Cordell and published by Wizards of the Coast (WotC) in 2009.

== Plot summary ==
As told in the first book of the series, Plague of Spells, a terrible storm of blue fire, the Spellplague, kills many inhabitants of Faerûn, leaving only a few scarred survivors, among them Raidon Kane. He wakes after eleven years encased in crystal, his family and home destroyed, and finds he now has a sapphire tattoo and strange supernatural powers. Elder evil known as the Abolethic Sovereignty have arisen, and Raidon is one of the few who can fight them.

In City of Torment, Raidon travels to the underground fortress of the slumbering aboleths, intending to kill the Eldest in its sleep. But a warlock, an arch fey, a pirate, and a high priestess of the Abolethic Sovereignty all have their own intentions for the Eldest.

== Publication history ==
The Forgotten Realms fantasy role-playing game campaign setting was first introduced by TSR in 1987, and a large number of novels were published to promote it, notably those by R. A. Salvatore featuring the drow character Drizzt Do'Urden.

WotC took over TSR in 1996, and maintained the Forgotten Realms setting. In 2008, with the release of the 4th edition of Dungeons & Dragons, WotC decided to completely remold the Forgotten Realms for the new edition by inflicting the Spellplague upon the lands, killing off most of the population and giving a darker, more horror-oriented feel to the campaign setting. As Curtis Carbonell noted, the Spellplague acted as "a narrative justification for design changes".

Once again using paperback novels as a promotional tool, WotC commissioned Bruce Cordell to create a trilogy of novels based on this new and darker Forgotten Realms. The result, the Abolethic Sovereignty trilogy, led off with Plague of Spells in 2008, This was followed by City of Torment in 2009, a 320-page paperback featuring cover art by Jean Pierre Targete. The third book of the trilogy, Key of Stars, was published in 2010.

== Reception ==
David Craddock commented, "With City of Torment, Cordell cements himself as one of fantasy's most compelling authors and a boon to the continued allure and lore of the Realms. His voice is fresh, his prose is quick and sharp, and his characters able to feel realized while still leaving a few layers to peel away as the saga hurtles toward its conclusion -- one this reader is eagerly anticipating."
