= Jedi Trial =

2004 novel by Dan Cragg

- Author: David Sherman & Dan Cragg
- Cover artist: Steven D. Anderson
- Language: English
- Series: Canon C
- Subject: Star Wars
- Genre: Science fiction
- Publisher: Del Rey
- Publication date: Hardcover: October 26, 2004; Paperback: May 31, 2005
- Pages: Hardcover: 352; Paperback: 368
- ISBN: 0-345-46115-0
- Preceded by: MedStar II: Jedi Healer
- Followed by: Yoda: Dark Rendezvous

Jedi Trial is a science fiction novel by David Sherman and Dan Cragg, first published by Del Rey in 2004. It is set in the Star Wars galaxy during the Clone Wars.

== Summary ==
This book tells the tale of Jedi Master Nejaa Halcyon and Jedi Padawan Anakin Skywalker trying to rescue an important Republic communications hub from the Separatist Forces, located on the barren planet of Praesitlyn. Halcyon, having previously failed an important mission, is sent as a trial in order for him to regain the Jedi Council's trust. As they had grown close during their time in the Jedi Temple, Halcyon chose Skywalker as his second-in-command against the wishes of the council, making the mission as much a trial for Anakin, as well.

Even before reaching Praesitlyn, Nejaa confesses to Anakin of his violation of the Jedi code, that he has a wife and a son. In turn, Anakin relates about his own forbidden marriage to Padmé Amidala, with both Jedi promising not to reveal their digressions to anyone.

Skywalker and Halcyon lead the Republic reserve forces to reinforce Praesitlyn, and to recover the hostages within the Intergalactic Communications Center from C.I.S. occupation. The opposing C.I.S. forces are commanded by Muun Admiral Pors Tonith of the InterGalactic Banking Clan, under command himself from Asajj Ventress and Sith Lord Count Dooku.

At this time, the Praesitlyn Defense Forces have been overcome, with Trooper Odie Subu and Lieutenant Erk H'Arman the only survivors. The only reason Praesitlyn has not been completely overrun by the C.I.S. is due to intervention by a rogue former Republic officer, Captain Slayke, and his troops, the badly-outnumbered Sons and Daughters of Freedom. Halcyon and Skywalker arrive just in time to relieve Slayke with all available troops, though the situation is still perilous.

Anakin Skywalker is for the first time put in a commanding position, and, while acquitting himself well, clearly shows frustration and an impatience for combat. In addition to Skywalker's issues, the book also deals with attitudes towards clones, and their degree of humanity. We see a general stereotyping that clones are subdegree humans, with their personalities and abilities often not being trusted as much as those of other beings. This can be seen in actions of reconnaissance. where it is clear if Clone Commando CT-19/39 had not been disregarded, he would have been able to relay important information that would have saved hundreds of lives. Instead, only Sergeant Omin L'Loxx was relied upon, resulting in disaster.

With such a disastrous failure, Anakin decides upon a desperate measure, by which he and a small attack group of two troop-transports fly directly to the ICC to rescue the hostages. Skywalker, in his element, destroys almost all droids in his path, leaving the troops behind him in awe, and with nothing to shoot at. Reaching the hostages, Anakin is shocked as a woman reminds him so much of his mother. As she is killed, we see Skywalker become an avenger, treading perilously close to the dark side of the Force. Jedi Master Nejaa Halcyon, as well as Grand Master Yoda – and, indeed Darth Sidious – all feel the disturbances in the Force at this, though only one yet understands their meaning. Anakin's rampage only ends before murdering Pors Tonith, as he hears Qui-Gon Jinn's voice reaching him through the Force, telling him to use the Force for good, not destruction. Although Anakin initially brings himself out of his rage, it is only temporarily suppressed, to be brought out later once again.

Though their objectives had been achieved, as well as Pors Tonith having been captured by Skywalker's actions, the Separatists' relief-fleet arrives under a cloaking device. In the battle, Anakin is again in his element, with Master Halcyon becoming more his wingmate than commander. Skywalker, although being called back, seemingly decides to sacrifice himself in order to destroy the enemy flagship. To Halcyon's horror, Anakin disappears in the blast of the Separatist relief-fleet's explosion. Later, however, in the midst of mourning Anakin and celebrating victory, Skywalker's craft returns, much to everyone's surprise. Anakin later explains his seeming resurrection, saying how he had installed a hyperdrive engine in his starfighter, enabling him to escape from the blast, with his split-second timing, stemming from his immense Force-sensitivity.

On his return to Coruscant, the Jedi Council, overbowed with exceptional reports of Anakin's performance, finally agree to grant him Knighthood in the order.
