= First to Fight =

First to Fight may refer to:

- First to Fight (film), a 1967 American film featuring Gene Hackman
- First to Fight (novel), a novel in the StarFist series by Dan Cragg and David Sherman
- "First to Fight", the motto of the US 24th Infantry Division
- First to Fight: An Inside View of the U.S. Marine Corps, a book by Lieutenant General Victor H. Krulak, USMC
- Close Combat: First to Fight, a squad-based military first-person shooter game created by Destineer Studios
