= Key of Stars =

2010 novel by Bruce Cordell

- Cover of the first edition
- Author: Bruce Cordell
- Cover artist: Jean Pierre Targete
- Language: English
- Series: Abolethic Sovereignty
- Genre: Fantasy novel
- Publisher: Wizards of the Coast
- Publication date: September 2010
- Publication place: United States
- Media type: Print (Paperback)
- Pages: 320
- ISBN: 978-0-7869-5628-9
- Preceded by: City of Torment

Key of Stars is the third and final novel in the Abolethic Sovereignty series written by Bruce Cordell and published in September 2010.

== Plot summary ==
Raidon Kane survived his clash against the eldest aboleth, but came away with his mind shattered. Destiny hands Raidon one last chance to avert the Abolethic Sovereignty's agenda, but only if he can find within himself the strength to care. Raidon, the warlock Japheth, and Anusha, a young woman whose dreams are made real, must find the Key of Stars before it is used to open the Far Manifold and unleashes a realm of chaos upon the world. The race takes them through the Fey Wild and beyond the very edge of the Far Realm itself.

== Reception ==
One reviewer described Key of Stars as "...a cornucopia of battle, intrigue, romance, and character advancement; all the ingredients that make a good fantasy novel. The middle might seem slower than the rest depending on your reception to new and infrequently visited perspectives, but if you're reading Key of Stars, you've likely experienced the first two books and will not be disappointed with the time you've invested in the story.
