= Plague of Spells =

2008 Fantasy novel by Bruce Cordell

- Cover of the first edition
- Author: Bruce Cordell
- Cover artist: Jean Pierre Targete
- Series: Abolethic Sovereignty
- Genre: Fantasy
- Publisher: Wizards of the Coast
- Publication date: December 2008
- Media type: Paperback
- Pages: 320
- ISBN: 978-0-7869-4965-6
- Followed by: City of Torment

Plague of Spells is a fantasy novel written by Bruce Cordell and published by Wizards of the Coast (WotC) in 2008, that is set in the Forgotten Realms, a campaign setting for the fantasy role-playing game Dungeons & Dragons. It is the first book in the Abolethic Sovereignty trilogy.

== Plot summary ==
A terrible storm of blue fire, the Spellplague, kills many inhabitants of Faerûn, leaving only a few scarred survivors, among them Raidon Kane. He wakes after eleven years encased in crystal, his family and home destroyed, and finds he now has a sapphire tattoo and strange supernatural powers. Elder evil known as the Abolethic Sovereignty has arisen, and is using an artifact called the Dreamheart to tempt and corrupt Spellplague survivors.

Raidon must seek out a weapon forged by those who fought the Sovereignty before him, but to do so, must enter the Plaguewrought Lands, as well as seek out uncorrupted allies.

== Publication history ==
The Forgotten Realms fantasy role-playing game campaign setting was first introduced by TSR in 1987, and a large number of novels were published to promote it, notably those by R. A. Salvatore featuring the drow character Drizzt Do'Urden.

WotC took over TSR in 1996, and maintained the Forgotten Realms setting. In 2008, WotC decided to completely remold the Forgotten Realms by inflicting the Spellplague upon the lands, killing off most of the population and giving a darker, more horror-oriented feel to the campaign setting. As Curtis Carbonell noted, the Spellplague acted as "a narrative justification for design changes".

Once again using paperback novels as a promotional tool, WotC commissioned Bruce Cordell to create a trilogy of novels based on this new and darker Forgotten Realms. The result, the Abolethic Sovereignty trilogy, led off with Plague of Spells in 2008, featuring cover art by Jean Pierre Targete. This was followed by City of Torment in 2009, and Key of Stars in 2010.

== Reception ==
Fantastic Fiction characterized this as "Lovecraftian horror in Faerûn!" and commended it for "showcasing one of the most fascinating new aspects of the changed face of Faerûn ... packed with exciting battles, wizardry, and monsters."

John Ottinger liked aspects of the book, commenting, "Cordell doesn't do what others do and simply translate a game to storybook form. He goes deeper, giving his characters motivations, fears, reactions that are true to the story as presented. It is not all hack and slash (though there is plenty of that) but full of characters I came to like." Ottinger concluded, "I recommend Plague of Spells for any reader. Forgotten Realms fans will likely read this novel without my recommendation anyway. For those of you who aren't, this is a good opportunity to break into a vastly changed Realms, one that requires very little, almost no knowledge of what came before to enjoy it."
