= Flashfire (novel) =

2006 novel by David Sherman

- Author: David Sherman & Dan Cragg
- Language: English
- Series: StarFist
- Genre: Science fiction
- Publisher: Del Rey Books
- Publication date: 2006
- Publication place: United States
- Media type: Print (hardcover)
- Pages: 349
- ISBN: 0-345-46054-5
- OCLC: 60791720
- Dewey Decimal: 813/.54 22
- LC Class: PS3569.H4175 F57 2006
- Preceded by: A World of Hurt
- Followed by: Firestorm

Flashfire is a science fiction novel by American writers David Sherman and Dan Cragg published in 2006. It is set in the 25th Century in Sherman and Cragg's StarFist series.

== Plot summary ==
The Confederation of Human Worlds comprises about two hundred semi-autonomous settled worlds. Some of those worlds are rich and powerful, others are not. A coalition of a dozen lesser worlds, tired of being second class citizens, decides to secede from the Confederation. What they do not know is the threat of an alien species known as the Skinks hangs over the entire confederation. The Skink Threat is top secret, no citizens know of them. Ever since the discovery of these aliens, the Confederation has beefed up its defences on the out lying colonies. On Ravenette, one of the Coalition worlds, protesters gather at the main gate of the Confederation army base. Someone unknown shoots into the crowd, killing a protester and setting off a bloody riot that kills many civilians and soldiers. The Coalition started the riot and provoked the soldiers even though the soldiers did not shoot into the crowd, news networks say otherwise. The Coalition declares war, and brings all its military might against the Confederation forces on Ravenette—banking on the likelihood that they will achieve victory before reinforcements arrive, and that the Confederation will agree to negotiate a peaceable parting. They guessed wrong. An army division and 34th FIST are soon on the scene, holding the line until more reinforcements arrive. But matters get worse when General Jason Billie is given command of the Confederation forces. General Billie not only has no combat command experience, he hates Marines.

== Reception ==
The novel was mostly well received. Publishers Weekly said in their review that "this book not only entertains but makes the reader reconsider the costs of government secrecy." Tom Russo said in his review for Entertainment Weekly that "the authors, former military men, convincingly relay troop maneuvering—to the point that it frequently smothers the action." Roland Green reviewing for Booklist said "Sherman and Cragg's justifiably popular Starfist series continues with a vivid depiction of ground combat worthy of ranking with Heinlein's classic Starship Troopers (1953)."
