= Silas L. Copeland =

Third Sergeant Major of the US Army

Silas Lee Copeland
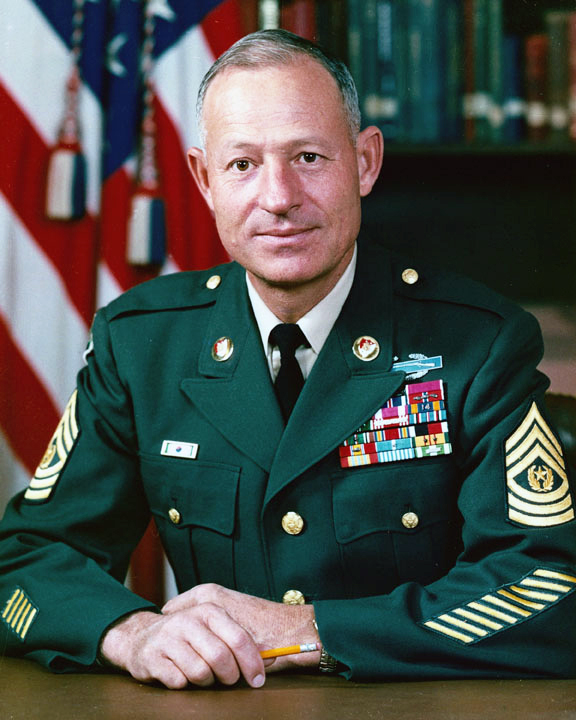
- Sergeant Major of the Army Silas L. Copeland
- Born: April 2, 1920; Embryfield, Texas, U.S.
- Died: December 4, 2001 (aged 81); Conroe, Texas, U.S.
- Burial place: Oakwood Cemetery, Huntsville, Texas, U.S.
- Military career
- Allegiance: United States of America
- Branch: United States Army
- Service years: 1942–1973
- Rank: Sergeant Major of the Army
- Conflicts: World War II; Korean War; Vietnam War
- Awards: Army Distinguished Service Medal; Legion of Merit; Distinguished Flying Cross; Bronze Star Medal (4); Meritorious Service Medal; Air Medal (14); Army Commendation Medal (4)

Silas Lee Copeland (April 2, 1920 – December 4, 2001) was a United States Army soldier who served as the third Sergeant Major of the Army. He was sworn in on 1 October 1970, and served until June 1973.

== Early life ==
Copeland was born in Embryfield, Texas (now Staley, Texas), on 2 April 2, 1920.

== Military career ==
Copeland was a 22-year-old World War II draftee on 28 October 1942. He completed basic training in Florida and then was assigned to Biggs Army Airfield, Texas and the 538th Heavy Bomber Group as a refueling specialist.

He was retrained as a tank commander and assigned to the 2nd Armored Division in 1944 and by January 1945 was assigned to Company E, 66th Armored Regiment, 2nd Armored Division, as a tank commander and later a tank platoon sergeant. He completed occupation duty in Germany in late 1945, he was stationed at Fort Hood, Texas, where he became Operations and Intelligence Sergeant of the 67th Tank Battalion and 82d Reconnaissance Battalion. In 1950 he was transferred to the 2d Battalion, 8th Cavalry Regiment, 1st Cavalry Division, then located in Japan. From there, his unit was moved into Korea on 18 July 1950, making the landing by assault boats. He served as the Reconnaissance and Intelligence Platoon Sergeant and Battalion Operations Sergeant.

From 1951 to 1953, Copeland was assigned to Senior Reserve Officers' Training Corps duty at Texas A&M University. In 1953 was assigned to the 2d Battalion, 22d Infantry Regiment, Germany, as a first sergeant. He remained with that unit until November 1954 when he was reassigned to the 1st Armored Division at Fort Hood, Texas as Operations Sergeant and sergeant major of the 4th Tank Battalion. In 1957 he was selected as an instructor, Senior Reserve Officers' Training Corps, Centenary College of Louisiana at Shreveport, Louisiana. Upon completion of his tour of duty at Centenary, he was assigned to the 3d Reconnaissance Squadron, 8th Cavalry, 8th Infantry Division in Germany as a first sergeant and quickly to sergeant major and remained until he was reassigned to the 2d Armored Division, Fort Hood, Texas in October 1962.

Selected to be the division sergeant major in June 1963, Copeland remained in that position until December 1966 when he was transferred to the 2nd Brigade, 4th Armored Division in Erlangen, Germany. He was selected as the division command sergeant major in April 1968 and served in that capacity until July 1969 when he was assigned to the Republic of Vietnam as the division command sergeant major of the 1st Infantry Division (Big Red One). For seven and a half months he performed duties as the division's command sergeant major until the 1st Infantry Division returned from Vietnam. Copeland accompanied the division colors to Fort Riley, Kansas, then returned to Vietnam to complete his tour as command sergeant major of the 4th Infantry Division located in the Central Highlands of Vietnam. Following his return to the United States, Copeland was appointed Sergeant Major of the Army (SMA) on October 1, 1970.

One of his first challenges as the new SMA was not accepting being rated by a colonel on his efficiency reports. As a Command Sergeant Major, he had always been rated by a general officer and refused, saying he would rather be reassigned. It was determined that the SMA would not be rated at all. He also set a goal to change the perception of the office of the SMA as not a spy or whistle blower for the Pentagon. The transition to the all volunteer force would be a main focus of his time as the SMA. He wanted the NCO corps to focus on fundamentals and professionalism.

== Later life ==
Copeland died on 4 December 2001, and was buried in Oakwood Cemetery, Huntsville, Texas.

== Awards and decorations ==
Combat Infantryman Badge

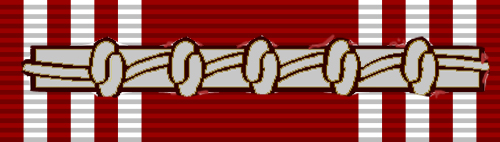
| Army Distinguished Service Medal |
| Legion of Merit |
| Distinguished Flying Cross |
| Bronze Star Medal with three oak leaf clusters |
| Meritorious Service Medal |
| Air Medal with award numeral 14 |
| Army Commendation Medal with three oak leaf clusters |
| Army Good Conduct Medal with 5 silver loops |
| American Campaign Medal |
| European-African-Middle Eastern Campaign Medal with one service star |
| World War II Victory Medal |
| Army of Occupation Medal with Germany Clasp |
| National Defense Service Medal with oak leaf cluster |
| Korean Service Medal with five service stars |
| Vietnam Service Medal with two service stars |
| Vietnam Armed Forces Honor Medal, 2nd Class |
| Korean Presidential Unit Citation |
| United Nations Korea Medal |
| Vietnam Campaign Medal |

- 5 Overseas Service Bars.
- 10 Service stripes.

Military offices
| Preceded by George W. Dunaway | Sergeant Major of the Army; 1970—1973 | Succeeded by Leon L. Van Autreve |
