= Lazarus Rising (novel) =

2003 novel by David Sherman and Dan Cragg

Lazarus Rising (book)
- First edition
- Author: David Sherman & Dan Cragg
- Cover artist: Mark Harrison
- Language: English
- Series: StarFist
- Genre: Science fiction
- Publisher: Del Rey Books
- Publication date: 2003
- Publication place: United States
- Media type: Print (paperback)
- Pages: 368
- ISBN: 0-345-44373-X
- OCLC: 57396917
- Preceded by: Kingdom's Fury
- Followed by: A World of Hurt

Lazarus Rising is the ninth novel of the military science fiction StarFist Saga by American writers David Sherman and Dan Cragg.

== Plot summary ==
This novel continues the situation on the planet Kingdom from the previous novel, Kingdom's Fury. Dominic DeTomas, formerly head of the secret police of Kingdom, is now dictator and has put together a new fascist government that strongly resembles that of Nazi Germany. DeTomas's policies engendered resentment among certain parts of the populace, and this festers into an uprising. While the mild-mannered inhabitants of Kingdom might not expect to succeed against an implacably violent police state, the uprising is advised and led by an amnesiac Confederation Marine who had been captured by the alien Skinks and later released when the Skinks were driven off Kingdom.

== Reception ==
Regina Schroeder in her review for Booklist described the book as "compelling military sf with a young romance that will hook teens." Jackie Cassada in her review for Library Journal said that the book "provides a fast-paced tale of military heroics and personal courage for fans of sf military fiction." Peter Cannon in his review for Publishers Weekly said that "the authors have avoided the implausible scenarios and interservice rivalries of some past volumes. This is state-of-the-art military SF."
