= Leon L. Van Autreve =

Fourth Sergeant Major of the US Army

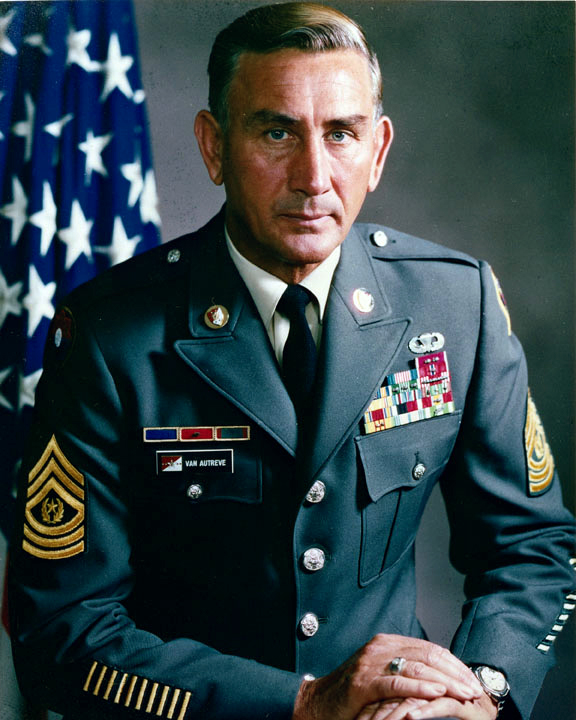
- Sergeant Major of the Army Leon L. Van Autreve
- Born: January 29, 1920; Eeklo, Belgium
- Died: March 14, 2002 (aged 82); San Antonio, Texas, United States
- Military career
- Allegiance: United States
- Branch: United States Army
- Service years: 1941–1945; 1948–1975
- Rank: Sergeant Major of the Army
- Conflicts: World War II; Vietnam War
- Awards: Army Distinguished Service Medal; Legion of Merit (3); Soldier's Medal; Bronze Star Medal (2); Air Medal (2); Army Commendation Medal (4)

Leon L. Van Autreve (January 29, 1920 – March 14, 2002) was a United States Army soldier who served as the fourth Sergeant Major of the Army. He was sworn in on 1 July 1973, and served until June 1975.

== Early life and education ==
Van Autreve was born in Eeklo, Belgium, on 29 January 1920. His family moved to the United States while he was a child settled in Delphos, Ohio.

Van Autreve attended George Washington University, University of Toledo, University of Maryland and Alaska Methodist University, and was a member of Phi Alpha Theta.

== Military career ==
Van Autreve enlisted in the Ohio National Guard in 1938 serving in Headquarters Co., 148th Infantry Regt. He was assigned to be a company clerk. He served until 1940 when got a railroad job.

Van Autreve entered the United States Army in August 1941. After basic training at Fort Belvoir, he was sent to Fort Bragg and assigned to the 15th Engineer Bn., 9th Infantry Div. He was promoted to sergeant and attached to the 60th Infantry RCT and was sent to learn demolitions.

He served overseas with the 9th Infantry Division and participated in the invasion of Port Lyautey, Morocco. He redeployed to England and landed in Normandy four days after D-Day. He was discharged in August 1945 and enlisted again in March 1948. After a tour in Böblingen, Germany from 1950 to 1954, he served as an instructor with the Reserve Officer Training Corps (ROTC) at the University of Toledo until 1958. From ROTC duty he was assigned to Continental Army Command Armor Board at Fort Knox, Kentucky, where he was in the first group of E-8's promoted to the new rank. Remaining at Knox until reassignment to South Korea in 1960. Upon completion of his tour in South Korea, Van Autreve returned to Fort Belvoir and was promoted to sergeant major in 1962. He served as sergeant major of the 91st Engineer Battalion from 1962 until 1963.

From 1963 to 1964, Van Autreve was stationed in Indonesia training the Indonesian Air Force alongside Russian advisors. From 1964 to 1967 he was stationed in West Germany, 317th Engineer Battalion, and 1967 to 1969 in South Vietnam with the 20th Engineer Brigade. In July 1969 he was selected for assignment to Alaska as a command sergeant major - and at 52 years old he completed parachute training just like the men under his command.

=== Sergeant Major of the Army ===
Interviewed by the Chief of Staff, General Creighton W. Abrams in 1973. During this interview Van Autreve expressed increasing the standards of the army's non-commissioned officer (NCO) corps as his highest priority. Upon swearing in, the new Sergeant Major worked to rejuvenate the NCO Corps, Van Autreve gave NCOs more voice in command decisions, reduced the army's reliance on soldiers' councils, increased professional standards for NCOs, developed the Noncommissioned Officer Education System, and encouraged NCOs to have the moral courage to police their own ranks.

He also worked to decrease the number of military specializations (MOS) in the army, so that each one would be broader and encompass more expertise. He also led the creation of the Enlisted Personnel Management System (EPMS) to help focus career guidance for enlisted soldiers. He retired on 30 June 1975.

== Later life and legacy ==
In 1994, the Sergeant Audie Murphy Club designated Fort Sam Houston, Texas, as the SMA Van Autreve Chapter.

Van Autreve died on 14 March 2002, in San Antonio, Texas and was buried at Fort Sam Houston National Cemetery.

== Awards and decorations ==
Basic Parachutist Badge

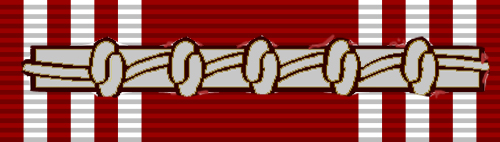
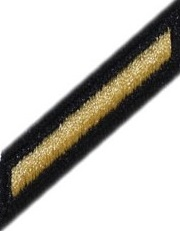
Army Distinguished Service Medal
Legion of Merit with two oak leaf clusters
Soldier's Medal
Bronze Star Medal with oak leaf cluster
Air Medal with award numeral 2
Army Commendation Medal with three oak leaf clusters
Presidential Unit Citation
Meritorious Unit Commendation with oak leaf cluster
Army Good Conduct Medal with five silver loops
American Defense Service Medal
American Campaign Medal
European-African-Middle Eastern Theater Medal with six campaign stars and arrowhead device
World War II Victory Medal
Army of Occupation Medal
National Defense Service Medal with oak leaf cluster
Vietnam Service Medal with six campaign stars
Armed Forces Reserve Medal
Republic of Vietnam Civil Actions Medal Unit Citation
Republic of Vietnam Campaign Medal
10 Overseas Service Bars.
10 Service stripes.

Military offices
Preceded by Silas L. Copeland	Sergeant Major of the Army; 1973–1975	Succeeded by William G. Bainbridge
