= Top Sergeant (book) =

1995 autobiography of William Bainbridge

Top Sergeant: The Life and Times of Sergeant Major of the Army William G. Bainbridge
- First edition
- Author: William G. Bainbridge, Dan Cragg
- Language: English
- Genre: Autobiography
- Publisher: Fawcett
- Publication date: 1995
- Publication place: United States
- ISBN: 0-449-90892-5

Top Sergeant: The Life and Times of Sergeant Major of the Army William G. Bainbridge (ISBN 0-449-90892-5) is the autobiography of American soldier William G. Bainbridge, the fifth man to serve as Sergeant Major of the Army. This memoir was co-authored by Dan Cragg, also a retired Sergeant Major. It was published in 1995 by Fawcett.
