= George W. Dunaway =

Second Sergeant Major of the US Army (1922-2008)

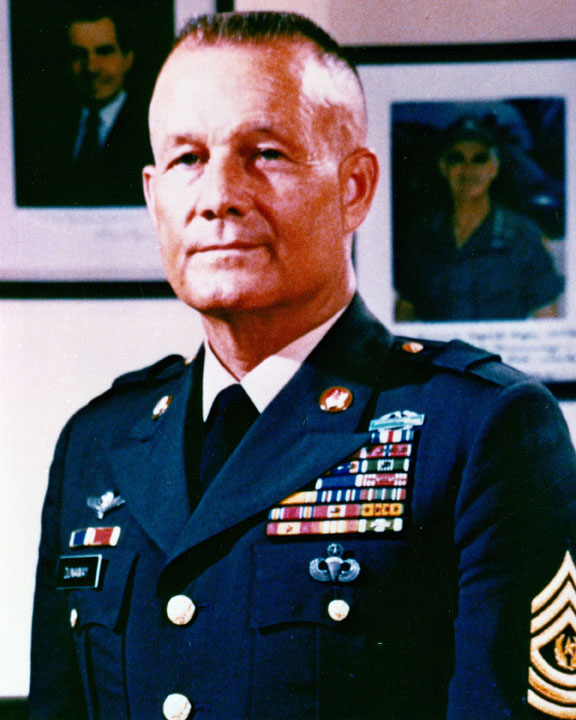
- Sergeant Major of the Army George W. Dunaway
- Born: July 24, 1922; Richmond, Virginia, U.S.
- Died: February 6, 2008 (aged 85); Las Vegas, Nevada, U.S.
- Burial place: Arlington National Cemetery
- Military career
- Allegiance: United States
- Branch: United States Army
- Service years: 1943–1970
- Rank: Sergeant Major of the Army
- Conflicts: World War II; Vietnam War
- Awards: Army Distinguished Service Medal; Silver Star; Legion of Merit; Bronze Star Medal (4); Air Medal (11); Army Commendation Medal (2); Purple Heart

George W. Dunaway (July 24, 1922 – February 6, 2008) was a United States Army soldier who served as the second Sergeant Major of the Army (SMA). He was sworn in on September 1, 1968, and served until his term ended in September 1970.

== Early life ==
Dunaway was born in Richmond, Virginia, on July 24, 1922.

== Military career ==
In January 1940, Dunaway enlisted in the Virginia National Guard with Co. A, 176th Lt. Infantry Regt., 29th Infantry Div. as a rifleman. He joined the regular army in February 1941 and was sent to Fort Meade, Maryland for 18 weeks of combat training. He then volunteered for airborne training. He also attended pathfinder school and glider training.

After attending the various schools in August 1943, Dunaway remained at Fort Benning, Georgia, as an Airborne School Instructor until January 1945 when he joined the 517th Parachute Regimental Combat Team in France as a platoon sergeant fighting in the Battle of the Bulge. He returned to Fort Benning in December 1945 with assignment to the 501st Parachute Infantry Battalion, where he served as first sergeant of Company A. (Inactivated in Germany on 20 August 1945, the 501st Parachute Infantry Regiment was reactivated at Fort Benning from 1 August 1946 to 23 November 1948 as the 501st Parachute Infantry Battalion.) In March 1948, Dunaway was reassigned to the 82d Airborne Division at Fort Bragg, North Carolina. There he became a member of the 505th Airborne Infantry Regiment as Operations Sergeant, ascending to the regimental sergeant major position in 1952.

In early 1954, Dunaway transferred to the 187th Airborne Regimental Combat Team as the Combat Team Sergeant Major. He continued in that position for seven years, during which he saw the lineage of the unit reorganized and redesignated as the 187th Infantry, when the 101st Airborne Division was reactivated on September 21, 1956, at Fort Campbell, Kentucky, which included the 2d Airborne Battle Group, 187th Infantry as one of the division's five battle groups. Departing Fort Campbell in 1961, he reported to the 1st Special Forces Group, 1st Special Forces in United States Army Pacific and later moved to the 5th Special Forces Group in Vietnam, where he remained until June 1967.

Returning to the United States, Dunaway re-joined the 101st Airborne Division as it prepared to move to Vietnam in the largest unit deployment by air in the history of the Vietnam War. Dunaway arrived in Vietnam with the commanding general's command group on December 13, 1967. In February 1968, he moved to Camp Eagle in the I Corps Tactical Zone with the division, where he remained until July 1968 when he was selected as the second Sergeant Major of the Army.

He was sworn in on 1 September 1968 and began working on his priorities - improving the professionalism of the NCO corps, development of career enlisted soldiers, and improving the military education of enlisted soldiers. Dunaway was able to gain control of the appointment of Sergeants Major of the major commands through the Office of the SMA. He also convinced General William Westmoreland to limit the Sergeant Major of the Army's (SMA) length of term to two years and helped create a board that would select the top candidates to replace the SMA. He retired on 30 September 1970.

== Later life ==
Dunaway died on February 6, 2008, in Las Vegas, Nevada. He was buried in Arlington National Cemetery on March 19, 2008, with full military honors.

== Awards and decorations ==
Combat Infantry Badge, 2 awards
Master Parachutist Badge
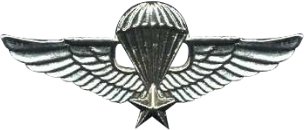
Vietnam Parachutist Badge

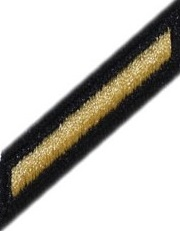
| Army Distinguished Service Medal |
| Silver Star |
| Legion of Merit |
| Bronze Star Medal with Valor device and three oak leaf clusters |
| Air Medal with Valor device and two silver oak leaf clusters |
| Army Commendation Medal with oak leaf cluster |
| Purple Heart |
| Presidential Unit Citation |
| Meritorious Unit Commendation |
| Army Good Conduct Medal (nine awards) |
| American Defense Service Medal |
| American Campaign Medal |
| European-African-Middle Eastern Campaign Medal |
| World War II Victory Medal |
| National Defense Service Medal with oak leaf cluster |
| Vietnam Service Medal with four service stars |
| Vietnam Gallantry Cross with bronze star |
| Vietnam Armed Forces Honor Medal, 2nd class |
| Vietnam Campaign Medal |
| 9 Service stripes. |

Military offices
| Preceded by William O. Wooldridge | Sergeant Major of the Army; 1968–1970 | Succeeded by Silas L. Copeland |
