= Combined Action Program =

United States Marine Corps counterinsurgency program

- Seal of the Combined Action Program
- Active: 1965–1971
- Country: United States
- Allegiance: Department of the Navy
- Branch: United States Marine Corps
- Type: Civic Action

The Combined Action Program was a United States Marine Corps counterinsurgency tool during the Vietnam War. It was widely remembered by the Marine Corps as effective. Operating from 1965 to 1971, it placed a 13-member Marine rifle squad, augmented by a U.S. Navy Corpsman and strengthened by a Vietnamese militia platoon of older youth and elderly men, in or adjacent to a rural Vietnamese hamlet. In most cases, the Popular Forces militia members (Nghia Quan) were residents of the hamlet who were either too young or too old to be drafted into the Army of the Republic of Vietnam (ARVN) or the Regional Forces (Dia Phuong Quan). The entire unit of American Marines and Popular Forces militia members together was designated as a Combined Action Platoon (CAP).

The program was said to have originated as a solution to one Marine infantry battalion's problem of an expanding Tactical Area of Responsibility (TAOR). The concept of combining a squad of Marines with local (PFs) and assigning them a village to protect proved to be a force multiplier.

While the exact implementation varied with the stage of the war and local command variations, the basic model was to combine a Marine squad with local forces to form a village defense platoon. It was effective in denying the enemy a sanctuary at the local village level. The pacification campaign seemed to work under the CAP concept, and the Marines fully embraced it. Objectively, there is no solid proof that the CAP concept was a resounding success; however, subjectively the evidence suggests otherwise.

"Counterinsurgency operations and, in particular, the establishment of a foreign internal defense lends itself for the greatest utility of employing a CAP-style organization. Recent operations in Somalia, Haiti, and Bosnia suggest a CAP-style organization could accomplish the assigned mission." In Iraq and Afghanistan, the Marines reinstituted a variant of the CAP.

== US Marine background for combined programs ==
The CAP concept seems to have been at least partially based on Marine pacification programs in Haiti, Nicaragua, the Dominican Republic, and elsewhere, during the Banana Wars in the late 19th and early 20th centuries. In these programs, Marine units would pacify and administer regions, while providing training and security for local forces and villages. There are also connections to other pacification programs, such as the Philippine Insurrection.

"CAP came naturally for the Marine Corps because counterguerrilla warfare was already part of the USMC heritage. From 1915 to 1934, the Corps had a wealth of experience in foreign interventions fighting guerrillas in Nicaragua, Haiti, and Santo Domingo. For example, the Marines organized and trained the Gendarmerie d'Haiti and the Nacional Dominicana in Haiti and Santo Domingo from 1915 to 1934. In Nicaragua (1926–1933), the Marines organized, trained, and commanded the Guardia Nacional de Nicaragua. These organizations were nonpartisan, native constabularies the Marines commanded until host-nation forces could competently assume command."

"The historical background of Army and Marine counter-insurgency operations, the perceived enemy center of gravity in Vietnam, the strategic aim, and identified critical enemy factors are key to understanding Marine versus Army operational differences on conducting the "Other War." It was these differences and past Marine experience that contributed to the creation of the U.S. Marines' Combined Action Platoon (CAP).

== Initial motivation and organization ==
Opinions differ about exactly how and where Combined Action originated, but it seems to have started in August 1965 as a unit drawn from 3rd Battalion, 4th Marines, under William W. Taylor in the Phu Bai (3/4) area. 3/4's TAOR included six villages and an airfield in a ten square mile area. The unit was overextended, and Taylor's executive officer, suggested that they incorporate local militia units into 3/4's operations. Taylor sent the plan to COL E. B. Wheeler, Commanding Officer (CO) of the 4th Marine Regiment, who forwarded it to the III Marine Amphibious Force (IIIMAF) and Fleet Marine Forces Pacific (FMFPAC). Major General Lew Walt and Lieutenant General Victor Krulak, both of whom had fought in the Banana War, saw the potential value and agreed to the proposal. GEN Nguyễn Văn Chuân, the local Army of the Republic of Vietnam (ARVN) CO, gave Walt control of the Vietnamese platoons near Phu Bai.

Taylor integrated four squads with the local PF units in August 1965. 1stLt Paul Ek was designated as unit commander. (Ek had some training in Vietnamese and counterinsurgency operations.) The Marines were handpicked volunteers from 3/4, carefully screened by the executive officer, Maj Zimmerman.

"Zimmerman drew upon his knowledge of the British Army's experiences in 19th Century India. While studying British procedures of that era, Zimmerman had developed an appreciation for the British propensity towards "Brigading." He knew that by combining a British unit with one or more native units, the British were not only able to increase the size of their army for a comparatively small investment of British troops, but also succeeded in increasing the quality of the native units. This was in Zimmerman's mind when he developed the plan that called for combining a U.S. Marine rifle squad with a PF platoon to form an integrated self-defense force that was able to protect the village from low level Viet Cong threats. The combining of the Marines and the PFs was seen as optimal since both brought unique qualities to the union. The PFs, a poorly trained and often neglected home guard, brought knowledge of people and terrain. They also brought the emotional benefits associated with defending their homes. The Marines brought the benefits of highly trained, well led, aggressive combat troops."

MG Walt formalized the program in February 1967, appointing LtCol William R. Corson as the III MAF deputy director for Combined Action. Corson believed CAP should have a separate chain of command, as it was his opinion that the average battalion commander in Vietnam often didn't know or care how to succeed in combined action, since they were trained and oriented toward offensive large-unit warfare. Corson saw CAP as being mobile and offensive in nature, a concept which later took shape in the mobile CAP units. However, Corson eventually became disenchanted with the conduct of the war.

In spite of this start, CAP became an official "hearts and minds" civic action program, and a school of sorts was eventually established near Da Nang. Training was brief (ten days) and covered a few bare essentials – some Vietnamese phrases, customs, and culture, some civic action precepts, and some military topics. Upon graduation, they were posted to their unit. Eventually they began issuing certificates showing they had graduated. Initially, CAP Marines were issued a special cloth and leather insignia to be worn from the button on the breast pocket of the uniform jacket. These were later replaced by enameled metal pins, also made to be worn on the breast pocket. These, however, were easily lost, and also made a good aiming point for the enemy. They were usually dispensed with on patrols.

The CAP concept in Vietnam was opposed by some who considered "hearts and minds" programs a waste of money, men, and materiel. CAPs were often ignored at best and despised at worst by many area commands and commanders. The prevailing concept was; "Get 'em by the balls and their hearts and minds will follow." This attitude made the CAP Marines' job that much more difficult. However, the concept eventually gained backing from Marine generals Wallace Greene, Victor Krulak and Lew Walt, and with their support, the program expanded. By 1969, despite losses during the 1968 Tet Offensive, the program had expanded to 102 platoons comprising 19 companies and 4 groups, and was even mentioned by President Lyndon B. Johnson in a speech.

CAPs peaked in 1970, with 4 Groups, and 114 companies, spread through the 5 provinces of I Corps.

== Organization ==
While they were not as highly trained for working with host nation personnel as United States Army Special Forces, in 1965 the US Marine Corps Combined Action Program (CAP) took on a role of reinforcing and training local village soldiers, although their basic missions differed substantially. (See Comparison with Non-Marine Programs below for details).

This small program had a number of phases. At its inception it was unofficial and did not have a standard organization.

Some units were called "Joint Action Companies" (JACs). Since, in US military jargon, the word "joint" refers to something pertaining to a combination of forces from different services, and "combined" references a combination of forces from more than one nation, they were, at first, renamed CACs, for "Combined Action Companies."

CAC was changed to CAP, for "Combined Action Platoons". From a purely military standpoint, the units were of platoon, not company, strength. In addition, "cac" is a Vietnamese word for the male generative organ, and the motto included the phrase "suc manh", which means strength. The implications were naturally humorous to the Vietnamese.

In the last phase of development, when Marines were no longer permanently assigned to individual villages, the program was renamed to CUPP, for the "Combined Unit Pacification Program."

CAP has remained the most common name.

=== Initial structure ===
To work with the PFs, III MAF instituted the combined action platoon (CAP), consisting of a 13-man Marine rifle squad (if you were fortunate enough to have 13) augmented by a U.S. Navy Corpsman and paired with a 15- to 30-man PF platoon to defend one particular village (The PF was roughly equivalent to the US National Guard, but with less training and poorer equipment). Each element of the team strengthened the other. The Marines contributed firepower, training, and access to American medical evacuation, artillery and air support. CAPs were generally commanded by a Marine sergeant, but were sometimes commanded by corporals. Patrols were often led by lance-corporals. In some cases such as CAP 1-4-1 in 1969 they were commanded by Lance Corporals.

Combined Action Platoons were frequently semi-isolated and usually independent units. Headquarters CAPs were sometimes "double" CAPs – i.e.; two CAP squads, one comprising the HQ personnel, the other the patrol and defense element. They were eventually organized as platoons, which in turn formed companies, which were organized into Combined Action Groups (CAGs). Eventually there were four CAGs in I Corps.

Originally, the units lived in or near the villages they were affiliated with, eventually in a fortified area. Individual units were assigned to villages in an ostensibly "pacified" area, usually one to a village, though they might serve several other villages in the area. Initially, they were identified by letters and numbers, like line units. Later, numeric designators were used.

=== Reorganization, 1966–67 ===
According to the Command Chronology of HQ 3rd Marine Division (Reinforced) dated 10 November 1966 (provided by Larry Larsen, formerly of Sub Unit #5); "Combined Action Company (in northern I Corps) joined our rolls as Sub Unit #4, an administrative division of HQ 3rd Marine Division (Reinforced). Later, they operated under Sub Unit #5, then returned briefly to SU #4." (Per pertinent USMC Command Chronologies and other official records.) The CC's "Narrative Summary" for December 1966 mentions various branches supporting CACs Alpha (Houng Thuy), Hotel (Phu Loc), and a fourth portion of HQ 3rd MarDiv (Rein) deployed to Khe Sanh in support of the Senior Officer Present.

In southern I Corps, the CAC units (including CAC "India", out of the 1st Bn., 5th Marine Reg., aka; Cottage Tiger Company, from Dec. 1966 until late 1967, west of Tam Ky, along the Tam Ky river), became part of Task Force X-ray (CAC "India", was later in 1967, known as Sub Unit # 2 of Task Force X-ray), a brigade command of the 1st Marine Division, were placed under the administrative control of the 7th Communications Battalion when the Chu Lai TAOR was turned over to the U.S. Army in late April/May, 1967. Each CAC was operationally supported by the nearest American battalion, whether Marine Corps or U.S. Army.

In October 1967, the Combined Action Program underwent a major reorganization with the creation of the 1st Combined Action Group in Chu Lai under Lt.Col. Day, the 2nd Combined Action Group in DaNang and the 3rd Combined Action Group in Phu Bai. All three CAG headquarters reported directly to III MAF.

In February 1967, the Narrative Summary notes the establishment of Sub Unit # 5 at Khe Sanh. (That corresponds roughly to the establishment of Oscar Company, then operating under SU #5.) The report mentions building CAP sites, patrols, and other events, but generally doesn't break them down by company or platoon, with references to Alpha, Hotel, and Papa as separate entities. On 15 July 1967, the CC notes that SU #4 was assigned TAD to III MAF, and on 29 July 1967 that the CAC personnel of SU #5 were reassigned to SU #4. In October 1967, the CC notes that "the 3rd Combined Action Group (CAG) was activated as a separate unit under III MAF (operating out of Phu Bai) effective 1 October 1967. The remaining 1 officer and 16 enlisted in SU #4 continued to function as CAG members until normal attrition reduced them to zero effective 30 November 1967.

=== Roving CAP of 1968 ===
"Beginning in about 1968, the CAP concept underwent some changes. Due to factors such as a high number of attacks and casualties among the static CAPS, the "roving CAP" was started. Roving CAPs had no fixed village – they rotated among two or more villages, and often spent the night in the field. They were very mobile, as opposed to the original static concept, and thus kept the enemy guessing as to where they would be any given night.

"Although CAPs sacrificed a degree of control in the villages, the Marines proceeded with the Mobile CAP concept and by 1970 all CAPs were converted. According to the III MAF staff letter, the justification for this conversion included the facts that; the links with the PFs were still intact; it avoided the "mole" mentality of a static position; it denied the enemy information as to the exact location of the unit, thus, reducing casualties; it allowed the Marines to make better use of supporting arms by being outside the populated areas; and allowed the Marines to concentrate their strength by not requiring the unit to guard a base.

CAPs were also redesignated beginning about the same time. They went from alpha-numeric designations, (such as Oscar-2), to numeric designations, such as 2-7-4. The first digit designated the group (1–4), the second designated the unit (replacing the letters), and the third designated the platoon.

=== 1970 reduction ===
At the beginning of 1970, Marine strength in the Combined Action Program had reached its peak. Four CAGs were in operation:

- 1 CAG under Lieutenant Colonel David F. Seiler, in Quang Tin and Quang Ngai Provinces
- 2 CAG under Lieutenant Colonel Don R. Christensen, in Quang Nam
- 3 CAG under Colonel John B. Michaud, in Thua Thien
- 4 CAG under Lieutenant Colonel John J. Keenan, in Quang Tri

In January 1970, the four CAGs consisted of a total of 42 Marine officers and 2,050 enlisted men, with two naval officers and 126 hospital corpsmen. Organized in 20 CACOs and 114 CAPs, these Americans worked with about 3, 000 RF and PF soldiers. The 2d CAG in Quang Nam, largest of the four, consisted of eight CACOs with 36 CAPs and almost 700 Marine and Navy officers and men, while the smallest, the 4th in Quang Tri, had three CACOs and 18 CAPs.

With the US participation in the war drawing down, III MAF reduced the CAP platoons as it redeployed its regular forces. On 21 September 1970, the Marines officially deactivated CAP as a separate command within III MAF. In its 5 years of operation, CAPs operated in more than 800 hamlets, containing approximately 500,000 Vietnamese civilians in I Corps.

== Comparison with non-Marine programs ==
CAP was one of several programs, during the Vietnam War, where US personnel worked as a team with a local defense group.

"The Marines and the U.S. Military Assistance Command, Vietnam, disagreed on war strategies. U.S. Army leaders [other than Special Forces] wanted to search and destroy the communists in the rural and less-populated areas of South Vietnam; the Marines wanted to clear and hold the populated areas. CAP was a manifestation of the strategy the Marines felt best suited the conditions in Vietnam.

"With U.S. Marines living and fighting side-by-side with the Vietnamese people, CAP seemed to represent an effective, long-term, around-the-clock commitment to combating the Vietnamese communists at the grassroots level. CAP worked well in some locations; elsewhere, its results were transitory at best—with villagers becoming over-reliant on the Marines for security. "

There were some similarities between what CAP did and what was done by the United States Army Special Forces (aka Green Berets). However, most Marine units worked in the lower lying areas with Vietnamese RF / PF units, while Special Forces tended to work in more remote areas using a variety of troops, including indigenous minorities such as the Sino-Vietnamese Nung and Dega (aka "Montagnard") tribesmen. (An exception to this pattern was Oscar Company, which was stationed at Khe Sanh in the mountainous regions of Quang Tri. The Marines drew from the same local Dega tribe, the Bru, as the Special Forces of nearby FOB 3, though the Special Forces, since they could offer a better rate of pay, usually got their pick of the tribe.)

The main difference between the Marine CAP and the Army programs was that the Marine program was a "hearts and minds" civic action program seeking to gain the trust and friendship of the Vietnamese they lived and worked with through a combination of military training and civic action projects, while the Special Forces Civilian Irregular Defense Group (CIDG) combined village defense units with mobile strike forces of mercenary light infantry. The original CIDG programs with Special Forces were sponsored by the Central Intelligence Agency, and were essentially a mercenary unit program. However, most of the CIDG units eventually became Army of the Republic of Vietnam (ARVN) Ranger units.

An additional combined operation involved MACV-SOG Military Assistance Command Vietnam Studies and Observations Group. (Studies and Observations Group was actually a code for Special Operations Group.) These were not local defense, but highly secret covert cross-border operations (aka "black ops"), in areas the US was not officially operating in at that point in the war, such as Laos, Cambodia, and North Vietnam. In many cases, both units formed a strong bond with their indigenous counterparts – a necessity for small units operating alone deep in enemy-held terrain.

Eventually, the regular Army also initiated a form of CAP – US Army Civil Action Patrol Team – similar to the Marine CAP on a smaller scale. However, they didn't live in the villages as the Marines did. Typically they were a 3-man team including an officer, enlisted instructor and radiotelephone operator. The HQ was in a nominally secure area, and they ventured out to arranged meeting places to provide instructional support in weapons maintenance, etc. One such element was an adjunct of the 1st/502d Inf, 101st Airborne Division and was sited at Eagle Beach in June 1970. (Information per former Army CAPT member, "M-60" Mike Kelley, in an E-mail to a CAP Marine. Unfortunately, the original E is no longer extant.)

== Effectiveness ==
"Of all our innovations in Vietnam none was as successful, as lasting in effect, or as useful for the future as the Combined Action Program [CAP]. "

Combined Action was at least in some areas a successful program in both military and civic action terms – perhaps one of the few successful programs of that war. Relatively cheap to operate, CAPs seldom used costly supporting arms fire, had a high "kill" ratio relative to the size of the unit. According to the late LtCol James H. Champion, USMC (Ret.); "In April and May 1969, 1st CAG killed 440 VC or NVA, and 1st CAG was killing more NVA than the entire 101st Airborne Division. 1st CAG had about 400 Marines and sailors at the time. Elsewhere in his article he states: "From 1966 until 30 June 1969 they {CAP NCOs} lead small units which killed over 4400 VC/ NVA."

They were often popular in the villages they worked in, and succeeded in denying them to the VC. "Of the 209 villages protected by CAP units, not one ever reverted to VC control. Of all the data compiled, subjective or objective, this one undeniable achievement remains as an example of success unparalleled in the war. Just by their presence CAP units were able to establish RVN primacy and served as one fact that VC propaganda could not explain away. CAP Marines are often fondly remembered and have been well received by their former villages when they re-visited Vietnam. Indeed, some have gone back there to work, doing much the same civic action that won their friendship originally.

Harold P. Ford, who held senior positions in both the National Intelligence Council and the Directorate of Operations, offers some insights on Secretary of Defense Robert McNamara's evaluation of the situation in Vietnam; "The large-unit operations war, which we know best how to fight and where we have had our successes, is largely irrelevant to pacification as long as we do not have it. Success in pacification depends on the interrelated functions of providing physical security, destroying the VC apparatus, motivating the people to cooperate and establishing responsive local government."

GEN William C. Westmoreland, commanding general, Military Assistance Command Vietnam was not an advocate of pacification programs. He believed in large unit land warfare, and was trying to stage a full-scale land battle with the NVA that would ostensibly break them for once and all. Nonetheless, he wrote in his memoirs that the Combined Action Program was one of the more "ingenious innovations developed in South Vietnam".

According to Peter Brush, "Civic action had promise. Had it been adopted on a wide scale the war would have been different, but it is a matter of speculation as to whether it would have ultimately affected the outcome."

Other writers including Maj Edward Palm, who was once a CAP Marine, thought otherwise. "I would like to believe, with some, that combined action was the best thing we did... ...In my experience, combined action was merely one more untenable article of faith. The truth, I suspect, is that where it seemed to work, combined action wasn't really needed, and where it was, combined action could never work."

== Notable former members ==
- Bing West, served in Combined Action Platoon Lima 1 in June 1966.

== See also ==
- Organization of the United States Marine Corps

== Notes ==
- Barry Goodson, CAP 1-2-4, CAP MOT, University of North Texas Press, 1997/

== Bibliography ==
Tom Flynn CAC Papa3 Marine. A Voice of Hope,184p.p. ISBN 1-56167-133-9, American Literary Press,1994. Also see copies found in Marine Corps Historical Center, Building 58, Washington Navy Yard,901 M Street, S.E., Washington, DC 20374 5040

- Russel H. Stolfi, U.S. Marine Corps Civic Action Efforts in Vietnam, March 1965 – March 1966, (Historical Branch, G-3 Division, Headquarters, U.S. Marine Corps, Washington, 1968)
- A series of six novels based on the CAP program, The Night Fighter Saga, was published during the late 1980s by David Sherman, a Marine participant of the program.
- Michael E. Peterson, "The Combined Action Platoons: The U.S. Marines' Other War in Vietnam," (M.A. Thesis. University of Oregon, 1988)
- The Village, Bing West, 1972
- Robert A. Klyman, "The Combined Action Program: An Alternative Not Taken," (Honors thesis, University of Michigan, 1986)
- Robert A. Klyman, "The Combined Action Platoons: The U.S. Marines' Other War in Vietnam" (Praeger Publishers, 1989), ISBN 0-275-93258-3
- Ray Stubbe and John Prados, "Valley of Decision," (Dell, NY, 1993)
- COL Bruce B. G. Clarke, "Expendable Warriors – The Battle of Khe Sanh and the Vietnam War" (Praeger International Security Westport, Connecticut & London, 2007)
- Gregg Jones, "Last Stand at Khe Sanh: The U.S. Marines' Finest Hour in Vietnam" (Da Capo Press 2014)
