= Hammer and Bolter =

Animated television series

- Genre: Action; Dark fantasy; Drama; Horror; Science fiction
- Created by: Games Workshop
- Based on: Warhammer 40,000 & Warhammer: Age of Sigmar
- Directed by: Dylan Shipley, Ryan Neal
- Country of origin: United Kingdom
- Original language: English
- No. of seasons: 1
- No. of episodes: 16

Production
- Animator: Farside Features
- Running time: 15-30 Minutes
- Production company: Games Workshop

Original release
- Network: Games Workshop
- Release: August 21, 2021 – January 22, 2025

Hammer and Bolter is an animated series based on the games Warhammer 40,000 and Warhammer: Age of Sigmar. 16 episodes were broadcast from August 2021 exclusively on Games Workshop's streaming website Warhammer+

== Plot ==
Hammer and Bolter is an anthology series, with the first 8 episodes directed by Dylan Shipley. Each 30 minute episode focused on one particular faction from Games Workshop's Warhammer 40,000 universe, such as the Imperial Guard, Chaos Space Marines, Orks, Necrons, or Tyranids. Some later episodes would switch to focus on factions from Games Workshop's Age of Sigmar game such as the Orruks, Cities of Sigmar, Slaves to Darkness, Witch Hunters, Skaven, Soulblight Vampires, or Stormcast Eternals.

== Episodes ==
Hammer and Bolter Season 1
Episode	Title	Notes
1	"Death's Hand"	An Imperial inquisitor tries to cheat fate and prevent his predicted assassination.
2	"Bound for Greatness"	A monk in the Imperial library is tempted by the Chaos God Tzeentch to read the forbidden books that he is required to count every day.
3	"Old Bale Eye"	A veteran Ork tells two younger warriors about his encounter with Imperial commisar Yarrick.
4	"Fangs"	Three new recruits to the Space Wolves prepare themselves for their rite of passage, while the elders place bets on which one will survive, passing to the next trials of becoming a Space Marine.
5	"A Question of Faith"	Two nuns from the Sisters of Battle defend the tomb of a long-dead saint from Khorne cultists.
6	"Garden of Ghosts"	An Eldar warlock scours the devastated remains of his childhood craftworld for the spirit stones of fallen warriors to animate combat drones.
7	"Kill Protocol"	A tech priest and her kastelan robot search for ancient archaeotech on a destroyed planet.
8	"Cadia Stands"	Imperial guardsmen defend a planet from tyranid invasion.
9	"Artefacts"	Black Legion Chaos space marines and Dark Eldar race to be the first to acquire a powerful Necron artefact.
10	"Plague Song"	Death Guard Chaos Space Marines plans to unleash a new pestilence upon the Imperium of Man.
11	"Double or Nothing"	The Orks threaten a sigmarite city.
12	"Monsters"	High in the peaks of Attramor, a horse-tribe of Darkoath warriors face a daily battle for survival. Jorvak Brand, the tribe's chieftain, has ambitions of a better future for his people, but their doom is only ever one night away.
13	"A New Life"	A family searches for safe passage off a besieged imperial hive city with their new baby. But not all is what it seems as the family's true colors are brought to light in a shocking twist.
14	"Undercity"	People are going missing on the streets of Hammerhal Aqsha. Can Witch Hunter Hanniver Toll and his reluctant colleague, the former Freeguild Captain, Armand Callis, work out what’s been going on? And just what will they discover in the sewers...
15	"Eternal"	When a captured Emperor's Children legionnaire is interrogated by the Exorcists Chapter, the vainglorious Lucius the Eternal sets out to silence him before he reveals the secrets of the 3rd Legion.
16	"Return to Cadia"	A squad of Cadian troopers in an Arvus Lighter make the journey to a sundered chunk of their ruined home planet.

== Reviews ==
Critics have generally responded favorably to the series due to the quality of the animation, the dialog, and its faithfulness to the source material. The episode "Old Bale Eye" received particularly high praise due to the presence of the fan-favorite character Commisar Yarrick.
