= StarFist series =

Novel series by David Sherman and Dan Cragg

StarFist is a series of military science fiction novels written by David Sherman and Dan Cragg. The novels are set in the 25th century and are written from the viewpoint of the men of the Confederation of Human Worlds Marine Corps 34th FIST (Fleet Initial Strike Team). An additional spin-off series, titled StarFist: Force Recon, by the same authors was started in 2005 with the publication of Backshot. All books were published by Del Rey Books.

== Authors ==
Dan Cragg was a non-commissioned officer in the United States Army, serving for twenty-two years with eleven years in overseas stations, five and half in Vietnam; at retirement Cragg was a sergeant major. He is also a writer of military non-fiction, including Inside the VC and NVA, and many others based around the Vietnam War. He lives in Virginia. Cragg published the first of the StarFist series with coauthor David Sherman.

David Sherman was a United States Marine veteran, whose military experience influenced his work from the start of his writing career. He served in the Marines for eight years, many of these in Vietnam. His experience in a Combined Action Platoon is particularly noticeable in his earlier works. After the war, he studied at the Pennsylvania Academy of the Fine Arts, and then became a sculptor, earning prizes for his work, before taking up writing.

== StarFist series ==
The Confederation of Human Worlds in the 21st century established its capital city at Fargo, North Dakota, which grew into a large metropolis with a multitude of skyscrapers and government buildings. The military headquarters of the Confederation in Fargo, North Dakota is called the Heptagon. A space navy, an army with air force capability transport space navy ships to whatever planet they are ordered to, and a Marine Corps make up the force. Humans have colonized numerous worlds out several hundred light years and are faced with conflicts involving surrounding extraterrestrials.

A short time after the authors submitted the manuscript of Double Jeopardy the series publisher, Del Rey, decided to cancel it.

== Novels ==
- First to Fight (1997)
- School of Fire (1998)
- Steel Gauntlet (1999)
- Blood Contact (1999)
- TechnoKill (2000)
- Hangfire (2000)
- Kingdom's Swords (2002)
- Kingdom's Fury (2003)
- Lazarus Rising (2003)
- A World of Hurt (2004)
- Flashfire (2006)
- Firestorm (2007)
- Wings of Hell (2008)
- Double Jeopardy (2009)

=== First to Fight ===
First to Fight
- First edition
- Cover artist: Jean Targete
- Language: English
- Publication date: October, 1997
- Publication place: United States
- Pages: 378
- ISBN: 978-0-345-40622-4
- OCLC: 37648602
- LC Class: 97091713
- Followed by: School of Fire

First to Fight was released in October 1997 and set in the 25th century as the first novel of the series. Don D'Amassa reviewed it for Science Fiction Chronicle. Russ Lockwood gave it a mixed review, claiming that the "writing flows well enough, neither sparkling nor dull, for a quick read. If you substitute jungle terrain for desert and M-16s for oxy-hydrogen plasma shooters, you could be with the authors on a patrol in Vietnam--and that's a pretty good feeling to hit".

==== Plot summary ====
The Confederation of Human Worlds comprises about two hundred semi-autonomous settled worlds. Some of those worlds are rich and powerful, others are not. The inter and intra-world disputes are settled by the powerful Confederation military; amongst them are the Confederation Marines, led by FISTs (Fleet Initial Strike Teams). Reports start to come from the desert world of Elneal of untold violence and hunger. A peacekeeping force composed of Marines from the 34th FIST (Fleet Initial Strike Team) is assembled. Amongst them is the young Private First Class Joseph F. Dean, a member of Third Platoon, Company L, whose journey through bootcamp and deployment is narrated.

As the Marines are deployed to isolated villages in Elneal, violence soon abates - one of Third Platoon's squads is given a new communicating device to field test, and dropped off some tens of kilometers away from the base. When the device malfunctions, the squad sees itself stranded in the desert, days of walking ahead of them, without armor. The Marines are constantly harassed by enemy forces and have to make multiple stands in order to fend off their assaults. The senior NCO with the squad, Staff Sergeant Bass, in desperation, makes a bold call - he challenges the enemy chieftain to a hand to hand duel, and wins. The enemy, awed, allow the Marines to return to a city unharassed.

==== Politics ====
First to Fight contains a veiled criticism of free and widespread gun ownership, which David Sherman considered to be a pathway to violence and possibly institutional collapse. Libertarian sci-fi writer L. Neil Smith's vision of an utopia where all citizens would be armed, in particular, was derided. Elneal, the planet where most of the book's plot takes place, was reportedly named after L. Neil Smith because of Sherman's belief that the conditions portrayed on Elneal (and the real-world country of Somalia, upon which the situation on Elneal was based) are the logical conclusion of unfettered civilian ownership of firearms.

=== School of Fire ===
School of Fire
- Cover artist: Jean Targete
- Language: English
- Publication date: 1998
- Publication place: United States
- Pages: 352
- ISBN: 0-345-40623-0
- OCLC: 39531660
- Preceded by: First to Fight
- Followed by: Steel Gauntlet

School of Fire is the second novel of the series. School of Fire received a positive review from Interzone, which praised the authors' experience. Russ Lockwood gave it a positive review, claiming that "the end result is a well-crafted story of small unit tactics set in a believable sci-fi future", and affirming that "Sherman and Cragg are to be congratulated on a job well done".

==== Plot summary ====
In this installment, the men of 34th FIST are deployed to help the rulers of Wanderjahr put down a rebellion that threatens the planet's political and economic stability. The Marines have two battles to fight — that they're aware of at least — one with the resourceful and well-led guerillas, and the other with the entrenched bureaucracy of the planetary police. But the 34th FIST gradually becomes aware that not all is what it seems. As the Marines are drawn deeper and deeper into the convoluted politics of Wanderjahr, they begin to suspect that the guerillas might not be the real enemy after all.

=== Steel Gauntlet ===
Steel Gauntlet
- Cover artist: Jean Targete
- Language: English
- Publication date: 1999
- Publication place: United States
- Pages: 352
- ISBN: 0-345-42526-X
- OCLC: 40624933
- Preceded by: School of Fire
- Followed by: Blood Contact

Steel Gauntlet is the third novel of the series. Author Colin Salt gave it a positive review, claiming it to be "a delightfully laughable tale", "helped by better fundamentals than the Starfist series sometimes has". Russ Lockwood also reviewed it positively, telling prospective readers that "you must roll with the punches and hang on for a wild ride into combat and derring-do. Don't read too much into the plot, or wonder why a genius like St. Cyr becomes increasingly inept. Instead, just read. You'll be glad you did.".

==== Plot summary ====
In Steel Gauntlet, St. Cyr, a maniacal sadist who has reinvented the doctrine of armored warfare, has taken control of the planet Diamunde, and 34th FIST is deployed as part of a larger force in a full-scale war to remove him from power. The Marines are to make an opposed landing, establish a "planethead" and hold for relief by the army. These Marines are going to have to fight tanks, something nobody has trained to do in several centuries. And beside the tactical and strategic problems presented by the armor, the overall commander of the Confederation force is a political admiral with a talent for making bad choices. The 34th FIST will have its hands full on this mission, and heavy casualties are certain.

=== Blood Contact ===
Blood Contact
- Cover artist: Jean Targete
- Language: English
- Publication date: 1999
- Publication place: United States
- Pages: 344
- ISBN: 0-345-42527-8
- OCLC: 43248280
- LC Class: CPB Box no. 1904 vol. 14
- Preceded by: Steel Gauntlet
- Followed by: TechnoKill

Blood Contact is the fourth novel of the series. Russ Lockwood gave it a mixed review, praising its writing and action while criticizing its overall plot and the enemies.

==== Plot summary ====
This book follows Gunnery Sergeant Bass and the rest of 3rd Platoon, Company L, 34th FIST as they investigate a missing scientific team on the uninhabited planet Society 437. Initially expecting that pirates are to blame for the failure of the team to check in as scheduled, 3rd Platoon discovers something far more deadly and dangerous is behind the destruction of the station. What they find has serious implications for the entire human race. The Skinks, a race of bipedal, amphibian-like creatures who wield acid guns, conduct a campaign to wipe out the entire Scientific Society.

=== TechnoKill ===
TechnoKill
- Cover artist: Jean Targete
- Language: English
- Publication date: 2000
- Publication place: United States
- Pages: 346
- ISBN: 0-345-43591-5
- OCLC: 44781526
- LC Class: CPB Box no. 1888 vol. 16
- Preceded by: Blood Contact
- Followed by: Hangfire

TechnoKill is the fifth novel of the series. Colin Salt gave it a negative review, claiming it to be "the low point of the Starfist series". Author Mary Welk reviewed it in 2003, remarking it "lacks the battle scenes one expects in a story of this kind". Russ Lockwood called it "another excellent book" in his review, however.

==== Plot summary ====
This book in the series once again follows 3rd Platoon, Company L, 34th FIST under Gunnery Sergeant Bass. This time they head to an alien planet kept in complete secrecy to hatch open a nefarious conspiracy of corruption at the highest levels of Confederation power.

=== Kingdom's Swords ===
Kingdom's Swords
- Cover artist: Mark Harrison
- Language: English
- Publication date: 2002
- Publication place: United States
- Pages: 368
- ISBN: 0-345-44371-3
- OCLC: 49666230
- Preceded by: Hangfire
- Followed by: Kingdom's Fury

Kingdom's Swords is the seventh novel of the Starfist Saga.

==== Plot summary ====
In the previous book, Hangfire, it was related that the Skinks (an alien race thus far mostly unknown to the Human Confederation) had invaded the planet Kingdom. The planetary government reluctantly requests Confederation assistance, but thanks to miscommunications and pure bureaucratic bungling, the Marines of 34th FIST are deployed thinking that they are on their way to put down a peasant rebellion. Kingdom's government are very religious and make it harder for the 34th FIST to fight the Skinks. Kingdom's army is too poorly equipped and trained to fight the Skinks. So the Skinks catch the 34th FIST by surprise. Only one platoon of the unit has encountered the Skinks before, in Blood Contact, and had been forbidden to talk about their experiences, or even reveal the existence of these aliens. Even worse than this surprise is a new devastating weapon in use by the Skinks, the Rail Gun, a weapon that makes it impractical for the Marines to use aircraft or armored vehicles. To make matters worse for Company L, their commander is unexpectedly summoned back to Earth.

=== Kingdom's Fury ===
Kingdom's Fury
- Cover artist: Mark Harrison
- Language: English
- Publication date: 2003
- Publication place: United States
- Pages: 338
- ISBN: 0-345-44372-1
- OCLC: 51490566
- Preceded by: Kingdom's Swords
- Followed by: Lazarus Rising

Kingdom's Fury is the eighth novel of the series, taking place largely on the planet called Kingdom, a world with a crazy-quilt religious theocracy involving various flavors of Christians, Muslims, and others. This book continues where Kingdom's Swords left off. Mary Welk gave it a positive review in 2003.

==== Plot summary ====
34th FIST has been reinforced by the 26th FIST, now that the Confederation is aware that this is a full scale Skink invasion. With the reinforcements, the Marines are now able to go off the defensive and take the battle to the Skinks. The Skinks have been using a devastating weapon never before seen by the Confederation armed forces, but in this book the Navy figures out what the weapon is, a Rail Gun. There doesn't appear to be a true defense, but at least there is now a warning when it is about to be used. The Marines launch a major operation where the Skinks have made a stronghold in the swamps on Kingdom. Meanwhile, Skink Battle Cruisers are on their way to Kingdom. Having been pushed back from their swamp on Kingdom the Skinks launch a diversion cover their retreat to the Skink fleet. Up to this point in the Starfist series there have been no portrayals of space Naval battles, but this omission is now rectified. The Marines and Confederation Navy drive the Skinks off world and push them back to the planet "Quagmire" where they used its natives as slaves and used the planet as a staging area to invade Kingdom. The Marines then go to Quagmire and kill most of the Skinks there, with the help of the natives.

Finally, an anti-skink task force is created, under the leadership of Marine General Aguinaldo. There is also a subplot involving the government of Kingdom, as one of the more powerful figures among the Kingdomites takes advantage of the distraction caused by the extensive combat to overthrow the theocracy and establish a fascist-style government.

== StarFist: Force Recon Series ==
StarFist: Force Recon describes the experiences of the men and women who carry out intelligence-gathering and small-unit raids behind enemy lines. The Confederation Marine Force Recon mission is very similar to that of United States Marine Corps Force Reconnaissance, with which co-author Sherman, a former US Marine, is familiar. The new series did not sell as well as the parent series, and the publisher allowed the series to end after three novels: Backshot, published in 2005; PointBlank, published in 2006; and Recoil, published in 2008.

=== Backshot ===
Backshot, the first book, was published in 2005. This story introduces the second platoon, Fourth Force Recon Marines, which are the unit that the series focuses on. The Marines are dispatched to the far-off agricultural world of Atlas, a member of the secretive Union of Margelan, itself a member-state of the Confederation of Human Worlds. The Margelan government is developing a secret technological project in Atlas; the Marines are ordered to discover what it is, and, if it is a weapon of mass destruction, to either destroy it or seize it for the Confederation. Once planetside, the Marines stumble upon many difficulties and intrigues on their way to the objective.

=== PointBlank ===
PointBlank is the second book in the series, published in 2006. The protagonists are once again second platoon, Fourth Force Recon Marines, and they are dispatched to Ravenette, a world which is waging a secessionist war with the Confederation. The Confederate forces on the planet are desperately fighting off a siege by the separatist forces, heavily outnumbered, and it is up to the Force Recon Marines to try to even the odds through black ops warfare - assassinations, demolitions and raids, in order to undermine the enemy's offensive capabilities. This book's events happen simultaneously to the main series novel Flashfire's.

=== Recoil ===
Recoil is the last book in the series, published in 2008. Second platoon is dispatched to the far-off world of Haulover, where local forces are fighting a losing battle against the skinks, an extraterrestrial enemy which for years has been violently raiding the frontiers of human space. Once again the Force Recon Marines are employed as force multipliers, using their special skill set in spectacularly bold ways. This book's events happen simultaneously to the main series novel Wings of Hell's.

== Critical reception ==
The novels were criticized for their all-male cast of soldiers, using contrived inter-service rivalries as a plot device, and a "tendency to telegraph their denouements". But as the Publishers Weekly review of STARFIST: Lazarus Rising stated, at the end "The politically correct may have trouble with the lack of female soldiers à la Honor Harrington, but the traditional male audience at which this is targeted will have no complaints.".

The books have been praised, however, for their verisimilitude with actual military experiences - being called "exciting", "hyperrealistic", and in a specific installment, "state-of-the-art military SF".

Regarding Force Recon, the writer Thomas Evans reviewed the first two volumes of the series, lauding Backshot's story, plot development and its differences from the main series of books; although he mentioned also liking PointBlank, he affirmed it "did not quite grab me as much as I had hoped".
