= David Wright O'Brien =

American poet

David Wright O'Brien (1918–1944) was an American fantasy and science fiction writer. A nephew of Farnsworth Wright, editor of Weird Tales, he was 22 years old when his first story ("Truth Is a Plague!") appeared in the February 1940 issue of Amazing Stories. Between January 1941 and August 1942, he had more than fifty-seven stories published in pulp magazines like Amazing Stories and Fantastic Adventures, most of them written under the pen names John York Cabot, Duncan Farnsworth, Clee Garson and Richard Vardon. Some of the stories were co-written with his close friend William P. McGivern, with whom O'Brien shared an office in Chicago. He continued writing even after he enlisted in the U.S. Army Air Force during World War II, adding "corporal" before all his pseudonyms. O'Brien died at age twenty-six, while flying a bombing raid over Berlin.

== Short stories ==
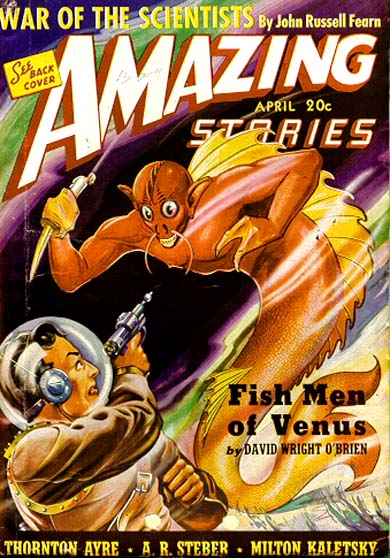
O'Brien's second published story, "Fish Men of Venus" was cover-featured on the April 1940 issue of Amazing Stories, illustrated by H. R. Hammond

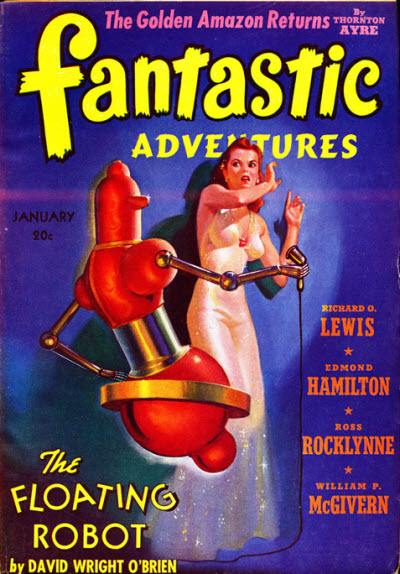
O'Brien's novella "The Floating Robot" was the cover story for the January 1941 issue of Fantastic Adventures, illustrated by Harold W. McCauley

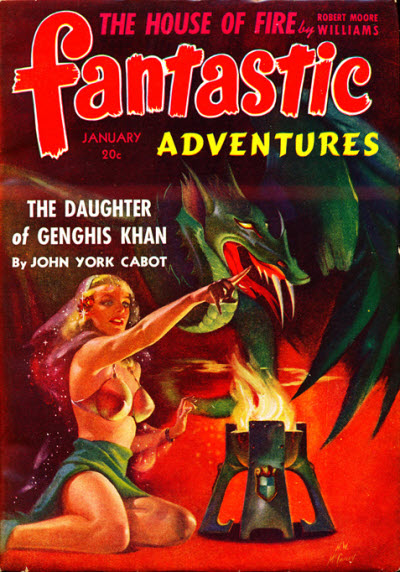
O'Brien's novella "The Daughter of Genghis Khan", published under his John York Cabot byline, was the cover story for the January 1942 issue of Fantastic Adventures, illustrated by Harold W. McCauley

- Truth Is a Plague! (Amazing Stories February 1940)
- Treasure Trove in Time (Amazing Stories November 1940)
- The Man the World Forgot (1940) [only as by John York Cabot]
- Fish Men of Venus (1940)
- John Brown's Body (Amazing Stories May 1940) with William P. McGivern
- Trapped on Titan (Amazing Stories June 1940)
- Suicide Squadrons of Space (Amazing Stories August 1940)
- The Strange Voyage of Hector Squinch (1940)
- The Genius of Mr. Pry (1941) [only as by Duncan Farnsworth]
- The Truthful Liar (1941) [only as by John York Cabot]
- The Goddess of Love (1941) [only as by Duncan Farnsworth]
- Miracle at Dunkirk (1941) [only as by John York Cabot]
- Problem on Mars (1941) [only as by Duncan Farnsworth]
- Three Terrible People (1941) [only as by John York Cabot]
- Bill of Rights, 5000 A.D. (1941) [only as by John York Cabot]
- The Man Who Murdered Himself (1941) [only as by Duncan Farnsworth]
- Twenty-Fifth Century Sherlock (1941) [only as by Duncan Farnsworth]
- The Thought Robot (1941) [only as by John York Cabot]
- The Floating Robot (1941)
- Skidmore's Strange Experiment (1941)
- Hammer of the Gods (1941) [only as by John York Cabot]
- The Last Analysis (1941) [only as by John York Cabot]
- Murder in the Past (1941) [only as by John York Cabot]
- The Man Who Lived Next Week (1941)
- Beyond the Time Door (1941)
- The Man Who Forgot (1941) [only as by John York Cabot]
- Return of the Space Hawk (1941) [only as by Duncan Farnsworth]
- Secret of the Lost Planet (1941)
- Pepper Pot Planet (1941) [only as by Duncan Farnsworth]
- 10 Seconds from Nowhere (1941)
- The Man Who Got Everything (1941) [only as by John York Cabot]
- Mr. Muddle Does as He Pleases (1941) with William P. McGivern
- Ferdinand Finknodle's Perfect Day (1941)
- Mystery of the Mummy (1941) [only as by Duncan Farnsworth]
- Sergeant Shane of the Space Marines (1941) [only as by John York Cabot]
- Nicolbee's Nightmare (1941) [only as by John York Cabot]
- The Odds on Sergeant Shane (1941) [only as by John York Cabot]
- Rayhouse in Space (1941) [only as by Duncan Farnsworth]
- The Beauty and the Beasties (1941)
- The Legend of Mark Shayne (1942) [only as by John York Cabot]
- Daughter of the Snake God (1942) with William P. McGivern [only as by William P. McGivern and John York Cabot]
- Talu's Fan (1942) [only as by John York Cabot]
- The Daughter of Genghis Khan (1942) [only as by John York Cabot]
- V is for Vengeance (1942) [only as by Duncan Farnsworth]
- The Outsiders (1942) [only as by Duncan Farnsworth]
- The Tenant on the 13th Floor (1942) [only as by John York Cabot]
- Marlow's Malicious Mirror (1942) [only as by John York Cabot]
- Madagascar Ghost (1942) [only as by Clee Garson]
- The Incredible Antique (1942) [only as by Bruce Dennis]
- Sharbeau's Startling Statue (1942) [only as by Clee Garson]
- That Dreadful Night (1942) [only as by John York Cabot]
- Mr. Hibbard's Magic Hat (1942) [only as by John York Cabot]
- Cupid Takes a Holiday (1942) [only as by Duncan Farnsworth]
- The Giant from Jupiter (1942) with William P. McGivern [only as by Gerald Vance and Bruce Dennis]
- Afraid to Live (1942) [only as by Duncan Farnsworth]
- The Fantastic Twins (1942) [only as by John York Cabot]
- Spook for Yourself (1942)
- Q Ship of Space (1942) [only as by Duncan Farnsworth]
- The Man Who Changed History (1942) [only as by John York Cabot]
- Suicide Ship to Earth (1942) [only as by Duncan Farnsworth]
- The Living Manikins (1942)
- Lord of the Crystal Bow (1942) [only as by Duncan Farnsworth]
- Twenty-Four Terrible Hours (1942) [only as by John York Cabot]
- Return of Joan of Arc (1942)
- Sergeant Shane Goes to War (1942) [only as by John York Cabot]
- The Incredible Mr. Kismet (1942)
- Blitzkrieg in the Past (1942) [only as by John York Cabot]
- Squadron of the Damned (1942)
- Hokum Hotel (1942)
- The Case of Jonathan Lane (1942) [only as by John York Cabot]
- Creegar Dares to Die (1942)
- Resurrection from Hell (1942)
- Flight from Farisha (1942) [only as by Duncan Farnsworth]
- Pegasus Plays Priorities (1942)
- Rats in the Belfry (1943) [only as by John York Cabot]
- The Money Machine (1943) [only as by Clee Garson]
- Direct Wire (1943) [only as by Clee Garson]
- Have You Seen Me? (1943) [only as by Richard Vardon]
- The Last Case of Jules de Granjerque (1943) [only as by John York Cabot]
- The Merchant of Venus (1943) [only as by Clee Garson]
- Where in the Warehouse? (1943) [only as by Bruce Dennis]
- Trail of the Magic Slippers (1943) [only as by John York Cabot]
- The Other Abner Small (1943) [only as by Clee Garson]
- Club of the Damned (1943) [only as by Clee Garson]
- The Great Train Robbery (1943) [only as by John York Cabot]
- Saunders' Strange Second Sight (1943) [only as by Clee Garson]
- Mister Trouble (1943)
- Yesterday's Clock (1943)
- Victory from the Void (1943) with William P. McGivern
- Bring Back My Body (1943)
- Periscope Prey (1943)
- Furlough from Eternity (1943)
- The Curious Coat (1943)
- Stenton's Shadow (1943)
- The Devil's Planet (1943)
- I'll See You Again (1944) [only as by Duncan Farnsworth]
- Matches and Kings (1944) [only as by John York Cabot]
- Time on Your Hands (1944) [only as by John York Cabot]
- The Place Is Familiar (1944)
- Private Prune Speaking (1944)
- Mister Anonymous (1945)
- A Room with a View (1946)
- Christopher Crissom's Cravat (1946)
- The Softly Silken Wallet (1946)
- Painting of the Prophet (1947)
- The Spoilers of Lern (1951) [only as by Clee Garson]
- Let's Give Away Mars! (1951) [only as by Clee Garson]
- The Martian Cross (1952) [only as by Clee Garson]

== Poems ==
- Introduction to a Stranger (1939)

== Essays ==
- Meet the Authors: David Wright O'Brien (1940)
- It's a Wonderful World! (1941) [only as by John York Cabot]
- Progress Is a Headache (1941) [only as by John York Cabot]
