= Dan Cragg =

American science-fiction author

- Born: September 6, 1939 (age 86); Rochester, New York, U.S.
- Occupations: Soldier, author
- Writing career
- Genre: Science fiction

Dan Cragg (born September 6, 1939) is an American science fiction author.

== Biography ==
Cragg was born in Rochester, New York. He served in the United States Army from 1958 to 1980, retiring with the rank of sergeant major. He served two tours of duty in Vietnam, 1962–63 and 1965–69 as well as tours of duty in Germany, Italy, and South Korea. From 1985 to 2003, worked in the Office of the Secretary of Defense, Washington, DC as a management analyst; member, Fairfax County History Commission, 1997–2003; auxiliary police officer, Fairfax County PD, 1996–2002.

During his tour of duty in the US Army Cragg received, among other awards, the Vietnam Armed Forces Honor Medal and the Vietnam Service Medal, with eleven campaign stars.

== Writing career ==
Cragg writes both military-related fiction and non-fiction.

=== Non-fiction ===
- The NCO Guide (1982)
- A Travel Guide to Military Installations (1983, 2nd edition published as A Guide to Military Installations, 1988)
- A Dictionary of Soldier Talk (1984, with John Elting and Ernest Deal)
- Inside the VC and NVA: The Real Story of North Vietnam's Armed Forces (1992, with Michael Lee Lanning).
- Top Sergeant: The Life and Times of Sergeant Major of the Army William G. Bainbridge (1995, with William G. Bainbridge).
- Generals in Muddy Boots: A Concise Encyclopedia of Combat Commanders (1996, with Walter J. Boyne).

==== As editor ====
- Francis Grose, The Mirror's File: Advice to the Officers of the British Army, with a Biographical Sketch of the Life and a Bibliography of the Works of Captain Francis Grose, F.S.A. (1978, also wrote introduction).
- Guardians of the Republic (A History of the non-commissioned officer corps of the U.S. Army) (1992)
- Operation Thirty-Four Alpha (history of U.S.-controlled commando operations in North Vietnam, 1992)

=== Fiction ===
- The Soldier's Prize (novel, 1986)

=== Science fiction ===
==== The StarFist Saga (with David Sherman) ====
- First to Fight (1997)
- School of Fire (1998)
- Steel Gauntlet (1999)
- Blood Contact (1999)
- TechnoKill (2000)
- Hangfire (2000)
- Kingdom's Swords (2002)
- Kingdom's Fury (2003)
- Lazarus Rising (2003)
- A World of Hurt (2004)
- Flashfire (2006)
- Firestorm (2007)
- Wings of Hell (2008)
- Double Jeopardy (2009)

==== The StarFist: Force Recon Saga (with David Sherman) ====
- Backshot (2005)
- PointBlank 2006
- Recoil 2008

==== Novels not part of a series ====
- Jedi Trial (with David Sherman) (2004)
