= Michael Poore =

American novelist

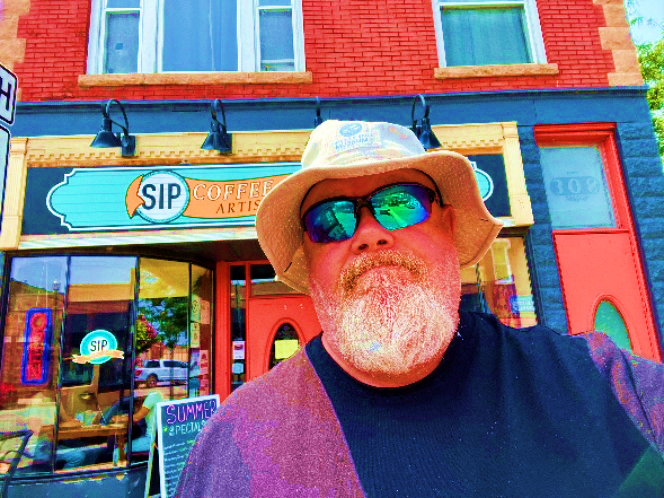
Michael Poore

Michael Poore (born 1967 in Dayton, Ohio) is an American novelist, the author of three novels: Up Jumps the Devil (2012), Reincarnation Blues (2017) andTwo Girls, a Clock, and a Crooked House (2019). His short fiction has appeared in Glimmer Train, Southern Review, Agni, Fiction, and Asimov’s. Poore lives in Highland, Indiana, with his wife, poet and activist Janine Harrison, and their daughter, Jianna.

== List of works ==
Novels

- Up Jumps the Devil (2012)
- Reincarnation Blues (2017)
- Two Girls, a Clock, and a Crooked House (2019)

Short stories

Title	Publication	Notes
Blue Earth	Carolina Quarterly (Spring 2000)	as Arlo Ramirez
The Fall of Enrico Montoya	Baltimore Review (Winter 2000)	reprinted in Red Wheelbarrow (Spring 2001)
The Whale in the Moon	Haydens Ferry Review 29 (Fall/Winter 2001-2002)	reprinted in Second Writes inaugural issue
Romances	Black Warrior Web (Winter 2002)	
Six Chinese Cooks Rose into the Air	The Southern Review (Summer 2003)	
Chief Next Lightning's Phantom Hand	StoryQuarterly 39 (2004)	
The Wooden Mother	Talebones 30 (Summer 2005)	Honorable Mention: Year's Best Fantasy and Horror 2006
The Wind in His Cotton Mountain Paradise	The Greensboro Review (Fall 2005)	
History of the Ghosts of Judy, Tennessee	StoryQuarterly 41 (2005)	honorable mention: 2006 SLF Fountain Award — for speculative fiction short story
The Fires of Krypton	Fiction 54 (2008)	
How to Raise a Positive-Thinking Baby	Fiction (2008)	
Three Fables About Entropy	Pacific Review (2008)	
Crazy Horse in Retirement	The MacGuffin (2008)	
Bury Me Under the Drugstore, Mama	Northwest Review Vol. 46, Issue 2 (May 2008)	
The Paint Giant	North Dakota Quarterly (Winter 2008)	
Blood Dauber	Asimov’s Science Fiction (October/November 2009)	written with Nebula Award nominee Ted Kosmatka reprinted in The Year's Best Science Fiction: Twenty-Seventh Annual Collection
The Beekeeper	Glimmer Train Stories 74 (2010)	
The Street of the House of the sun	The Pinch (2011)	reprinted in The Best American Nonrequired Reading 2012
The Rain That Time/That Thing That Happened	AGNI 81 (2015)	
The Fool Killer	New Limestone Review (2017)	Read online
What The Fire God Said To The Beast	My Name Was Never Frankenstein: And Other Classic Adventure Tales Remixed (2019)	Michael described it as "an excerpted chapter from the 'Moby Dick' prequel / Captain Ahab book I'm working on."

Essays

Title	Publication	Notes
The Story of Writing a Story	Glimmer Train (2012?)	Read online
If You Build It, They Will Come: Letting Agents Come to You	Writer's Digest (10/2/2013)	Read online
