= William G. Bainbridge =

Fifth Sergeant Major of the United States Army

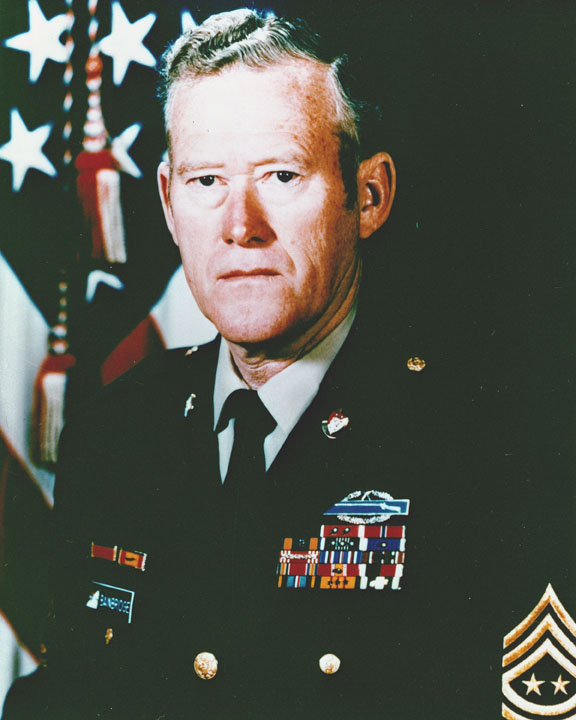
- Sergeant Major of the Army William G. Bainbridge
- Born: April 17, 1925; Galesburg, Illinois, U.S.
- Died: November 29, 2008 (aged 83); Florida, U.S.
- Burial place: Arlington National Cemetery
- Military career
- Allegiance: United States
- Branch: United States Army
- Service years: 1943–1945; 1951–1979
- Rank: Sergeant Major of the Army
- Nickname: Top
- Conflicts: World War II; Vietnam War
- Awards: Army Distinguished Service Medal; Legion of Merit (3); Bronze Star Medal; Air Medal (2); Army Commendation Medal (4); Purple Heart (2)

William G. Bainbridge (April 17, 1925 – November 29, 2008) was a United States Army soldier who served as the fifth Sergeant Major of the Army. He was sworn in on 1 July 1975, and served until June 1979. He was the last World War II veteran to hold the position of Sergeant Major of the Army (SMA).

== Early life ==
Bainbridge was born in Galesburg, Illinois, on 17 April 1925.

== Military career ==
Bainbridge volunteered for the draft into the United States Army in June 1943 from Williamsfield, Illinois. He was inducted at Camp Grant, Illinois and then directly sent to training at Camp Wallace, Texas where he was trained as an antiaircraft artilleryman. He would volunteer for flight training at Sheppard Field, Texas. He learned how to fly in North Dakota and was then sent to Santa Ana Army Air Base in California in February 1944 where he was told there were not enough planes for the number of cadets. He was reassigned to Lowery Field in Colorado for gunnery training. He was finally assigned to the 106th Infantry Division.

His first unit of assignment was with the 423d Infantry Regiment of the 106th Infantry Division, the last army division organized for service in World War II. He was quickly promoted to sergeant as a squad leader. After deploying into the Ardennes region of Belgium in late 1944, Bainbridge's regiment was overrun by German forces during the Battle of the Bulge. He was captured and spent the remaining months of the war in a Stalag 9A near Giessen before being liberated by the 6th Armored Division.

Upon returning to the United States, Bainbridge left active duty and joined the Army Reserve. He was recalled to active duty in January 1951 as a staff sergeant. Following assignments at Camp Atterbury, Indiana, Fort Sheridan, Illinois, Fort Riley, and Fort Leonard Wood, he was reassigned to Europe and served as the Operations Sergeant with Headquarters, VII Corps. By 1958 he reenlisted in the regular army as a sergeant first class. He was stationed at Fort Leonard Wood until 1959 when he was sent to Stuttgart, Germany, where he was the acting Sergeant Major. In 1962 he returned to Fort Riley, Kansas, where he served with the 1st Infantry Division as sergeant major of the 1st Battle Group, 28th Infantry, later reorganized as the 1st Battalion, 28th Infantry. In 1965 he accompanied the battalion to South Vietnam. Midway through his tour in Vietnam, Bainbridge was appointed command sergeant major of the II Field Force.

From September 1966 through August 1967, Bainbridge was command sergeant major of the United States Army Infantry Training Center, Fort Benning, Georgia. He then was appointed the command sergeant major of the First United States Army at Fort George G. Meade, Maryland and later selected to serve as command sergeant major of the United States Army, Pacific located in Fort Shafter, Hawaii. In October 1972, Bainbridge became the first command sergeant major of the newly created United States Army Sergeants Major Academy at Fort Bliss, Texas and remained there until his appointment as Sergeant Major of the Army (SMA) on 1 July 1975.

While he was SMA, Chief of Staff General Frederick C. Weyand extended the term of the SMA from two to three years under General Orders No. 14, dated 16 June 1976. During his tenure the Secretary of the Army had made the SMA a member of the Army Policy Council, and the Army Chief of Staff had made him a member of the Army Staff Council as well as the General Staff Council. He retired 18 June 1979.

== Later life ==
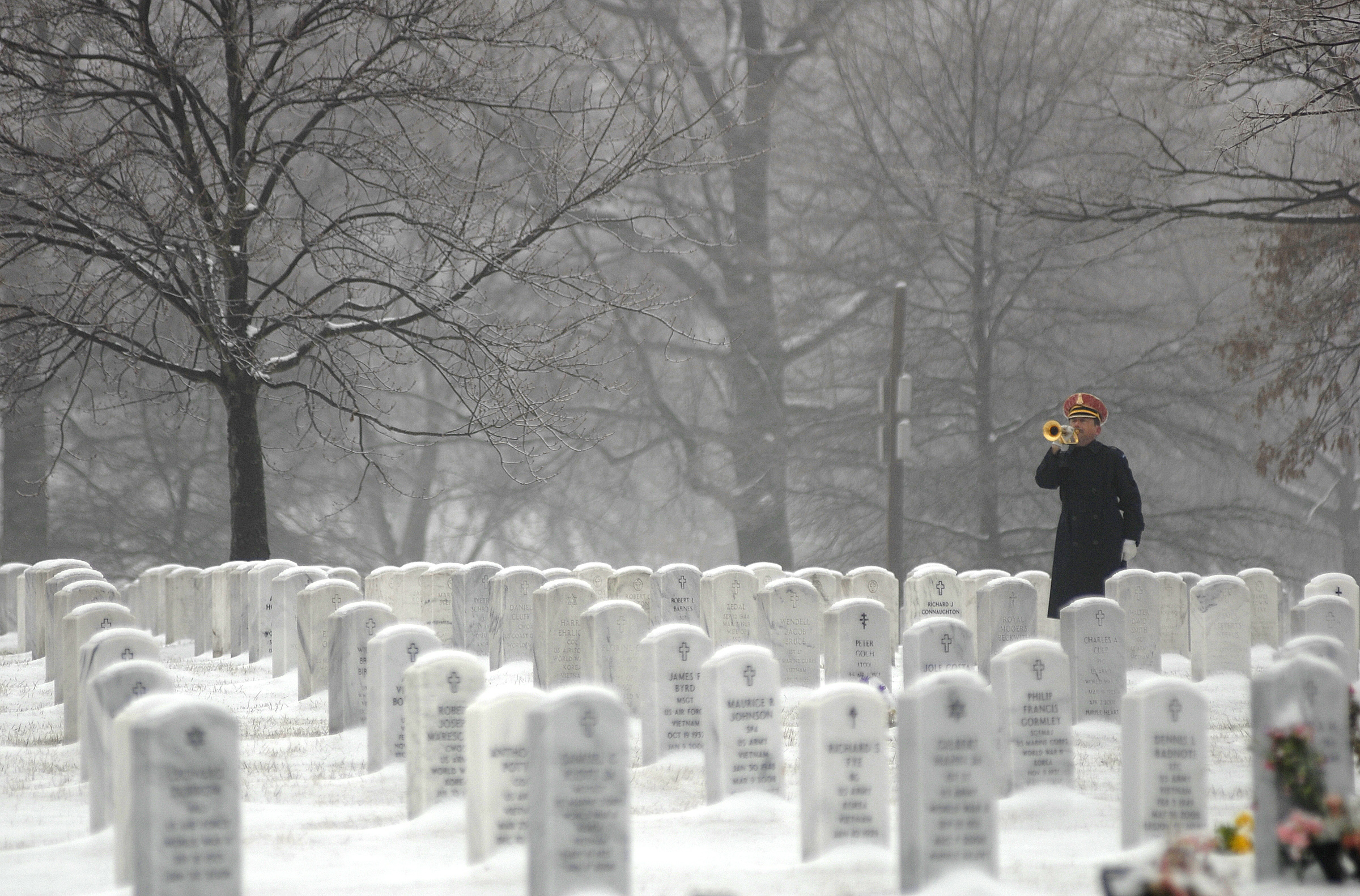
A bugler from the U.S. Army Band plays taps at the burial service for William G. Bainbridge at Arlington National Cemetery (January 28, 2009)

In July 1991, Bainbridge retired to Palm Bay, Florida. He died there on November 29, 2008, and was buried in Arlington National Cemetery.

== Awards and decorations ==
Combat Infantry Badge, 2 awards

Army Distinguished Service Medal
Legion of Merit with two oak leaf clusters
Bronze Star
Air Medal with award numeral 2
Army Commendation Medal with three oak leaf clusters
Purple Heart with oak leaf cluster
Meritorious Unit Commendation
Prisoner of War Medal
Army Good Conduct Medal (9 awards)
American Campaign Medal
European-African-Middle Eastern Campaign Medal with three service stars
World War II Victory Medal
Army of Occupation Medal
National Defense Service Medal with oak leaf cluster
Armed Forces Expeditionary Medal
Vietnam Service Medal with three service stars
Republic of Vietnam Gallantry Cross Unit Citation
Republic of Vietnam Campaign Medal

- 9 Service stripes.

Military offices
Preceded by Leon L. Van Autreve	Sergeant Major of the Army; 1975–1979	Succeeded by William A. Connelly
