= David Sherman (novelist) =

American war novelist and veteran Marine

- Born: February 27, 1944; Niles, Ohio, U.S.
- Died: November 16, 2022 (aged 78)
- Education: Pennsylvania Academy of the Fine Arts
- Occupation: Novelist

David Sherman (February 27, 1944 – November 16, 2022) was an American novelist who dealt overwhelmingly with military themes at the small-unit tactical level. His experiences as a United States Marine informed his writings.

== Early life and education ==
Sherman was born in Niles, Ohio in 1944. He grew up in Kansas, Texas, New Jersey and Omaha, Nebraska, from where he joined the United States Marine Corps soon after turning 18. After his departure from the U.S. Marine Corps, he moved to Philadelphia where he studied at the Pennsylvania Academy of the Fine Arts. He had a brief stint as a sculptor, winning awards for his work.

== Military career ==
David Sherman enlisted in the US Marine Corps directly out of high school. He went through Boot Camp at Marine Corps Recruit Depot, San Diego, California and Infantry Training Regiment at Camp San Onofre, a part of Marine Corps Base Camp Pendleton, California. He was promoted to Private First Class (PFC) prior to reporting to his first duty station, the First Marine Brigade at Marine Corps Air Station, Kaneohe Bay, Oahu, Hawaii where he was assigned to third platoon, Lima Company, Third Battalion, Fourth Marines. While there he was promoted to Lance Corporal and rose from basic rifleman to fire team leader. Following that tour in the peace time infantry, he served as a military policeman at Marine Corps Air Station Cherry Point, North Carolina. He was released from active duty and honorably discharged upon completion of his six years combined active and reserve service. He holds the Combat Action Ribbon, several unit citations, both US and Vietnamese, the Good Conduct Medal, and service and campaign medals.

== Writing career ==
Sherman began writing in 1983. His first book, Knives in the Night, was published in 1987 by the Ivy Book imprint of Ballantine Books as the first novel in Sherman's series, The Night Fighter. The series consists of six books, also including Main Force Assault (1987), Out of the Fire (1987), A Rock and a Hard Place (1988), A Nghu Night Falls (1988), and Charlie Don't Live Here Anymore (1989). In 1989, Sherman published There I Was: The War of Corporal Henry J Morris, USMC under Ivy Book.

Del Rey Books published Sherman's DemonTech series, which includes Onslaught (2002), Rally Point (2003), and Gulf Run (2004).

Altogether, as of June 2007, Sherman had published 26 novels, including 15 with his co-author, Dan Cragg.

=== Overview ===
Sherman said this of himself:

I began my writing career writing novels about US Marines fighting the war in Vietnam (I was one and I did). Today I'm writing novels about Marines fighting wars centuries in the future and in a world that never existed. Seems I've been typecast.

On October 24, 2008, Sherman was interviewed for Armed Forces Network (a network and website for US military personnel in Europe), and the interview was posted on their website. In the interview, he discusses Starfist, how the series came to be, and mentions that a motion picture screenplay of the first book, First to Fight, was being shopped around Hollywood. The screenplay was not written by either Sherman or his co-author Dan Cragg, but by Eric Bean, a screenwriter and a die hard fan of the Starfist series.

=== Literary themes ===
Sherman's fiction mostly dealt with military themes, in particular, those involving Marine enlisted men.

== Bibliography ==
=== Vietnam War ===
==== The Night Fighters ====
- Knives in the Night; Ivy Books, 1987.
- Main Force Assault; Ivy Books, 1987. ISBN 0804101035
- Out of the Fire; Ivy Books, 1987.
- A Rock and a Hard Place; Ivy Books, 1988.
- A Nghu Night Falls; Ivy Books, 1988. ISBN 0804102678 OCLC 18775090
- Charlie Don't Live Here Anymore; Ivy Books, 1989. ISBN 0804103135 OCLC 19378066

==== Novels not part of a series ====
- There I Was: The War of Corporal Henry J Morris, USMC (Ivy Book imprint of Ballantine Books, 1989) ISBN 0804104980
- The Squad (1990)
- The Junkyard Dogs

=== Science fiction ===
==== The StarFist series (with Dan Cragg) ====
- First to Fight, (Ballantine Books, 1997) ISBN 0345406222 OCLC 37648602
- School of Fire, (1998) ISBN 0345406230 OCLC 39531660
- Steel Gauntlet, (1999) Reissued by Del Rey, 2013. ISBN 9780345453587 OCLC 869403298
- Blood Contact, (1999)
- TechnoKill, (2000)
- Hangfire, (2000)
- Kingdom's Swords, (2002)
- Kingdom's Fury, (2003)
- Lazarus Rising, (Del Rey, 2003) ISBN 978-0-345-46000-4
- A World of Hurt, (Ballantine, 2004) ISBN 0345460537 OCLC 62598355
- Flashfire, (2006)
- Firestorm, (Del Rey, 2007 hardcover, 2008 paperback) ISBN 9780345460578 OCLC 178278251
- Wings of Hell, (2008)
- Double Jeopardy, (2009)

==== The StarFist: Force Recon Saga (with Dan Cragg) ====
- Backshot, (Ballantine Books, 2005) ISBN 0345460588 OCLC 61122022
- PointBlank, 2006
- Recoil, 2008

==== The DemonTech Saga ====
Books published by Del Rey Books

1. Onslaught (2002)
2. Rally Point (2003)
3. Gulf Run (2004)

Books published by DTF Publications (a division of Dark Quest Books )

- Get Her Back! (2011) (novella)
- "Surrender and Die" (short story) appearing in So It Begins , edited by Mike McPhail
- "Delaying Action" (short story) appearing in By Other Means , edited by Mike McPhail

In reference to the novella and short stories, David Sherman says on his web site:

Those three stories amount to the first 35% or 40% of DemonTech book 4. My current thinking is that I will write two more novellas and a couple of short stories, all to be published by Dark Quest Books under their DTF Publications imprint (the same as Get Her Back!). Then I will combine them with some connecting material, and voila, book 4!

==== Novels not part of a series ====
- Jedi Trial (with Dan Cragg) (2004)
- The Hunt
