= Jean Pierre Targete =

Jean Pierre Targete is a fantasy and science fiction artist.

== Career ==
He created the cover art for many of the Avon paperback editions of The Chronicles of Amber and for the Second Foundation Trilogy.

Targete illustrated the cards Claw-Hide, Doppel Shock, and Myzary for the 1995 Fleer Ultra Spider-Man set.

== Personal life ==
He was born in New York City and raised in Miami, Florida. He currently works and lives in Winnetka, California.
