= Del Rey Books =

Publisher

- Former logo
- Type: Subsidiary
- Industry: Books, publishing
- Founded: 1977; 49 years ago
- Founders: Judy-Lynn del Rey and Lester del Rey
- Headquarters: 1745 Broadway, New York City, Random House Tower
- Key people: Judy-Lynn del Rey; Lester del Rey; Tricia Narwani (editor-in-chief since 2013)
- Products: Books
- Parent: Random House
- Website: randomhousebooks.com/imprint/del-rey/

Del Rey Books is an imprint of the Random House Group, a division of Penguin Random House. The imprint was established in 1977 under the editorship of Judy-Lynn del Rey and her husband, author Lester del Rey. Today, the imprint specializes in science fiction, fantasy, horror, and fantasy romance.

The first new novel published by Del Rey was The Sword of Shannara by Terry Brooks in 1977. Del Rey formerly published Star Wars novels under the Lucasbooks sub-imprint (licensed from Lucasfilm, a subsidiary of The Walt Disney Studios division of The Walt Disney Company) that are now published by its sister imprint, Random House Worlds.

== Authors ==
- Piers Anthony
- Isaac Asimov
- Stephen Baxter
- Amber Benson
- Ray Bradbury
- Max Brooks
- Terry Brooks
- Pierce Brown
- John Brunner
- Bonnie Burton
- Jack L. Chalker
- Cassandra Clare
- Arthur C. Clarke
- James Clemens
- Dan Cragg
- Brian Daley
- Maurice G. Dantec
- Philip K. Dick
- Stephen R. Donaldson
- David Eddings
- Philip José Farmer
- Mick Farren
- Joe Clifford Faust
- Heather Fawcett
- Lynn Flewelling
- Robert L. Forward
- Alan Dean Foster
- Gregory Frost
- Christopher Golden
- James L. Halperin
- Barbara Hambly
- Peter F. Hamilton
- Ward Hawkins
- Kevin Hearne
- Robert A. Heinlein
- Robert E. Howard
- Robert Don Hughes
- Danielle L. Jensen
- J. Gregory Keyes
- Rosemary Kirstein
- Katherine Kurtz
- H. P. Lovecraft
- James Luceno
- Anne McCaffrey
- Donald E. McQuinn
- China Miéville
- Terry Miles
- Elizabeth Moon
- Sylvain Neuvel
- Robert Newcomb
- Larry Niven
- John Norman
- Naomi Novik
- Frederik Pohl
- Michael Poore
- Christopher Rowley
- David Sherman
- Scott Sigler
- Lucy A. Snyder
- Michael J. Sullivan
- J. R. R. Tolkien
- Harry Turtledove
- Lawrence Watt-Evans

== Books published ==
2025

- Water Moon (January 2025) by Samantha Sotto Yambao
- At the Bottom of the Garden (January 2025) by Camilla Bruce
- Emily Wilde's Compendium of Lost Tales (February 2025) by Heather Fawcett
- Cursebound (February 2025) by Saara El-Arifi
- The Ragpicker King (March 2025) by Cassandra Clare
- The Seventh Veil of Salome (May 2025) by Silvia Moreno-Garcia
- Lady Macbeth (May 2025) by Ava Reid
- The Ending Fire (May 2025) by Saara El-Arifi
- Silver Elite (May 2025) by Dani Francis
- A Curse Carved in Bone (May 2025) by Danielle L. Jensen
- Lucy Undying: A Dracula Novel (June 2025) by Kiersten White
- A Dance of Lies (June 2025) by Brittney Arena
- Buried Deep and Other Stories (June 2025) by Naomi Novik
- Candle & Crow (July 2025) by Kevin Hearne
- Arcana Academy (July 2025) by Elise Kova
- The Bewitching (July 2025) by Silvia Moreno-Garcia
- Alchemised (September 2025) by SenLinYu

2024

- The Tainted Cup (February 2024) by Robert Jackson Bennett
- The Warm Hands of Ghosts (February 2024) by Katherine Arden
- A Fate Inked In Blood (February 2024) by Danielle L. Jensen
- Those Beyond the Wall (March 2024) by Micaiah Johnson
- Incidents Around the House (June 2024) by Josh Malerman
- The Book of Elsewhere (July 2024) by Keanu Reeves and China Miéville
- The Crimson Crown (August 2024) by Heather Walter
- Blood Over Bright Haven (October 2024) by M. L. Wang
- We Shall Be Monsters (November 2024) by Alyssa Wees
- The Traitor Queen (November 2024) by Danielle L. Jensen

=== 2023 ===
- The Endless War (November 2023) by Danielle L. Jensen

=== 2022 ===
- The Inadequate Heir (May 2022) by Danielle L. Jensen

2020

- A Blight of Blackwings (February 2020) by Kevin Hearne
- Devolution (June 2020) by Max Brooks
- Mexican Gothic (June 2020) by Silvia Moreno-Garcia
- Ink & Sigil (August 2020) by Kevin Hearne

=== Series ===
Batman
A trilogy based on the Dark Knight version of the character.

1. Batman: Dead White (2006 novel) by John Shirley
2. Batman: Inferno (2006 novel) by Alex Irvine
3. Batman: Fear Itself (2007 novel) by Michael Reaves and Steven-Elliot Altman

Dragonriders of Pern
Twenty-three Dragonriders of Pern novels by Anne McCaffrey and Todd McCaffrey beginning with the first edition of the third novel—The White Dragon (1978)—and reprints of the first two novels.

Ghosts of Albion
Accursed (2005 novel) by Amber Benson and Christopher Golden
Witchery (2006 novel) by Amber Benson and Christopher Golden

God of War

1. God of War (2010 novelization) by Matthew Stover and Robert E. Vardeman
2. God of War II (2013 novelization) by Robert E. Vardeman

Halo

1. Halo: The Fall of Reach (2001 novel) by Eric Nylund
2. Halo: The Flood (2003 novel) by William C. Dietz
3. Halo: First Strike (2003 novel) by Eric Nylund

Ink & Sigil by Kevin Hearne

1. Ink & Sigil (2020 novel)
2. Paper & Blood (2021 novel)

Rabbits by Terry Miles

1. Rabbits (June 2021 novel
2. The Quiet Room (October 2023 novel)

Robotech
Twenty-one Robotech novels (1987–1996) by James Luceno and Brian Daley

Shannara
Eleven (and counting) Shannara novels by Terry Brooks

Spider-Man by Peter David

1. Spider-Man (2002 novelization) by Peter David
2. Spider-Man 2 (2004 novelization) by Peter David

StarFist
Fourteen StarFist novels (1997–2009) and three StarFist: Force Recon novels (2005-2008) by David Sherman and Dan Cragg

Southern Victory
Eleven Southern Victory novels (1997–2007) by Harry Turtledove

Star Wars
Many Star Wars novels by various authors.

Tarzan
Time's Last Gift (1977 revised edition) by Philip José Farmer
Tarzan: The Epic Adventures (1996) by R. A. Salvatore
The Dark Heart of Time (June 1999) by Philip José Farmer
Temeraire
Nine Temeraire novels (2006-2016) by Naomi Novik, published by Del Rey books in the US.
X-Men

1. X-Men (2000 novelization) by Kristine Kathryn Rusch and Dean Wesley Smith
2. X-Men 2 (2003 novelization) by Chris Claremont
3. X-Men: The Last Stand (2006 novelization) by Chris Claremont
