= Twiggs (surname) =

Twiggs is a surname, and may refer to:

- Bob Twiggs, American aerospace engineer ad academic
- David E. Twiggs (1790–1862), American military officer and Confederate States Army general
- Greg Twiggs (born 1960), American professional golfer
- Hansford Dade Duncan Twiggs (1837–1917), American politician and judge from Georgia
- Jerry Twiggs (1933–2000), American politician from Idaho
- John Twiggs (1750–1816), American militia officer and politician
- Leo Twiggs (born 1934), American artist
- Levi Twiggs (1793–1847), American military officer
- Ralph Twiggs (1928–2003), American politician from Georgia
- Sarah Lowe Twiggs (1839–1920), American poet

== See also ==
- Twigg
