= Twiggs =

Twiggs may refer to:

In ships:

- USS Twiggs (DD-127), a US Navy destroyer during World War I
- USS Twiggs (DD-591), a US Navy destroyer during World War II

Geography

- Twiggs County, Georgia
- Twiggs, West Virginia

People with the surname Twiggs:

- Twiggs (surname)

== See also ==
- Twigg
