= Battle for Mexico City =

Series of engagements in September of 1847, during the Mexican–American War

Battle of Mexico City
- Part of the Mexican–American War
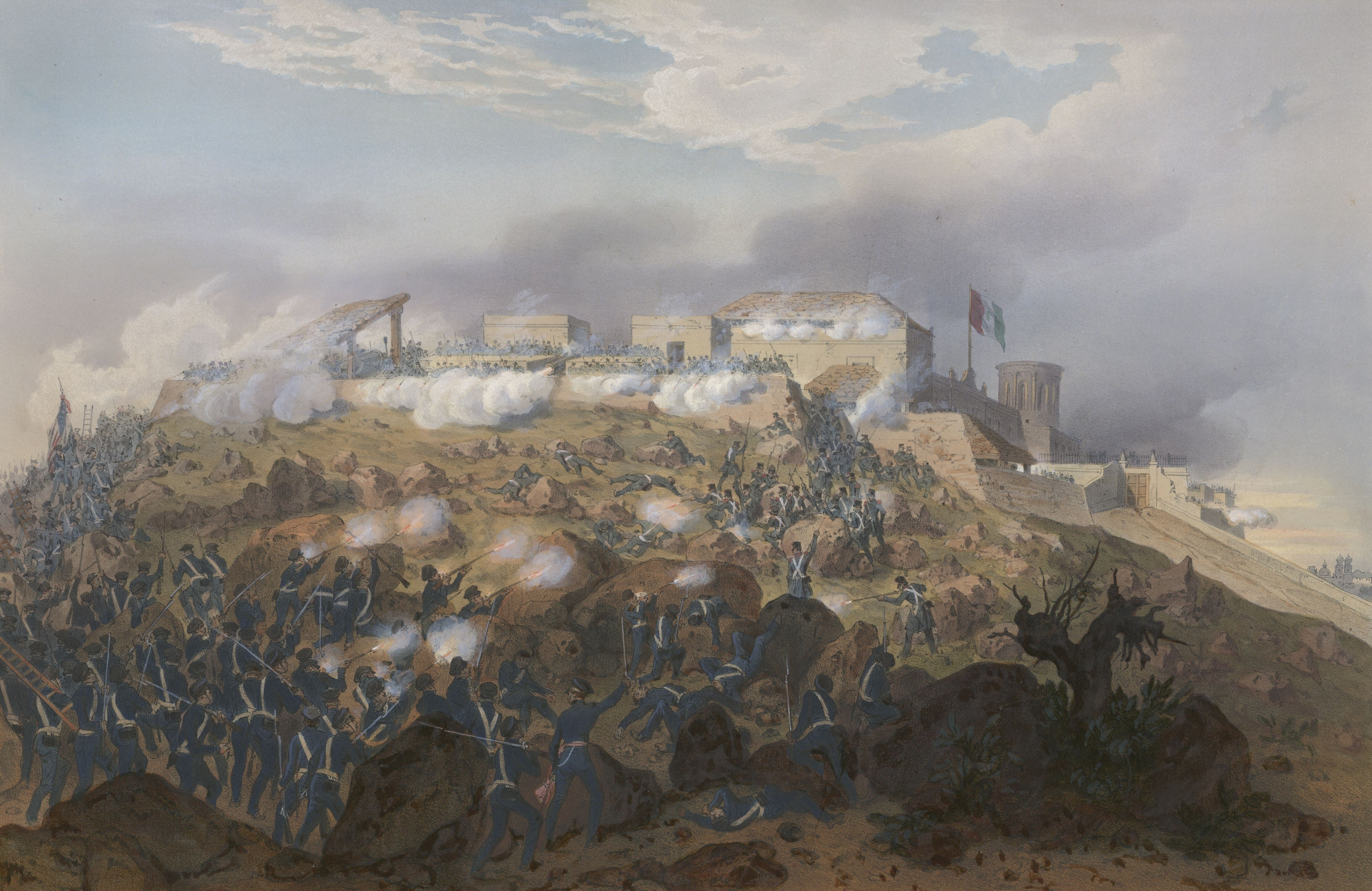
- Illustration of the battle by Carl Nebel
| Date | September 8–15, 1847 |
| Location | Mexico City, Federal District, Mexico |
| Result | American victory: American occupation of Mexico City |

Belligerents
| United States | Republic of Mexico |

Commanders and leaders
| Winfield Scott | Antonio López de Santa Anna |

Strength
| 20,000 | 13,000 |

Casualties and losses
| 246 killed 1,368 wounded 46 missing | 2,323 killed or wounded 3,000 captured |

The Battle for Mexico City refers to the series of engagements from September 8 to September 15, 1847, in the general vicinity of Mexico City during the Mexican–American War. Included are major actions at the battles of Molino del Rey and Chapultepec, culminating with the fall of Mexico City. The U.S. Army under Winfield Scott won a major victory that ended the war.

== Background ==
The major objective of American operations in central Mexico had been the capture of Mexico City. After capturing the port of Veracruz in March, General Winfield Scott was able to secure a base and move inland and defeat a large Mexican force at the Battle of Cerro Gordo. After routing the Mexicans at the Battle of Churubusco, Scott's army was less than eight kilometers (five miles) away from its objective of Mexico City.

== Battles ==
=== Molino del Rey ===
On September 8, the fight for Mexico City began. General Scott believed that a cannon foundry was located at the Molino del Rey, known as the King's Mill, located just over three kilometers (two miles) outside the city. Scott sent the 1st Division under William J. Worth to seize and destroy the foundry. Worth wished to include Chapultepec Castle in his attack, and when Scott refused, a bitter rivalry began between Scott and Worth. In the ensuing battle, both sides suffered heavy casualties, and Worth drove the Mexicans from the mill, separating them from the forces at Chapultepec. The battle produced no significant military gains for the U.S.

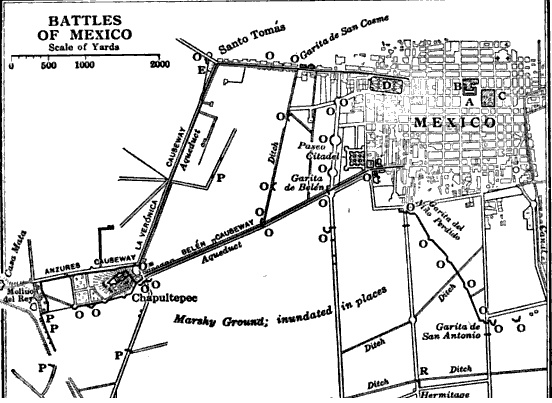
Molino del Rey is on the left. "O" depicts a Mexican battery, "P" an American battery, and "R" is Steptoe's battery

=== Chapultepec ===
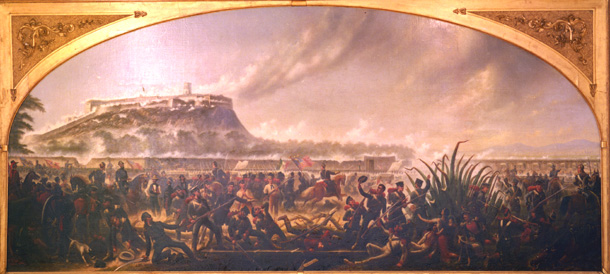
Storming of Chapultepec by James Walker (1858)

The main assault on the city came a few days later on September 12. Mexico City was guarded in part by Chapultepec Castle, which was being used as a military academy. Scott preceded an infantry assault with an all day artillery barrage on September 12. The next day, September 13, the 4th Division, under John A. Quitman, spearheaded the attack against Chapultepec and carried the castle. Future Confederate generals George E. Pickett and James Longstreet participated in the attack. Serving in the Mexican defense were the cadets later immortalized as the Niños Héroes ("Boy Heroes"). The Mexican forces fell back from Chapultepec and retreated within the city.

=== Attacks on the Belén and San Cosme Gates ===
Quitman's Division made its way down the Belén Causeway towards the Belén Gate, defended by General Terres & Colonel Garay with the 2d Mexico Activos (200 men) and 3 guns (1-12 lbs. & 2-8 lbs.), while Worth's Division further to the north made its way up La Verónica Causeway towards the San Cosme Gate, defended by General Rangel's Infantry Brigade (Granaderos Battalion (Adj. A. Manero), 1st Light (Comdte. L. Marquez), part 3d Light (Lt.Col. M.M. Echeagaray) and parts of Matamoros, Morelia and Santa Ana Battalions (Col. J.V. Gonzalez) with 3 guns (1-12 lb, 1-8 lb. and 1 howitzer 24 lbs). Quitman was merely supposed to make a feint towards the city, but he pushed forward his whole division and broke through the defenses. Santa Anna arrived at the Belén Gate in a fury and relieved the front commander. Worth's Division in the meantime had a slow start against the Mexicans after beating off a Mexican cavalry attack. When he reached San Cosme, he found its defenses ill-prepared, but the Mexicans defending it fought well before falling back. Ulysses S. Grant found his way into the action along the causeway on Worth's front and helped in hoisting a cannon into the belltower of a nearby church. From this spot Grant fired into the defenders below. When the fighting subsided on all fronts, both gates had fallen and the Mexicans had withdrawn into the city. Other gates defended were: San Antonio by General M. Martínez (3d & 4th Ligero & 11th Line with 10 guns) before withdrawing; Nino Perdido by the National Guards and 2 guns; and San Lázaro, Guadalupe and Villejo, which were defended by small infantry detachments. Other forces were stationed at la Piedad (1st & 2d Mexico Activos and Guanajunto Battalions), the Insurgente bridge (Gen. Arguelles : Invalidos and Lagos Battalion) and in the rear of these (Gen. Ramirez with 2d Ligero and various pickets) before withdrawing to the Citadel.

== Fall of Mexico City ==
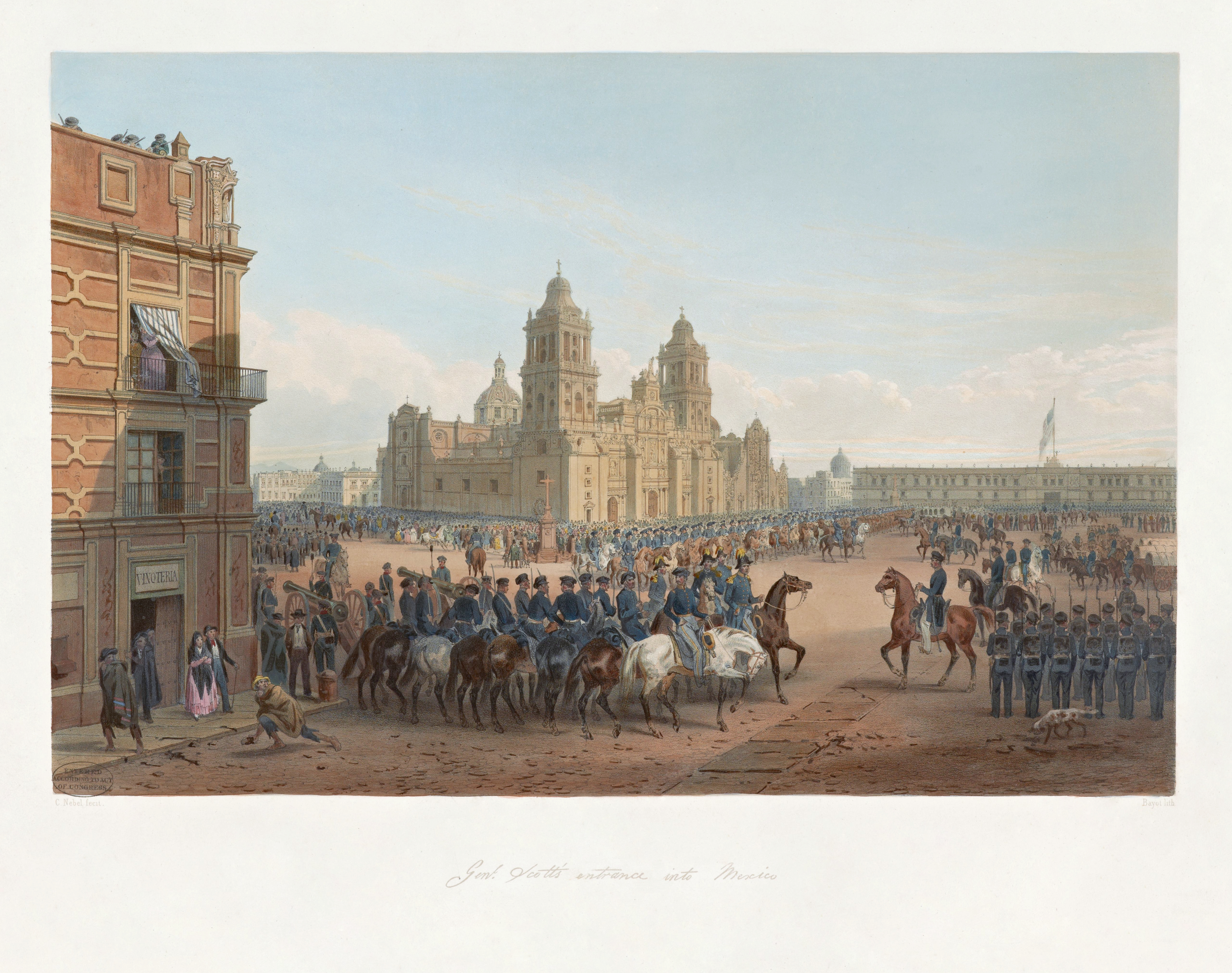
This Carl Nebel painting depicts Winfield Scott entering the Plaza de la Constitución; the Metropolitan Cathedral is in the background.

The Junta (Gens. Alcorta, Carrera, Lombardini & Fran. Pérez) had withdrawn their army: 14 Guns, 4,000 Cavalry (Quijano & Andrade Brigades), and 5,000 Infantry (Four Sections: 1) Gov. Olaguibel: Toluca National Guards, 2) Cmdte. Arroyo: Lagos, Iturbide, & Tula Battalions, 3) Gen. Martínez: various pickets, and 4) Gen. Pérez: 11th Infantry & remnants of Light Regts.) from the city during the night, and the U.S. forces, expecting another assault, found the city undefended. Worth and Quitman advanced cautiously. Quitman sent Lieutenant Pierre Beauregard to arrange the surrender of the ciudadela. Beauregard and Mansfield Lovell were met by a Mexican officer who asked for a receipt for the captured ciudadela (15 Guns). Beauregard exclaimed that "we give receipts at the point of their swords". Scott gave the honor of formally entering the city to Quitman's Division. The conquering army was less than impressing; the troops wore ragged and bloodstained uniforms and Quitman only had on one shoe when he marched into the city. Quitman marched into the Zócalo plaza in the center of the city in front of the National Palace where the formal surrender took place. As Worth's division entered the city, the leading unit was John Garland's brigade.

Stragglers from the Mexican army left in the city after Santa Anna's withdrawal climbed to the roofs of houses and began shooting at the American soldiers. General Garland was hit in the chest with the first shot and fell severely wounded. Before he evacuated, Santa Anna released 30,000 prisoners into the streets of the city, and these rooftop shots provoked the prisoners into similar acts. Worth did manage to get the shooting under control. William S. Harney's dragoons escorted General Scott into the city wearing his immaculate dress uniform and was greeted by patriotic music. Scott appointed the politically savvy Quitman as military governor, becoming the only American to ever rule from the National Palace.

== Order of battle ==
=== United States ===
US Army – Major General Winfield Scott

| Division | Brigade | Regiments and Others |
|---|---|---|
| 1st Division; MG William J. Worth | 1st Brigade; K-17, W-69, M-8 = 94 Brevet BG John Garland | 2nd U.S. Artillery – CPT Horace Brooks; 3rd U.S. Artillery – LTC Francis S. Belton; 4th Infantry – Maj. Francis Lee; Light Battery A, 2nd U.S. Artillery – CPT James Duncan |
| 1st Division; MG William J. Worth | 2nd Brigade; K-8, W-48, M-0 = 56 Brevet BG Newman S. Clarke | 5th US Infantry – Ltc James S. McIntosh; 6th US Infantry – Ltc Benjamin L. E. Bonneville; 8th US Infantry - Brevet Ltc George Wright |
| 2nd Division; MG David E. Twiggs | 1st Brigade; K-24, W-137, M-6 = 167 Brevet BG Persifor F. Smith; Ltc Samuel E. Watson | Mounted Rifles – Maj William W. Loring; Battalion, 1st U.S. Artillery (serving as infantry) - CPT Justin Dimick; 3rd US Infantry – Capt Edmund B. Alexander; Light Battery K, 1st U.S. Artillery – CPT Francis Taylor |
| 2nd Division; MG David E. Twiggs | 2nd Brigade; K-18, W-80, M-4 = 102 Brevet BG Bennet Riley | 2nd US Infantry – Brevet Ltc Thompson Morris; 7th US Infantry – Brevet Col Joseph Plympton; 4th U.S. Artillery – MAJ John L. Gardner |
| 3rd Division; MG Gideon Pillow (w) | 1st Brigade; K-12, W-41, M-1 = 54 BG Franklin Pierce | 9th US Infantry – Col Truman B. Ransom (k), Jones M. Withers; 12th US Infantry – Col Milledge L. Bonham; 15th US Infantry – Col George Washington Morgan; Light Battery I, 1st U.S. Artillery – CPT John B. Magruder |
| 3rd Division; MG Gideon Pillow (w) | 2nd Brigade; K-8, W-69, M-9 = 89 BG George Cadwallader | 11th US Infantry – Ltc William Montrose Graham (k); 14th US Infantry – Col William Trousdale (w); Voltigeurs – Col Timothy Patrick Andrews, Ltc Joseph E. Johnston |
| 4th Division; MG John A. Quitman | 1st Brigade; K-35, W-245, M-0 = 280 BG James Shields | 2nd New York Infantry – Col Ward B. Burnett; 2nd Pennsylvania Infantry – Col William B. Roberts; South Carolina Palmetto Infantry – Maj Adley H. Gladden; Light Battery H, 3rd U.S. Artillery – CPT Edward J. Steptoe |
| 4th Division; MG John A. Quitman | 2nd Brigade; K-7, W-24, M-0 = 31 Ltc Samuel E. Watson | Marine Battalion – Maj Levi Twiggs (mw), Maj William Dulany; 2nd Pennsylvania Infantry, detachment |
| Dragoons | Dragoon Brigade Brevet BG William S. Harney | 1st US Dragoons, Company F – Capt Philip Kearny; 2nd US Dragoons – Brevet Col Edwin V. Sumner; 3rd US Dragoons – Ltc Thomas P. Moore |

=== Mexico ===
7 August 1847—20,210 men and 104 artillery pieces acs

Mexican Army General Antonio López de Santa Anna

Bodyguard: 50+ men of the San Patricios

Chief of Artillery: General Martín Carrera

- Commandante general-Col. José Gil de Partearroyo
- Foot Artillery Battalion-Col. Aguado
- Cavalry Art. Battalion-Iglesias

Chief of Engineers: General Ignacio Mora y Villamil

- Gens. Casimiro Liceaga, Monterde and Miguel Blanco
- Army of the East General Manuel Lombardini
  - 1st Brigade General Andres Terres (1st Activos, Lakes and 2nd Light Battalions)
  - 2nd Brigade General Mariano Martínez (Morelia Activos, Invalids Corps)
  - 3rd Brigade General Joaquin Rangel (Mixto Sta Anna, Morelia National Guards)
  - 4th Brigade General Francisco Perez (1st, 3rd & 4th Light, 11th Infantry)
  - 5th Brigade General Antonio León (Oajaca & Querétaro Activos, 10th Infantry, Querétaro & Mina National Guards)
  - 6th Brigade General Pedro María de Anaya (Independencia, Bravos, Victoria & Hidalgo National Guards)
  - 7th Brigade Col. Anastasio Zerecero (Acapulco, parts Tlapa & Libertad pickets)
- Army of the North General Gabriel Valencia deputy Gen. Mariano Salas 3,000 Infantry, 1,000 Cavalry & 500 Artillery
  - Vanguard Brigade General Francisco Mejia ( 700 infantry: Fijo de Mexico, Potosi Activos,400 cavalry: 7th Cavalry) and 3-12 lbs guns & 4 howitzers.
  - Centre Brigade General Anastasio Parrodi ( 1,500 infantry: 10th and 11th Infantry, Tampico Coast Guards, Querétaro, Celaya and Guanajuato Activos, Celaya Auxiliary) and 6-8 lbs guns and 2 howitzers.
  - Reserve Brigade General Mariano Salas ( 800 infantry: Engineers, Mixto Santa Anna, Aguascalientes Activos, 400 cavalry: 2nd, 3rd & 8th Cavalry, Guanajuato Cavalry) and 7 light guns.
- Army of the South General Juan Álvarez 2,762 Cavalry
  - Cavalry Division (GMT Games lists:
    - Alvarez Brigade-2d,3d,5th & 9th Line Casvalry, Tulancingo Cuirassiers
    - Andrade Brigade-Oaxaca and Michoacan Cavalry Battalions

Alcaraz, Ramon "Apuntes para la historia de la guerra entre Mexico...†

== Casualties ==
=== September 8 ===
- U.S. 116 killed, 665 wounded, 17 missing, 789 total
- Mexican 2,700 total

=== September 12–15 ===
- U.S. 130 killed, 703 wounded, 29 missing, 862 total
- Mexican 1,800 killed and wounded, 823 captured, 2,623 total

=== Totals ===
- U.S. 1,651
- Mexican 5,323

== See also ==
- Battle of Molino del Rey
- Battles of the Mexican–American War
- Marines' hymn
- Mexican–American War
- Mexican Cession
- Saint Patrick's Battalion

== Notes ==
Lieutenant Colonel James S. McIntosh temporarily commanded Clarke's brigade at Molino del Rey; Clarke returned to command after McIntosh was killed during the fighting.
