= David Emanuel (politician) =

American politician

24th Governor of Georgia
- In office March 3, 1801 – November 7, 1801
- Preceded by: James Jackson
- Succeeded by: Josiah Tattnall

Personal details
- Born: 1744 Pennsylvania, U.S.
- Died: February 19, 1808 (aged 63–64) Burke County, Georgia, U.S.
- Party: Democratic-Republican
- Spouse: Ann Lewis
- Children: 6

David Emanuel (1744 – February 19, 1808) became 24th governor of Georgia on March 3, 1801 upon the resignation of James Jackson to become a U.S. senator from Georgia. Emanuel served until November 7, 1801, the remainder of Jackson's term, but did not seek re-election. Emanuel was a member of the Democratic Republican Party. Prior to serving as governor, he served as president of the Georgia Senate.

== Heritage ==
Some historians believe Emanuel to be the first governor of Jewish heritage of any U.S. state, while others believe that he was Presbyterian. If true, he would be the first person of Jewish descent to hold public office in the United States. One early claim that he was Jewish seems to have been based mainly on hearsay in Savannah, Georgia, and a letter from a descendant of David Emanuel's sister Ruth Emanuel Twiggs, Judge H.D.D. Twiggs of Savannah, who stated, "I do not know where Governor David Emanuel came from, I only know that, beyond doubt, he was a Jew." Judge Twiggs was born some years after David Emanuel had died, and so would not have had first hand knowledge of his heritage.

At least one person of Jewish heritage married into the Twiggs family, that being Abraham Myers who married David Emanuel Twiggs' daughter, Marion. Another argument provided for Emanuel having Jewish ancestry is the preponderance of Old Testament names in the Emanuel family tree. However, other researchers believe that David Emanuel was Presbyterian and of Welsh heritage. His family was closely associated with the Welsh community that originally settled in Chester County, Pennsylvania, around 1700. One Emanuel family researcher has found evidence that David Emanuel was a grandson of Emanuel Jones, of Wales, and believes that the name "Emanuel" became the family surname because of the idiosyncrasies of the Welsh patronymic naming system. The use of Old Testament names was actually common among Protestant Christians in some parts of Wales. Emanuel Jones was at one time a trustee of the Presbyterian church in Charlestown, Pennsylvania.

== Life and career ==
Few details of Emanuel's early life are known, but according to the Georgia State Archives he was born in 1744 in Pennsylvania. He served as a captain and colonel in the Georgia Militia during the American Revolution under the command of his brother-in-law General John Twiggs. During the war, he is reported to have been captured by loyalists and barely escaped execution. He represented his home county of Burke County in the Georgia legislature.

Emanuel also served on the commission that investigated the Yazoo land scandal. Emanuel County, Georgia, is named in his honor. After Governor James Jackson resigned in 1801 to take a seat in the U.S. Senate, Emanuel, as president of the state senate, became acting governor. Overall he served three times as President of the Georgia Senate.

Political offices
Preceded by James Jackson	Governor of Georgia; 1801	Succeeded by Josiah Tattnall
