= Battle of Molino del Rey =

1847 battle of the Mexican–American War

Coordinates: 19.419°N 99.191°W

- Part of the Mexican–American War
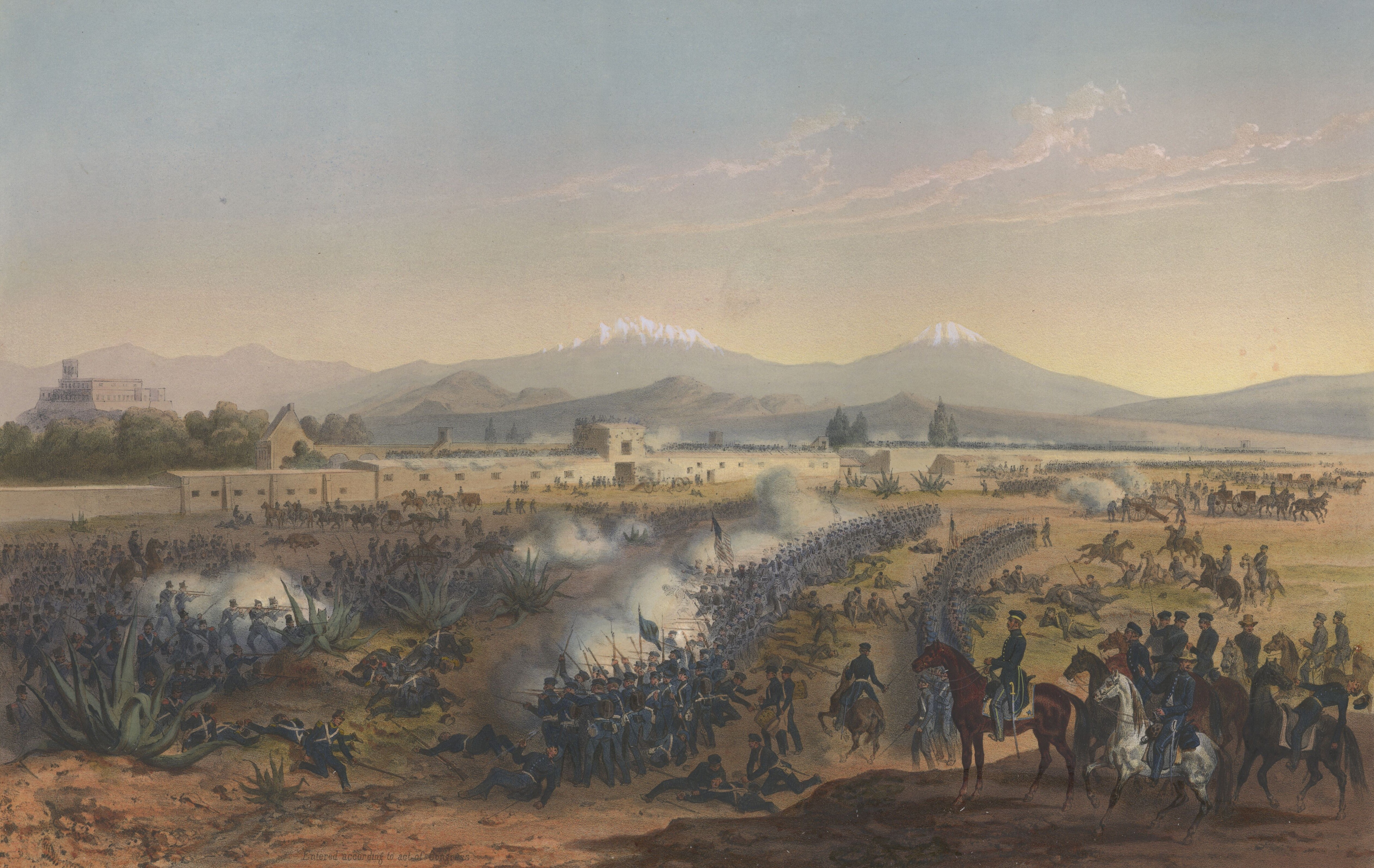
- Illustration of the battle by Carl Nebel
Date	8 September 1847
Location	Mexico City
Result	American victory

Belligerents
United States	Mexico

Commanders and leaders
(United States) Winfield Scott (United States) William J. Worth	(Mexico) Antonio León † (Mexico) Francisco Pérez (Mexico) Lucas Balderas †

Strength
9,800	4,000

Casualties and losses
116 killed 671 wounded 18 missing	269 killed 500 wounded. 685 captured

The Battle of Molino del Rey (8 September 1847) was one of the bloodiest engagements of the Mexican–American War as part of the Battle for Mexico City. It was fought in September 1847 between Mexican forces under General Antonio León against an American force under Major General Winfield Scott at El Molino del Rey on the fringes of Mexico City. The Americans made little progress in this battle, but the Mexican forces were unable to hold them back long enough to prevent the capture of Mexico City one week later. Ulysses S. Grant served as a captain during this battle.

== Background ==
The Americans were camped south of Mexico City, Scott and Worth's division at Tacubaya, Gideon Johnson Pillow's division at Mixcoac, David E. Twiggs division at San Ángel, and John A. Quitman's division at San Agustín.

On 6 September 1847, Scott ended the armistice following the Battle of Churubusco as negotiations broke down, as it became clear that Antonio López de Santa Anna was preparing to resume fighting. On 7 September, a large number of Mexican horsemen were observed around a group of low, massive stone buildings known as El Molino del Rey or King's Mill. Spread across the distance of this point, they were about 1,000 yards (0.91 km) west of the Castle at Chapultepec, which itself was about 2 mi (3 km) from the gates of Mexico City. A large grove of trees separated the mill from the castle, while the castle's batteries covered the area.

General Winfield Scott received reports that the trees masked a foundry for casting cannon, and rumors told that Antonio López de Santa Anna, leader of both the Mexican government and military, in desperate need of ordnance, was sending out church and convent bells to have them melted down and converted to cannon. Scott ordered General Worth to attack and take the mill, break up the factory, and destroy any munitions found.

Molino del Rey was manned by Brigadier Antonio León's Oaxaca Brigade, while Brigadier General Francisco Pérez manned the Casa Mata, and Brigadier General Simeón Ramírez's brigade with seven guns manned the ditch connecting the two. General Juan Álvarez's 4,000 cavalry waited in reserve at the Hacienda Morales.

The National Guard Battalions of Liberty, Union, Querétaro, and Mina were commanded by General León (1,400 men and three 8-lb guns), and the brigade of troops (Grenaderos, San Blas Activos, Mixto de Santa Ana, and Morelia Battalions) were commanded by General Joaquín Rangel. The 2nd light battalion, that of the Fijo the Mejico, and the 1st and 12th regiments of the line, with six pieces of artillery, were commanded by General Simeón Ramírez. The 4th light battalion (600 men)and 11th regiment of the line (900 men), were commanded by General Francisco Pérez. In the grove of Chapultepec was the reserve 1st and 3d light battalions (700 men).

== Battle ==
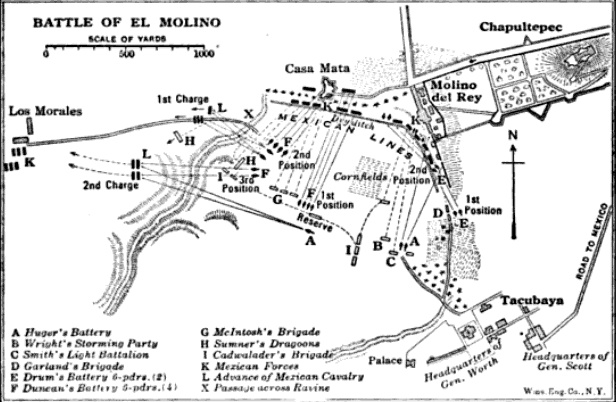
Disposition of forces

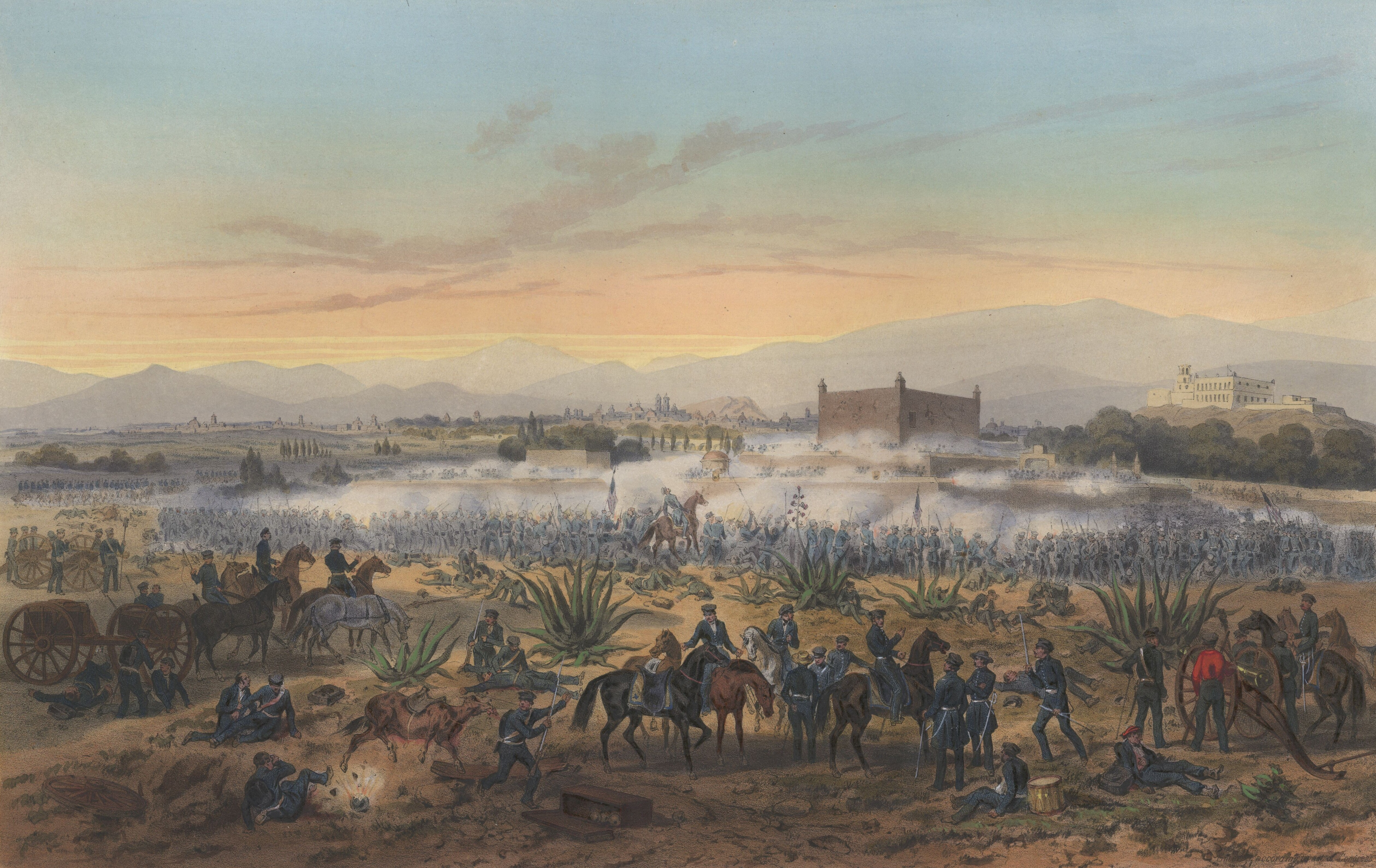
Molina del Rey and Casa Mata. Carl Nebel

At 5:45 am, on 8 September, Worth sent an assault column of 500 men, assembled from the various units of his division and led by Major George Wright of the 8th Infantry, down a gently sloping plain against the western end of the buildings. Behind them, he placed Colonel Charles F. Smith's light battalion and George Cadwalader's brigade in the center, and to their right was Garland's brigade and a battery under Captain Simon H. Drum. On the left, attacking the Casa Mata, was Colonel James Duncan's battery and a brigade commanded by Colonel James S. McIntosh. Major Edwin Vose Sumner commanded three squadrons of dragoons on the left flank. Captain Benjamin Huger's heavy guns provided support.

Major Wright's force came under intense artillery and small-arms fire, which drove them back, killing or wounding 11 of 14 officers. Lt. Col. Miguel Maria Echeagaray's 3d Light Infantry launched a counterattack, prompting Worth to send in Capt. Ephraim Kirby Smith's light battalion. Similarly, McIntosh's men withdrew in the face of a counterattack, but Duncan's guns forced Pérez's men to withdraw from Casa Mata.

Worth sent the Voltigeur Regiment and the 11th Infantry into the assault, while Scott sent in the 9th Infantry. General León and Col. Lucas Balderas were killed. Brigadier General Matías Peña y Barragán led two counterattacks, but the Americans were able to force two gates and then fight room-to-room to take the mill after 2 hours, but found only a few gun molds. The Casa Mata caught fire and blew up near noon, causing more casualties, but by 1:00 pm, the Americans were back where they started. 685 Mexicans were taken prisoner and historian K. Jack Bauer estimates their killed and wounded at about 2,000.

== Aftermath ==
Col. Hitchcock called the battle a Pyrrhic victory for the Americans. Scott still needed an assault path into the city, despite the destruction of Molino del Rey. Preparations began immediately thereafter for the Battle of Chapultepec.

== See also ==
- List of battles of the Mexican–American War
