= Sarah Lowe Twiggs =

American poet (1839–1920)

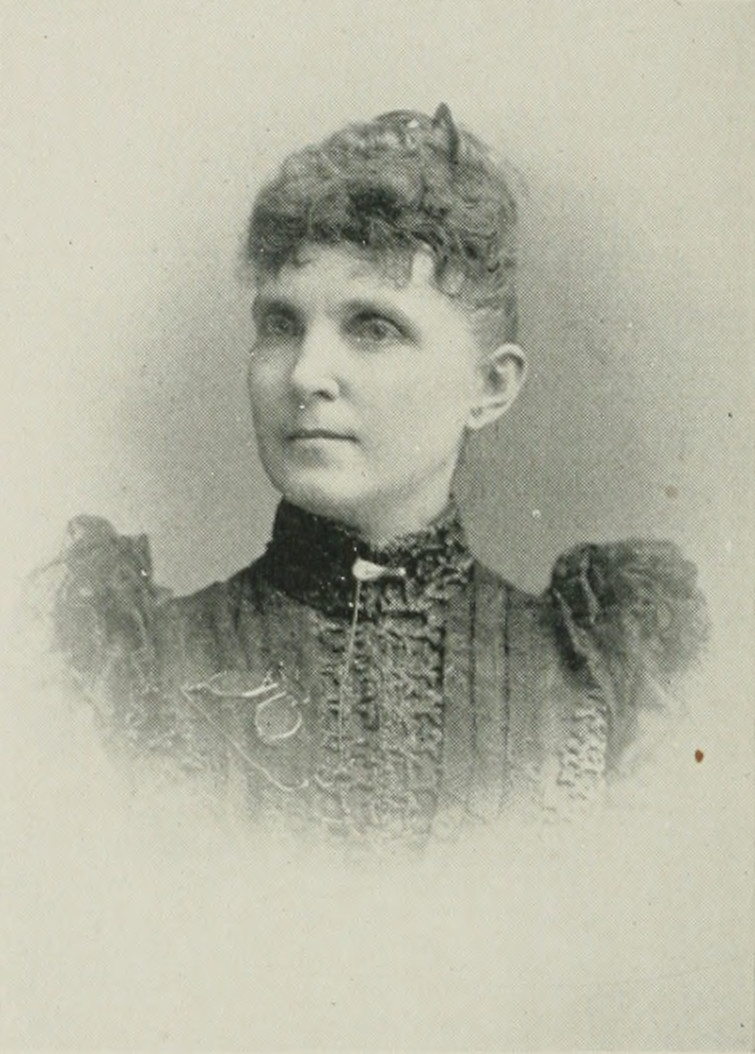
- "A Woman of the Century"
- Born: March 29, 1839; Barnwell County, South Carolina, US
- Died: February 7, 1920 (aged 80); Augusta, Georgia, US
- Resting place: Summerville Cemetery, Augusta
- Education: Greensboro Female College
- Occupation: poet
- Spouse: Joseph Erwin (m. 1870; died 1911)
- Children: 3
- Relatives: H. D. D. Twiggs (brother); John Twiggs (great-grandfather); David E. Twiggs (great-uncle)
- Writing career
- Pen name: S. L. Twiggs
- Language: English

Sarah Lowe Twiggs (pen name, S. L. Twiggs; March 29, 1839 – February 7, 1920) was an American poet. She was employed by the Department of the Interior and the Treasury Department.

== Biography ==
Sarah Lowe Twiggs was born in Barnwell County, South Carolina, March 29, 1839. Her parents were Major George Lowe and Harriet Eliza (Duncan) Twiggs. She lived from earliest infancy to womanhood in one of the southern homesteads that lie along the Savannah river border, near Augusta, Georgia. Her great-grandfather, Gen. John Twiggs, was a leader in the Georgia Militia during the American Revolutionary War. Her ancestors were Swedish Norsemen. The first of the name came to the US in company with Gen. James Oglethorpe, bearing a large grant of land from George III. Gen. David E. Twiggs, of Mexican–American War notability, was her great-uncle, and she was a sister of Judge H. D. D. Twiggs, the Georgia barrister. Her father was a successful southern punter, who cared more for blooded horses and well-trained pointers than for literary pursuits. Her literary tastes were inherited from her mother. She was the only daughter in a family of five children.

Twiggs received her education at Greensboro Female College (now Greensboro College) in Greensboro, North Carolina.

From a life of southern ease and affluence, her situation deteriorated with the civil war.

On March 23, 1870, she married Joseph Erwin (1837–1911). The couple had three children, Lillian (1870), Eliza (1872–1880), and Harold (1874–1926). The marriage failed, (Note: The 1911 obituary of Judge Joseph Erwin states he was survived by his two children and a sister. Though Twiggs outlived him, she is not mentioned.) and in 1885, with the two surviving children, Twiggs was living in Washington, D.C. There, she succeeded in achieving a comfortable independence. In 1889, she received an appointment to the Pensions Office, Department of the Interior, a transfer from the Treasury Department. She resigned from the Pensions Office in 1904.

One of her poems, "Nostri Mortui," and several idylls, which appeared in southern journals, elicited flattering mention. Always active locally in literary pursuits, she was the author of, "In the True Wonder Land", an epic poem; as well as a play and numerous short poems. Her Christmas Eve (1913) is described in The Assembly Herald as a "delightful Christmas story". Of The supreme adventure (1919), W. C. Rodman with The New-Church Review wrote,— "In spite of its somewhat pedantic vocabulary, its too often inverted and sometimes stilted style, its unaccountably frequent substitution of the overworked apostrophe for the useful letter e, and its irritating derangement of lines,–triumphantly in spite of these "The Supreme Adventure" is an extraordinary performance. Of all its two hundred and thirty-nine pages, not one is prosy; the reader's interest is captured at once, and held to the end. The work is pure poetry, conceived in sincerity, and executed with fidelity and unquestionable skill."

Twiggs was opposed to women's suffrage. In religion, she was a member of The New Church (Swedenborgian).

Twiggs died in Augusta, Georgia, February 7, 1920, and was buried in that city's Summerville Cemetery.

== Selected works ==
- Her Christmas Eve, 1913
- The supreme adventure, 1919 (Text)
