= William A. Connelly =

Sixth Sergeant Major of the US Army

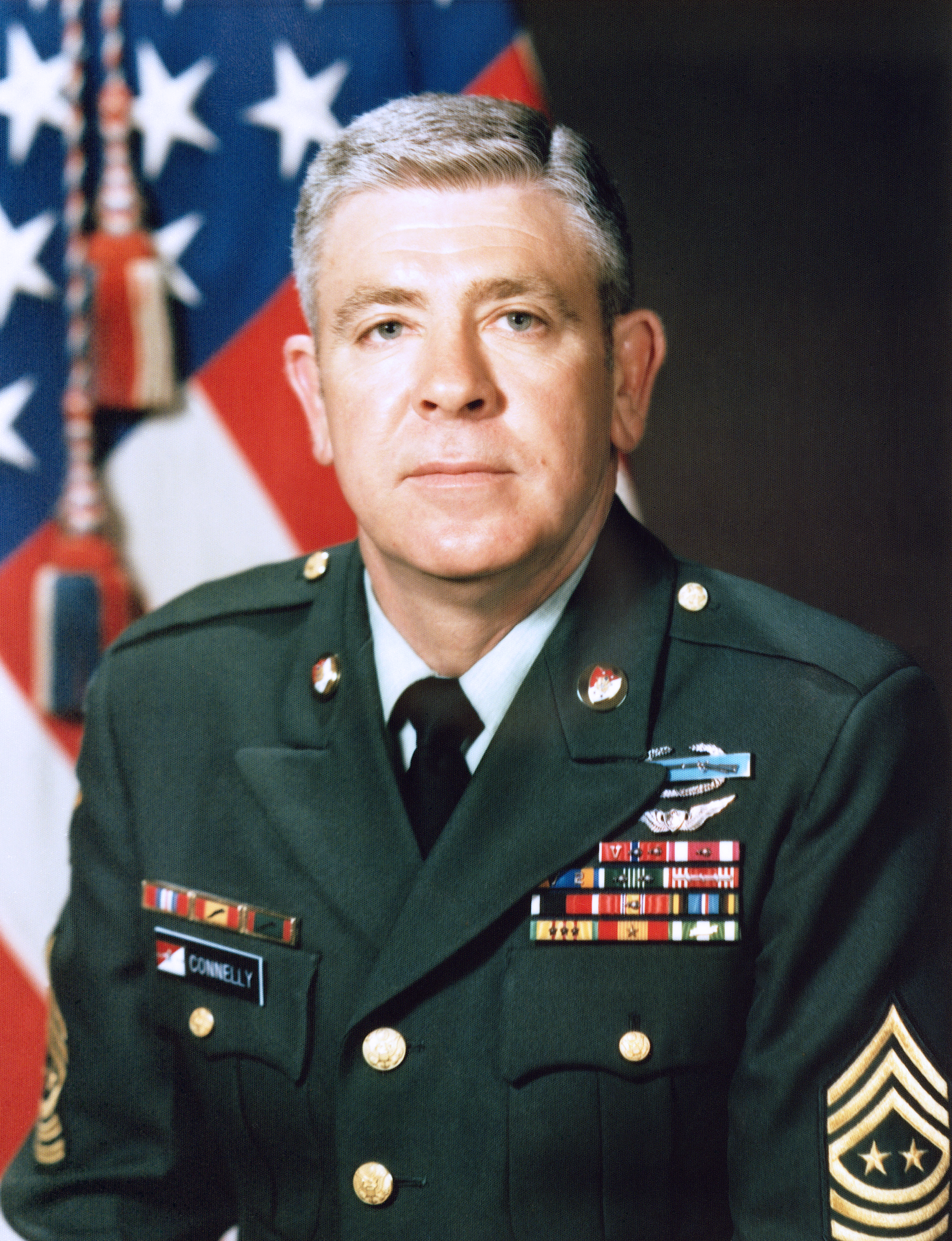
- Sergeant Major of the Army William A. Connelly
- Born: June 2, 1931; Monticello, Georgia, U.S.
- Died: November 24, 2019 (aged 88); Monticello, Georgia, U.S.
- Burial place: Monticello, Georgia
- Military career
- Allegiance: United States
- Branch: United States Army
- Service years: 1954–1983
- Rank: Sergeant Major of the Army
- Conflicts: Dominican Civil War; Vietnam War
- Awards: Army Distinguished Service Medal; Bronze Star Medal (3); Meritorious Service Medal (2); Air Medal (2); Army Commendation Medal (3)

William A. Connelly (June 2, 1931 – November 24, 2019) was a United States Army soldier who served as the sixth Sergeant Major of the Army. He was sworn in on July 2, 1979, and served until June 1983.

== Early life ==
Connelly was born on 2 June 1931 in Monticello, Georgia where he attended high school and worked as a peach packer. He attended Georgia Southwestern College.

== Military career ==
He enlisted in the Georgia National Guard in 1949 to help pay his college tuition. He was a member of Co. C., 190th Tank Bn. in Americus, Georgia. By the time he finished college, he had been promoted to sergeant.

He volunteered for the draft in March 1954 and was reverted to the rank of private until a personnel officer found his National Guard records. Connelly was a tank crewman, tank commander, platoon sergeant and first sergeant in the 761st Tank Battalion, 3rd Armored Division at Fort Knox, Kentucky. The first of his four tours in Europe was with the 826th Tank Battalion at Hammelburg and Schweinfurt, Germany, from January 1955 until November 1956. The 826th returned to Fort Benning, Georgia, where Connelly served as an Operations Sergeant and platoon sergeant until August 1958. He returned to Europe, serving as platoon sergeant with the 2/67th Armor, 4th Armored Division in Fürth, Germany, from August 1958 through September 1961. He was back in the United States at Fort Stewart, Georgia, as a platoon sergeant with the 3d Medium Tank Battalion, 32d Armor for less than 30 days when that unit was sent to Germany as part of the build up during the Berlin crisis of October 1961.

Connelly remained in Augsburg serving as a platoon sergeant with the 3/32d Armor until November 1962. He was assigned to Munich, Germany, as a first sergeant and Operations Sergeant in the 32nd Tank Battalion, and 24th Infantry Division. Back at Fort Stewart, Georgia, in August 1964, Connelly served as first sergeant of Company C, 4th Battalion, 68th Armor, 2d Infantry Division. In October 1965, his company was ordered to the Dominican Republic, where it served until July 1966. In January 1967, Connelly assumed duties as Chief Enlisted Adviser to the Cavalry Squadron or the Georgia National Guard, headquartered in Griffin, Georgia.

Connelly had combat duty in Vietnam as first sergeant of Troop B, 1st Squadron, 9th Cavalry, 1st Cavalry Division from October 1969 to November 1970. From then until May 1973, Connelly served at Fort Knox, Kentucky as first sergeant of the reception Station and several companies of the First Training Brigade, as well as sergeant major of the 1st and 2d Battalions.

In June 1973 he attended the Sergeants Major Academy and then Connelly was assigned to Germany for his fourth European tour. Connelly initially served as sergeant major of the 1/35th Armor, 1st Armored Division at Erlangen. In June 1975, he became sergeant major of the Seventh Army Training Command Grafenwöhr and in July 1976, became sergeant major of the 1st Armored Division at Ansbach. From that position, he was nominated and selected to the position of sergeant major of the United States Army Forces Command, Fort McPherson, Georgia, in July 1977.

Connelly was selected as sixth Sergeant Major of the Army (SMA), serving 2 July 1979 to June 1983. He was the first SMA to have graduated from the Sergeants Major Academy. General John A. Wickham Jr. gave Connelly his concept of the SMA position - gather information on the enlisted force, provide honest criticism and develop the NCO corps. His focus was training the fundamentals of good soldiering. He also recommended improvements for dependent change of station travel, pay increases for enlisted soldiers and the establishment of the Army College Fund. He pushed for the elimination of specialist ranks above the rank of E-4.

== Awards and decorations ==
Combat Infantryman Badge
Army Basic Aircrewman Badge

Doughboy Award Primicerius- [Order of Saint Maurice Medal]

| Army Distinguished Service Medal |
| Bronze Star with Valor device and two oak leaf clusters |
| Meritorious Service Medal with oak leaf cluster |
| Air Medal with Valor Device and award numeral 2 |
| Army Commendation Medal with two oak leaf clusters |
| Valorous Unit Award |
| Army Good Conduct Medal (9 awards) |
| Army of Occupation Medal |
| National Defense Service Medal with oak leaf cluster |
| Armed Forces Expeditionary Medal |
| Vietnam Service Medal with three service stars |
| Vietnam Gallantry Cross with bronze star |
| Republic of Vietnam Gallantry Cross Unit Citation |
| Republic of Vietnam Civil Actions Medal Unit Citation |
| Republic of Vietnam Campaign Medal |

- 9 Service stripes.

Military offices
| Preceded by William G. Bainbridge | Sergeant Major of the Army; 1979—1983 | Succeeded by Glen E. Morrell |
