= Glen E. Morrell =

Seventh Sergeant Major of the US Army

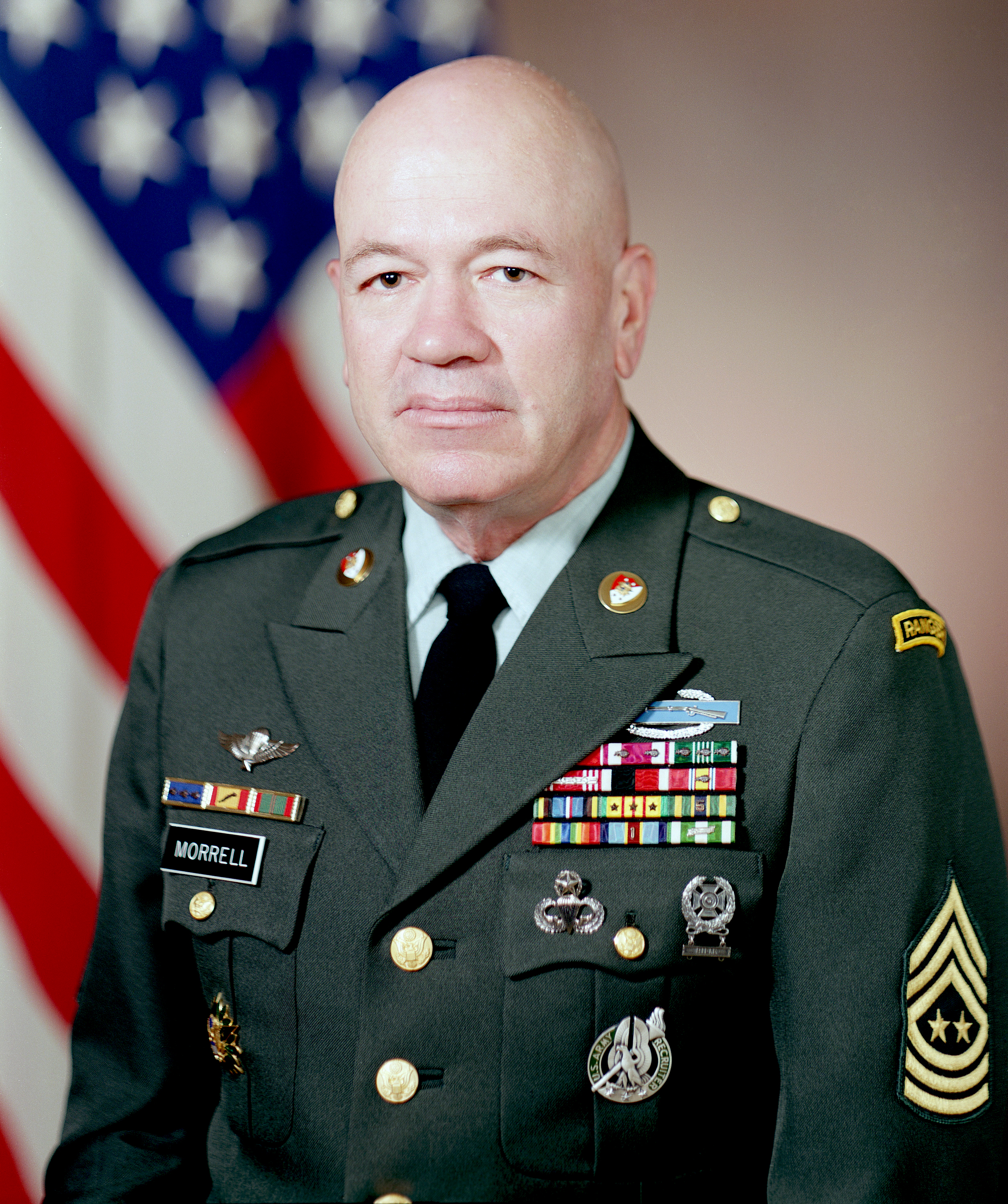
- Sergeant Major of the Army Glen E. Morrell
- Born: May 26, 1936; Wick, West Virginia, U.S.
- Died: October 26, 2023 (aged 87); Cocoa, Florida, U.S.
- Military career
- Allegiance: United States
- Branch: United States Army
- Service years: 1954–1987
- Rank: Sergeant Major of the Army
- Conflicts: Vietnam War
- Awards: Army Distinguished Service Medal; Bronze Star Medal; Meritorious Service Medal (3); Army Commendation Medal (4)

Glen E. Morrell (1936–2023) was a United States Army soldier who served as the seventh Sergeant Major of the Army. He was sworn in on July 1, 1983, and served until July 1987.

== Early life ==
Morrell was born in Wick, West Virginia, on 26 May 1936. As a boy, he wanted to follow his father, a World War II veteran and learn to jump out of airplanes, like his older brother who was a Korean War paratrooper.

== Military career ==
Morrell served in the United States Army for over 32 years. After his enlistment on active duty in November 1954 he was inducted at Fort Jackson, South Carolina and then went to basic training at Camp Gordon, Georgia. After basic training, he was assigned to Battery A, 319th Field Artillery Regt., 82nd Airborne Division at Fort Bragg, North Carolina where he attended jump school. He left the army after his enlistment ended, but reenlisted in January 1958 as a sergeant and returned to the 82nd Airborne.

Soon after returning to the army, he was send to Berlin as part of Combat Support Co., 2d Battle Group, 6th Infantry Division. There he attended the NCO academy. In 1960, he was transferred to the 14th Armored Cavalry in Fulda in a mechanized howitzer battery.

In 1962 he volunteered for Special Forces training at Fort Bragg. He finished training and was promoted to Staff Sergeant and assigned to Company C, 5th Special Forces Group as a heavy weapons specialist. He was sent to Vietnam in January 1963 to train local Vietnamese security forces.

He returned to the United States and was promoted to Sergeant First Class and the 5th Special Forces Group. In 1964, he was sent back to Vietnam for a year. He again returned to Special Forces as an instructor, attending Jumpmaster School in 1965. In 1967 he was sent for Spanish language training and then to 8th Special Forces Group in Panama where he was a trainer at the Jungle Operations Training Center.

In 1969, he returned for a third assignment in Vietnam. He was promoted to master sergeant and was sent back to Panama until 1973 when he was sent to the Sergeant Major's Academy at Fort Bliss. He also earned an associates degree from El Paso Community College. His next assignment, in 1973, was as First Sergeant of Company A, 1st Bn., 2nd Infantry Regt., 1st Infantry Division at Fort Riley, Kansas.

In 1976, he was promoted to E-9 at his new assignment with the Reserve Officer Training Corps (ROTC) at St. John’s University in St. Cloud, Minnesota. In 1977, Morrell attended Ranger School at Fort Benning, Georgia at the age of forty-one and was selected as the Distinguished Honor Graduate for his class. He then became the sergeant major of the 1st Ranger Bn., 75th Infantry at Fort Stewart, Georgia.

In July 1979, he returned to Germany, with 10th Special Forces Detachment at Flint Kaserne in Bad Tölz. In 1981, he was send to Army Recruiting Command (USAREC), Fort Sheridan, Illinois. In June 1982 he became the command sergeant major of the U.S. Army Forces Command (FORSCOM).

Morrell became Sergeant Major of the Army (SMA) on 1 July 1983. His priorities included improved pay for First Sergeants and Command Sergeants Major, final elimination of specialists ranks over E-4, and to have NCOs focus on teaching basic skills and improving the welfare of their troops. He retired 30 June 1987 at Fort Myer.

The US Army Recruiting Command established the Glen E. Morrell Award for Recruiting Excellence in his honor. This medallion is the ultimate award under the Recruiting Incentive Awards Program. It includes a medallion that the recipient wears as part of their Army uniform. In addition to the medallion, a ring and a certificate for the recruiter (and the recruiter's spouse, if applicable) will be awarded.

== Awards and decorations ==
Combat Infantryman Badge
Ranger tab
Master Parachutist Badge
Army Staff Identification Badge
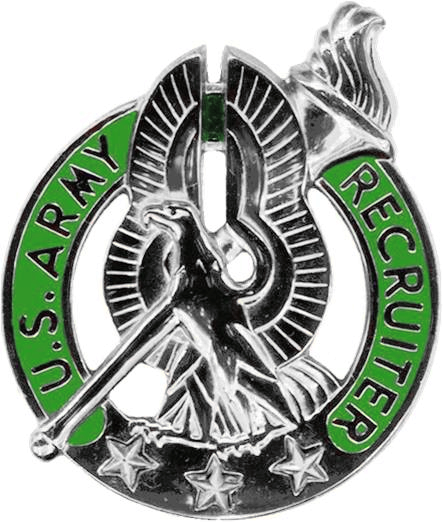
Silver Recruiter Badge
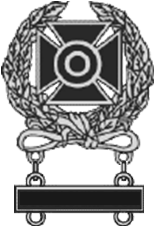
Expert Marksman Badge with one weapon clasp
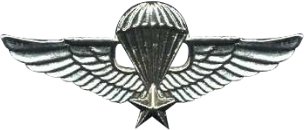
Vietnam Parachutist Badge

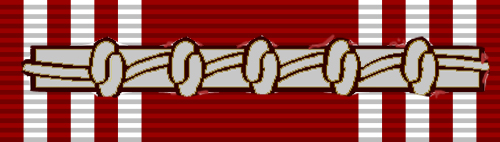
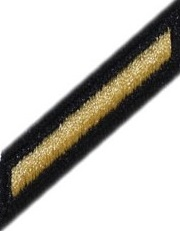
| Distinguished Service Medal |
| Bronze Star |
| Meritorious Service Medal with two oak leaf clusters |
| Army Commendation Medal with three oak leaf clusters |
| Presidential Unit Citation with three oak leaf clusters |
| Good Conduct Medal (10 awards) |
| Army of Occupation Medal |
| National Defense Service Medal with oak leaf cluster |
| Armed Forces Expeditionary Medal |
| Vietnam Service Medal with three campaign stars |
| NCO Professional Education Ribbon with bronze award numeral 5 |
| Army Service Ribbon |
| Overseas Service Ribbon with award numeral 1 |
| Republic of Vietnam Gallantry Cross Unit Citation |
| Republic of Vietnam Civil Actions Medal Unit Citation |
| Vietnam Campaign Medal |
| 10 Service stripes. |

Military offices
| Preceded by William A. Connelly | Sergeant Major of the Army; 1983—1987 | Succeeded by Julius W. Gates |
