= Sugar Valley, Pleasants County, West Virginia =

Sugar Valley
- Unincorporated community
- Location within the state of West Virginia Sugar Valley (the United States)
- Coordinates: 39°25′10″N 81°5′13″W
- Country: United States
- State: West Virginia
- County: Pleasants
- Elevation: 614 ft (187 m)
- Time zone: UTC-5 (Eastern (EST))
  - Summer (DST): UTC-4 (EDT)
- GNIS ID: 1555736

Sugar Valley is an unincorporated community in Pleasants County, West Virginia, United States. The community is located at the confluence of Sugar Creek and Middle Island Creek.

The community takes its name from nearby Sugar Creek.
