= Wick, West Virginia =

Wick
- Unincorporated community
- Location within the state of West Virginia Wick (the United States)
- Coordinates: 39°24′47″N 80°58′26″W
- Country: United States
- State: West Virginia
- County: Tyler
- Elevation: 764 ft (233 m)
- Time zone: UTC-5 (Eastern (EST))
  - Summer (DST): UTC-4 (EDT)
- ZIP codes: 26149
- Area code: 304
- FIPS code: 1549119

Wick is an unincorporated community in Tyler County, West Virginia, United States, along Sugar Creek.

The community most likely was named after the local Wick family.

== Notable person ==
- Glen E. Morrell, born May 26, 1936; seventh Sergeant Major of the Army, United States Army.
