= Sugar Creek (Middle Island Creek tributary) =

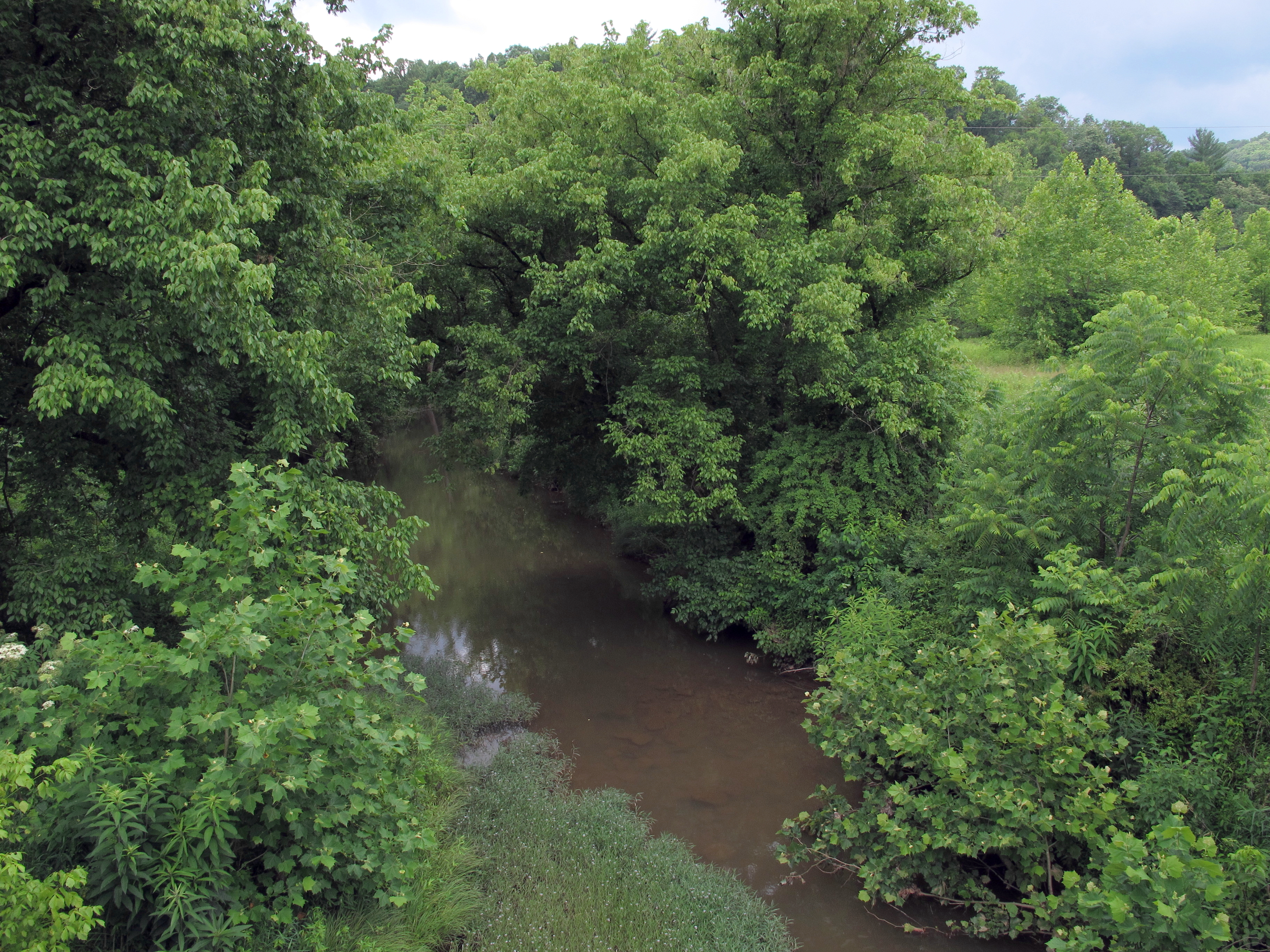
- Sugar Creek in Pleasants County

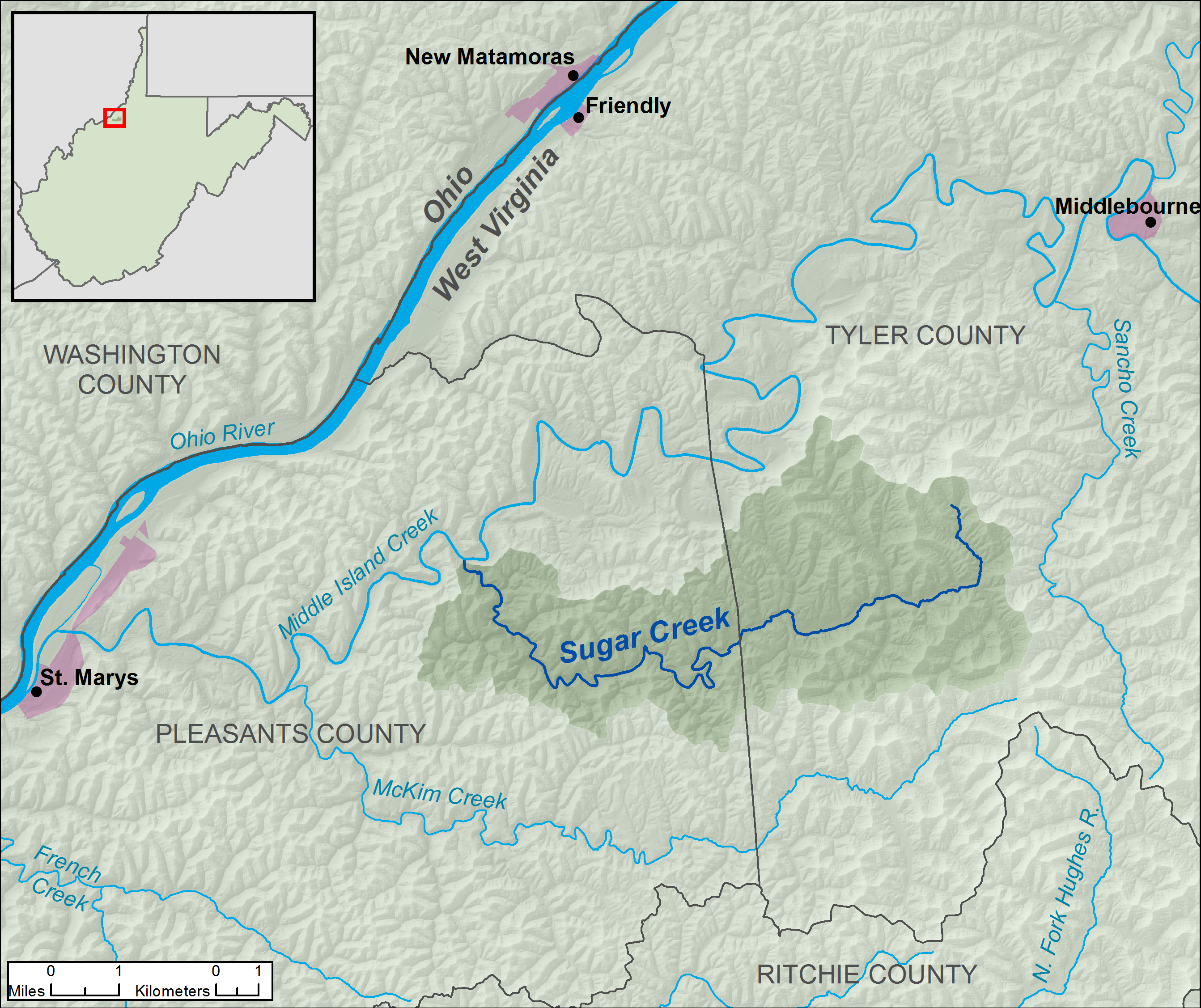
- A map of Sugar Creek and its watershed

Location
- Country: United States
- State: West Virginia
- Counties: Tyler, Pleasants

Physical characteristics
- Source
  - location: near Wick, Tyler County
  - coordinates: 39.4336887°N 80.9578862°W
  - elevation: 931 ft (284 m)
- Mouth: Middle Island Creek
  - location: Sugar Valley, Pleasants County
  - coordinates: 39.4195206°N 81.0906666°W
  - elevation: 614 ft (187 m)
- Length: 15 mi (24 km)
- Basin size: 22.1 sq mi (57 km^{2})

Basin features
- Hydrologic Unit Code: 050302010507 (USGS)

Sugar Creek is a tributary of Middle Island Creek, 15 miles (24 km) long, in northwestern West Virginia in the United States. Via Middle Island Creek and the Ohio River, it is part of the watershed of the Mississippi River, draining an area of 22.1 square miles (57 km^{2}) in a rural region on the unglaciated portion of the Allegheny Plateau.

McKim Creek rises northeast of Wick in southwestern Tyler County and flows generally westward into eastern Pleasants County, through the unincorporated communities of Wick and Meadville in Tyler County and Twiggs in Pleasants County. It flows into Middle Island Creek at the community of Sugar Valley, 10.3 miles (16.6 km) upstream of Middle Island Creek's confluence with the Ohio River in St. Marys.

According to the Geographic Names Information System, Sugar Creek has also been known historically by the name "Owlshead Run."

== See also ==
- List of rivers of West Virginia
