= Twigg =

Twigg is a surname. Notable people with the surname include:

- Derek Twigg (born 1959), British politician
- Gary Twigg (born 1984), Scottish footballer
- Georgie Twigg (born 1990), English field hockey player
- George Twigg III (1932–2017), American politician
- Rebecca Twigg (born 1963), American cyclist
- Stephen Twigg (born 1966), British politician
- Thurston Twigg-Smith (1921–2016), American businessman and philanthropist
- William Twigg-Smith (1883–1950), New Zealand artist

== See also ==
- Twiggs (disambiguation)
- Twig
- Twigge
