= USS Haraden (DD-585) =

Fletcher-class destroyer

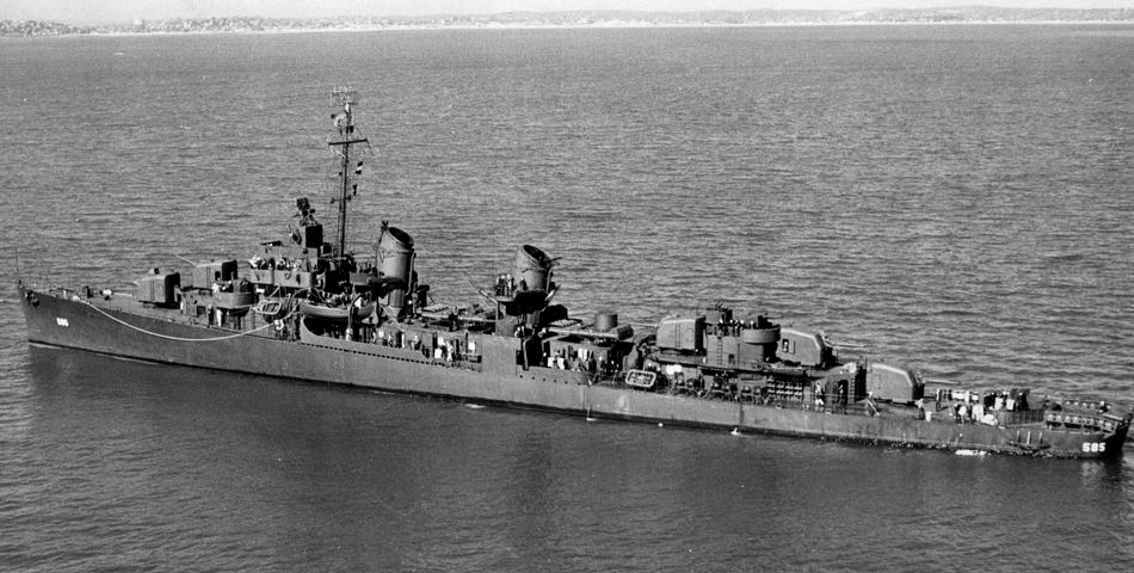
- Haraden in October 1943

History

United States
- Name: USS Haraden
- Namesake: Jonathan Haraden
- Builder: Boston Navy Yard
- Laid down: 9 November 1942
- Launched: 19 March 1943
- Commissioned: 16 September 1943
- Decommissioned: 2 July 1946
- Stricken: 1 November 1972
- Fate: Sunk as a target, November 1973

General characteristics
- Class & type: Fletcher-class destroyer
- Displacement: 2,050 tons
- Length: 376 ft (115 m)
- Beam: 39 ft 8 in (12.09 m)
- Draft: 17 ft 9 in (5.41 m)
- Propulsion: 60,000 shp (45,000 kW); 2 propellers
- Speed: 35 knots (65 km/h; 40 mph)
- Range: 6,500 nautical miles (12,000 km) at 15 knots (28 km/h)
- Complement: 329
- Armament: 5 × 5 in (130 mm), 4 × 40 mm AA guns, 4 × 20 mm AA guns, 10 × 21 inch (533 mm) torpedo tubes, 6 × depth charge projectors, 2 × depth charge tracks

USS Haraden (DD-585), a Fletcher-class destroyer, was the second ship of the United States Navy to be named for Jonathan Haraden (1744–1803), a privateer of the American Revolutionary War.

The second Haraden was launched by Boston Navy Yard, Boston, Massachusetts, 19 March 1943; sponsored by Miss Caroline E. Derby, great-great-grandniece of Captain Jonathan Haraden; and commissioned at Boston 16 September 1943.

== History ==
Haraden departed Boston 9 October 1943 for shakedown training off Bermuda, and after its completion joined the aircraft carrier Intrepid at Boston 30 November for the voyage to the Pacific. She transited the Panama Canal and arrived San Diego 21 December to join Rear Admiral Jesse Oldendorf's Northern Support Group for the invasion of the Marshall Islands.

Escorting the main attack group of transports, Haraden arrived in the Marshalls on 30 January, and was detached to form a screen for the battleships and cruisers during the heavy bombardments of Kwajalein atoll on 31 January. As troops landed under the devastating fire on Ennubir Island, Haraden shifted to direct fire support, turning her guns on an ammunition dump on Ennagannet Island that soon blew up with a tremendous explosion. That night she conducted anti-submarine patrol and 1 February continued fire support and patrol functions during the landings on Roi-Namur. The destroyer departed the Kwajalein area briefly for an escort voyage to the Ellice Islands 6–15 February, but returned to provide anti-submarine patrol for units off Kwajalein and Eniwetok until 29 February.

Haraden arrived Pearl Harbor on 8 March 1944, and after a brief period of upkeep steamed back to the Marshalls with two fleet oilers carrying vital fuel. Arriving on 1 April, she engaged in various duties in support of the operations there, including fire support and anti-submarine patrol, until departing for Pearl Harbor with escort carrier Bataan on 18 May. At Pearl Harbor Haraden was reassigned to escort carriers Natoma Bay and Manila Bay and repair ship Hector for the next major operation in the epic sweep through the Pacific—the Mariana Islands campaign.

Arriving east of Saipan 22 June 1944, Haraden screened her escort carriers during the launching of aircraft 22–24 June; while refueling alongside Natoma Bay she narrowly missed being sunk by four aerial bombs in a surprise attack. Two bombs fell some 200 yards (180 m) to port and two astern. Haraden returned to Pearl Harbor, arriving 8 July. Until 15 September she participated in training exercises and maneuvers in Hawaiian waters in preparation for the invasion of the Philippines.

Haraden arrived Seeadler Harbor, Manus, Admiralty Islands, 2 October 1944, and 12 days later departed as an escort unit for the large group of transports carrying invasion forces. They arrived off Leyte 20 October and Haraden began a long and grueling job of covering the transports during and after the main assault. Japanese airplanes began almost continuous raids on the landing group the afternoon of 20 October, with Haraden acting as part of the antiaircraft screen, protecting the transports with her gunfire.

On the afternoon of 26 October Haraden formed with an escort carrier group in Leyte Gulf and steamed for Manus, arriving at Seeadler Harbor 1 November 1944. Remaining there until 12 November, the ships sailed to Palau, arriving on 18 November, and from there provided air support to convoys bound to and from the Philippines until 28 November. The carrier force, with Haraden in the screen, departed 10 December for the Sulu Sea, en route to the invasion of Mindoro.

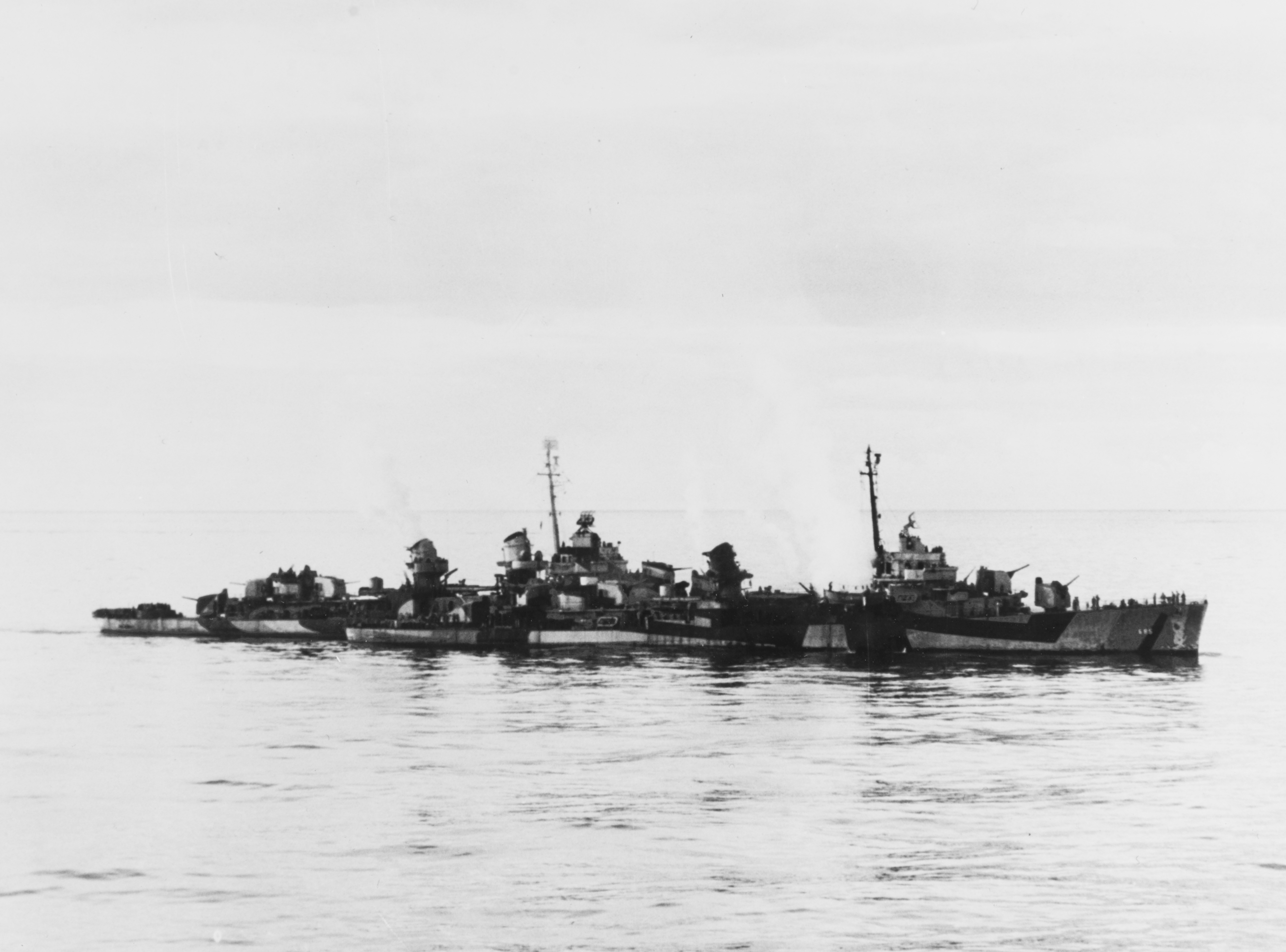
USS Twiggs assists Haraden after being hit by the kamikaze, 13 December 1944.

Haraden and the escort carriers entered the Sulu Sea 13 December, and were attacked that day by four Japanese aircraft. Haraden assisted in downing three of the raiders, but the fourth banked left and dived for the destroyer. Trailing smoke from hits by Haraden's gunners, she crashed into the destroyer's side, putting her forward engine room out of commission and severely damaging her topside. As Haraden lay dead in the water, the destroyer Twiggs came alongside to help and the Haraden was soon underway on her own power. She arrived at San Pedro Bay 14 December 1944 and transferred her casualties—14 killed and 24 wounded. Steaming on toward the United States via Hawaii, she arrived at Puget Sound Navy Yard, Bremerton, Washington on 14 January 1945 for battle repairs.

Repairs and training completed, Haraden departed again for the Pacific 19 April from San Francisco, arriving Pearl Harbor 25 April. She performed escort duties for amphibious convoys in the Western Pacific until 6 July, when she commenced a series of training exercises off Subic Bay, Philippine Islands.

Haraden next participated in the operations off the China coast following the surrender of Japan. She got underway 28 August with units of the 7th Fleet and made a show of force at Tsingtao and along the China coast to help stabilize the tense situation there. She arrived at Jinsen, Korea, 8 September and after another voyage down the coast of China and back, departed Jinsen with the North China occupation forces 29 September. She stood by to support the amphibious landings of occupation forces off Taku Bay 30 September – 6 October, and visited Chefoo, Shanghai, Taku, and Tsingtao in support of the occupation. Underway from Tsingtao 13 December 1945, she steamed by way of Pearl Harbor to San Francisco, arriving 3 January 1946. Later moved to San Diego, she remained inactive until decommissioned there 2 July 1946. Haraden entered the Pacific Reserve Fleet, San Diego Group.

Haraden was stricken from the Naval Vessel Register 1 November 1972. She was sunk as a target November 1973.

Haraden received five battle stars for her service in World War II.
