= USS Twiggs (DD-591) =

Fletcher-class destroyer

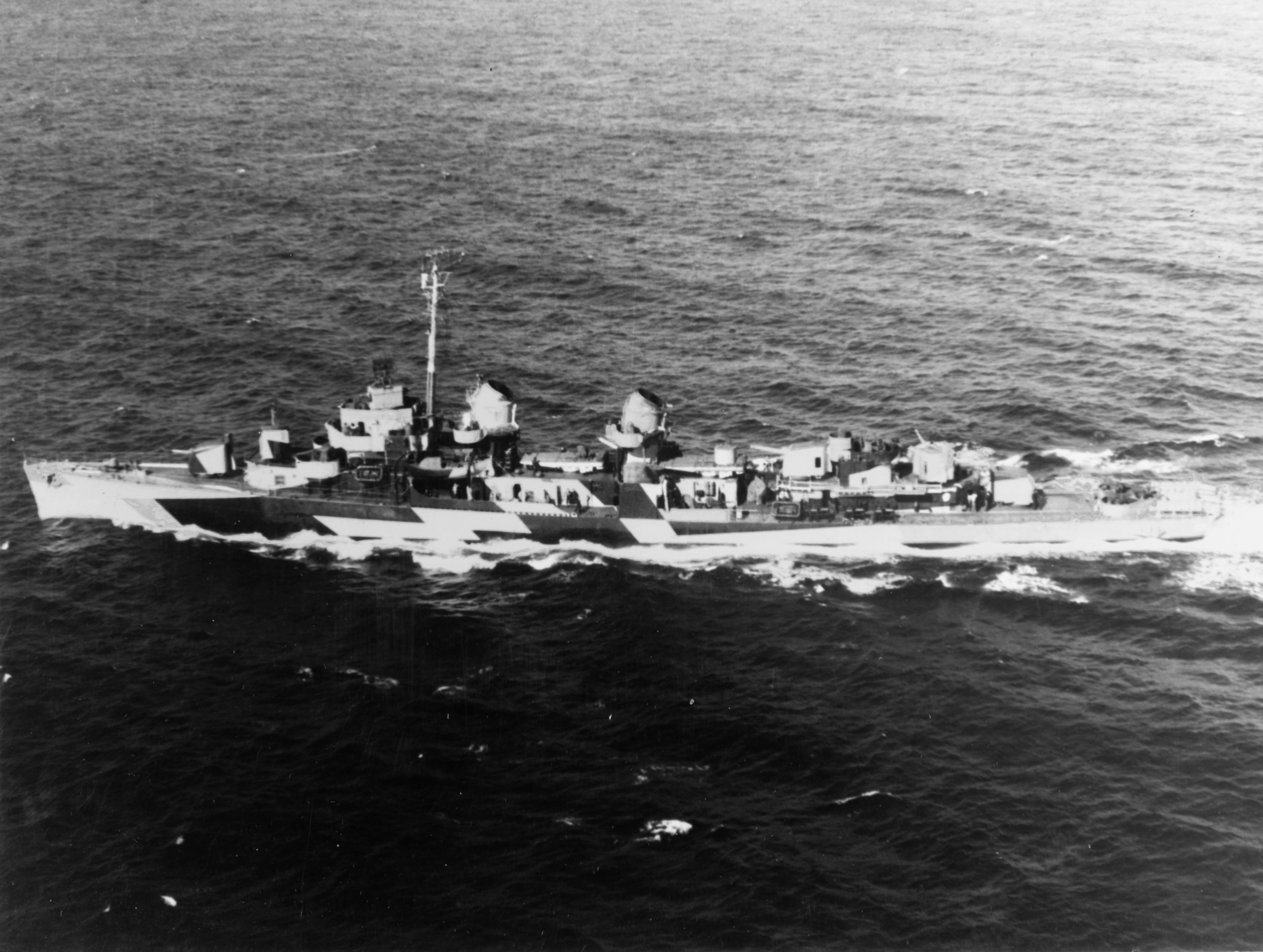
- USS Twiggs (DD-591), in camouflage paint, 23 February 1945.

History

United States
- Name: USS Twiggs
- Namesake: Levi Twiggs
- Builder: Charleston Navy Yard
- Laid down: 20 January 1943
- Launched: 7 April 1943
- Sponsored by: Mrs. Roland S. Morris
- Commissioned: 4 November 1943
- Stricken: 11 July 1945
- Fate: Sunk off Okinawa, 16 June 1945

General characteristics
- Class & type: Fletcher-class destroyer
- Displacement: 2,050 long tons (2,080 t)
- Length: 376 ft 6 in (114.76 m)
- Beam: 39 ft 8 in (12.09 m)
- Draft: 17 ft 9 in (5.41 m)
- Propulsion: 60,000 shp (45,000 kW); 2 propellers
- Speed: 35 knots (65 km/h; 40 mph)
- Range: 6,500 nmi (12,000 km; 7,500 mi) at 15 knots (28 km/h; 17 mph)
- Complement: 273
- Armament: 5 × 5 in (127 mm) guns; 4 × 40 mm AA guns; 4 × 20 mm AA guns; 10 × 21 in (533 mm) torpedo tubes; 6 × depth charge projectors, 2 × depth charge tracks

USS Twiggs (DD-591) was a Fletcher-class destroyer of the United States Navy during World War II. She was the second ship to be named for Major Levi Twiggs (1793–1847) of the United States Marine Corps. Twiggs was laid down on 20 January 1943 at the Charleston Navy Yard and launched on 7 April 1943. The destroyer was commissioned on 4 November 1943. She was sunk on 16 June 1945 by a Japanese kamikaze aircraft near Okinawa.

== Construction and career ==
Twiggs was laid down on 20 January 1943 at the Charleston Navy Yard, in Charleston, South Carolina. The destroyer was launched on 7 April 1943, sponsored by Mrs. Roland S. Morris. The destroyer was commissioned on 4 November 1943. Following a shakedown cruise to Bermuda in December 1943, Twiggs operated out of Norfolk as a training ship until 12 May 1944, when she departed Hampton Roads in company with the aircraft carrier Franklin and the destroyers Cushing, and Richard P. Leary and proceeded, via the Panama Canal and San Diego, to Hawaii for operations in the Pacific Theater of World War II. After arriving at Pearl Harbor on 6 June, Twiggs took part in exercises and drills in Hawaiian waters and escorted convoys operating between Oahu and Eniwetok. Throughout most of July, Twiggs worked out of Eniwetok alternating exercises with escort and radar picket duties. On 19 August, she returned to Pearl Harbor to begin rehearsals for the long-awaited return to the Philippines.

On 15 September, in preparation for the assault on Leyte, Twiggs departed Pearl Harbor as a member of Destroyer Squadron 49 (DesRon 49), screening Task Group 79.2 (TG 79.2), Transport Attack Group "Baker", which steamed via Eniwetok for Manus in the Admiralty Islands. After final preparations for the impending invasion, she departed Seeadler Harbor on 14 October. Arriving off Leyte on 20 October, Twiggs provided antiaircraft protection for the transports during the landings. In the following days of heavy enemy air activity, she continued to support the invasion and, on one occasion, rescued a downed aviator from the escort carrier Petrof Bay. Twiggs departed Leyte on 25 October, steamed via Mios Woendi Island to Manus, and arrived at Seeadler Harbor on 1 November.

Twiggs next rendezvoused with the destroyers Haraden and Halligan for escort duty among the Palau Islands. Stationed east of Mindanao, she protected convoys on the approaches to Leyte. On 10 December, Twiggs left Kossol Roads, between Peleliu and Angaur, with a task force bound for the occupation of Mindoro Island. Luzon was the key to the liberation of the Philippines, and Mindoro was the first step in the assault on Luzon. From 13 through 17 December, Twiggs provided antiaircraft cover for the force as it steamed through Surigao Strait and the Mindoro Sea.

Late in 1944, Japan began organized and concerted use of kamikazes. On 13 December, a Japanese aircraft crashed into Haraden. Twiggs aided the severely damaged destroyer, fighting fires and treating casualties. Twiggs was then detached from the convoy to guide Haraden, which had lost communications and radar in the engagement, until the battered vessel made visual contact with a tow convoy off Silino Island. Twiggs then returned to the Mindanao Sea and resumed her duties with the task unit. US Army Air Force flights out of Leyte augmented escort protection of the convoy. Twiggs retired to the Palaus on 20 December.

Twiggs sortied from Kossol Roads on 1 January 1945 protecting a large task force intended for the invasion of Luzon. In the Sulu and South China Seas, several ships of the convoy were hit by Japanese plane attacks; and, on 4 January 1945, Twiggs rescued 211 survivors of the escort carrier Ommaney Bay, which had been destroyed by fire and explosion following an attack by a Japanese plane. Raids by both torpedo and kamikaze aircraft continued as Twiggs operated northwest of Cape Bolinao in support of the Lingayen assault. After taking on food and ammunition at Mindoro, Twiggs briefly ran an antisubmarine patrol off the entrance of Manganin Bay. Underway on 21 January, she arrived in Ulithi on 25 January for minor repairs and maintenance in preparation for the conquest of the Volcano Islands.

=== Iwo Jima ===
Twiggs joined the Bombardment Group which sortied from Ulithi on 10 February for rehearsals at Loesip Island. On 16 February, the force arrived off Iwo Jima where Twiggs quickly began fire support for pre-assault underwater demolition operations off the eastern beaches. She also conducted screening and harassing activities, firing on Japanese shore units and providing illumination. On 17 February, a kamikaze plane attack on Twiggs resulted in a close call when the aircraft, in an obvious attempt to crash into the destroyer, crossed her fantail before hitting the water off her port beam and sinking without exploding. The destroyer continued activities to support American ground forces during the grueling battle for Iwo Jima. On 10 March, she retired toward the Carolines, arriving at Ulithi two days later for rest and replenishment.

=== Okinawa and sinking ===
On 25 March 1945, as part of Task Force 54 (TF 54), Twiggs arrived off Okinawa to take part in the preinvasion bombardment. In addition to antisubmarine and antiaircraft patrols, she supported ground forces with night harassing fire. Kamikaze aircraft were very active at this time, as the Japanese defended the island. On 28 April, a day of heavy air activity, a kamikaze splashed close to Twiggs while she was on radar picket duty with Task Group 51. Bomb blast and fragmentation from the splashed airplane blew in the hull plating between the main and first platform deck causing structural damage. The underwater hull was pushed in, and the starboard propeller was bent. The repair ship Nestor repaired the damage; and, on 17 May, Twiggs returned to duty with the gunfire and covering forces off Okinawa.

In June, the battle for Okinawa was drawing to its close. Twiggs continued radar picket duties in the western fire support area and supported strikes on Iheya Shima and Iheya-Aguni with pre-landing bombardment and gunfire support. On 16 June, Twiggs was on radar picket duty off Senaga Shima in the western fire support area. At 20:30, a single, low-flying Japanese B6N torpedo bomber dropped a torpedo which struck Twiggs on her port side, exploding her number 2 magazine. The plane then circled back and completed its kamikaze mission by crashing; the explosion enveloped the destroyer in flame and, within an hour she had sunk, leaving only 188 survivors. Twiggs was struck from the Navy list on 11 July 1945; and, in 1957, her hulk was donated to the government of the Ryukyu Islands. Twiggs received four battle stars for World War II service.
