= Antonio León (soldier) =

Mexican general, caudillo, and politician (1794–1847)

Antonio de León y Loyola

Governor of Oaxaca
- In office 29 November 1844 – 2 September 1845
- Preceded by: Luis Fernández del Campo
- Succeeded by: Luis Fernández del Campo
- In office 15 January 1844 – 7 October 1844
- Preceded by: José Domingo Ibáñez de Corbera
- Succeeded by: Luis Fernández del Campo
- In office 18 September 1841 – 15 November 1843
- Preceded by: José López Ortigoza
- Succeeded by: José García Malo
- In office 19 June 1834 – 8 September 1834
- Preceded by: Tiburcio Cañas
- Succeeded by: José López Ortigoza

Deputy to the Constituent Congress
- In office 1824–1824
- Constituency: Oaxaca

Political chief of the Province of Oaxaca
- In office February 1823 – September 1823

Personal details
- Born: 3 June 1794 Huajuapan, Kingdom of Mexico, Viceroyalty of New Spain (now Huajuapan de León, Oaxaca, Mexico)
- Died: 8 September 1847 (aged 53) Molino del Rey, Mexico City, Mexico
- Cause of death: Killed in action

Military service
- Allegiance: Spain; Three Guarantees; Mexico
- Branch/service: Mexican Army
- Years of service: 1811–1847
- Rank: Brigadier general
- Commands: Oaxaca National Guard
- Battles/wars: Mexican War of Independence; Casa Mata Plan Revolution; Anexation of Soconusco; Mexican–American War; Battle of Molino del Rey †

Antonio de la Luz Quirino de León y Loyola (3 June 1794 – 8 September 1847) was a Mexican general, caudillo, and politician from the Mixteca of Oaxaca. After a decade in the royalist army he joined the Plan of Iguala and, in a campaign of about six weeks, forced the surrender of the last Spanish authorities in Oaxaca. Post-independence, he broke with the Mexican Empire and after its collapse, sat in the Constituent Congress of 1824, and became the dominant military politician of Oaxaca in the early republic.

As commander-general and governor of Oaxaca he urged Antonio López de Santa Anna in late 1841 to occupy the disputed district of Soconusco; Mexican troops under Colonel Juan Aguayo entered the district in August 1842 and a presidential decree of 11 September 1842 attached it to Chiapas. While serving as governor of Oaxaca, he brought a young Benito Juárez into politics by appointing him secretary of government. He was killed commanding Oaxacan troops at the Battle of Molino del Rey on 8 September 1847. In January 1848 Juárez, then governor, declared him Benemérito del Estado de Oaxaca. His birthplace was officially renamed as the Heroica Ciudad de Huajuapan de León.

== Early life and royalist service ==
León was born on 3 June 1794 in Huajapan, in the Mixteca region of Oaxaca, the son of Manuel Mariano de León y Marín and María de la Luz Loyola. The family belonged to the regional landed and commercial elite; his grandfather José de León, from Galicia, had settled in the Puebla–Oaxaca borderlands in the eighteenth century. He grew up in Huajolotitlán, near Huajuapan, and received his early education from his uncle, the priest Miguel José de Loyola.

On 10 May 1811, not yet seventeen, he enlisted as alférez in the royalist cavalry regiment of Huajuapan. He was promoted lieutenant on 6 July 1814 and captain on 18 April 1817 after service in escorts, skirmishes and formal actions against the insurgency. In 1820 he served as alcalde primero (municipal president) of Huajuapan; his brother Manuel succeeded him in the office.

== Consummation of independence in Oaxaca ==
In March–April 1821 León and his brother Manuel accepted a commission from Nicolás Bravo to raise the Mixteca for independence.

In mid-June 1821 León proclaimed independence at Tezoatlán. Dates in the local tradition vary between 16 and 19 June; municipal commemorations use 19 June. With a handful of poorly armed men, contemporary accounts speak of about twenty-six, he attacked a larger royalist party and forced its surrender, then defeated Captain José Ortega’s Cazadores de la Reina at Agua Escondida. On 21 June he took Huajuapan; a Guanajuato battalion under Regino Brito joined him there.

He then reduced the remaining royalist posts on the road to the capital: the fort of Yanhuitlán and Etla, where Lieutenant Colonel Manuel Obeso, the Spanish intendancy commander, capitulated on 30 July 1821. León entered the city of Oaxaca on 31 July and proclaimed the independence of the province. Agustín de Iturbide rewarded him with the title Comandante de las Tres Mixtecas and he became military commander of Oaxaca.

== From empire to federal republic ==
When Iturbide dissolved the Constituent Congress on 31 October 1822, León turned against the emperor. Together with Nicolás Bravo he held Oaxaca and, on 1 June 1823, adhered to the federal republic. In 1823 he exercised the offices of jefe político and military commander of the intendancy; a junta declared Oaxaca a free and sovereign state.

He sat as a deputy in the Constituent Congress of 1824. Carlos Sánchez Silva argues that León was the central military-political actor who placed Oaxaca, with Jalisco, Zacatecas and Yucatán, among the provinces that forced a federal republican settlement in 1823–25. After an amnesty in 1826 he remained the strongman of Oaxaca politics into the 1840s, combining command of troops with commercial interests that linked the Mixteca to Tehuantepec, Chiapas and Central America.

== Governor of Oaxaca and Benito Juárez ==
In 1841 León supported the movement that overthrew the centralist government of Anastasio Bustamante and became military and civil chief of Oaxaca. On 17 December 1842 the garrison of Oaxaca, meeting in his house, issued an acta of adhesion to the plans of San Luis Potosí, Huejotzingo and Puebla; he signed as brigadier general, governor and commander-general.

As governor he appointed Benito Juárez secretary of government and, in 1842, civil and revenue judge for the state, Juárez’s first major statewide offices.

== Annexation of Soconusco, 1841–1842 ==
After 1824 the district of Soconusco remained in an imposed “neutrality” between Mexico and the Federal Republic of Central America. In late 1841, as commander-general of Oaxaca, León wrote to President Santa Anna describing the disorder in the district, stressing its wealth and its commercial ties to Tehuantepec, and recommending annexation by force. Mexico had already lost Texas and faced secession in Yucatán; Santa Anna authorized the operation in reserved correspondence and ordered preparations by the commands of Oaxaca and Chiapas.

In August 1842 a force of just over 500 men, styled the División Protectora de los Votos del Soconusco and commanded in the field by Colonel Juan Aguayo, marched from Tonalá through Escuintla, Tapachula and Tuxtla Chico. The occupation was completed without a shot. On 11 September 1842 Santa Anna decreed that the district of Soconusco was “irrevocably united” to the department of Chiapas and therefore to the Mexican nation, and raised Tapachula to the rank of city as district capital.

León did not command the column that entered Tapachula. His role was that of the Oaxaca commander who proposed the occupation, helped prepare it, and received political-military credit. Deputy Manuel Larráinzar of Chiapas was the other principal civilian advocate of the same policy. Guatemalan protests treated the decree as a violation of the 1825 neutrality arrangement.

== Mexican–American War and death ==
During the Mexican–American War León asked for command of the Batallón Activo de Oaxaca, raised men and money from the state and from his own pocket, and joined Santa Anna after the Mexican defeat at Cerro Gordo. The Oaxaca brigade was used to rebuild the army covering the Valley of Mexico. Huajuapan formed a Junta de Auxilios on 8 March 1847 to supply the defenders.

At the Battle of Molino del Rey on 8 September 1847 he commanded in the front line. On the eve of the action he is reported to have called the Batallón Patria to attention and asked those prepared to die with him to step forward. Wounded in the fighting, he was withdrawn by Lieutenant Colonel Miguel María de Echegaray of the 6th Light Infantry. His last words are given as: "Haga lo imposible por nuestra patria, que ella sabrá recompensar sus servicios" (“Do the impossible for our country; she will know how to reward your services”). He died that evening, at about 8 p.m.

== Legacy ==
On 12 January 1848 Governor Benito Juárez issued state decree no. 20 declaring “the citizen general Antonio de León” Benemérito del Estado de Oaxaca. In April 1848 Juárez distributed honor shields to the Oaxaca National Guard that had fought at Molino del Rey under León.

The city of his birth added his surname and is officially the Heroica Ciudad de Huajuapan de León. The town of Moroleón in Guanajuato also took the name. A bronze monument by 1885 stands on the Zócalo of Oaxaca, facing the government palace. Regional historians note that his national reputation was later overshadowed by two other Oaxacans, Juárez and Porfirio Díaz.

== See also ==
- Mexican War of Independence
- Soconusco
- Battle of Molino del Rey
- Benito Juárez
- Huajuapan de León
