= Samuel E. Watson =

Samuel E. Watson (died 17 November 1847) was an officer in the U.S. Marine Corps who led troops during the Mexican–American War.

Watson held a rank of brevet lieutenant colonel in the Marines during the Mexican War. He commanded a Marine battalion that reinforced the army of Winfield Scott shortly before the Battle for Mexico City. (Watson had served under Winfield Scott in 1813 and was a veteran Marine.) Watson and his men were attached to the 4th Division under Brig. Gen. John A. Quitman. During the critical attacks on Chapultepec Castle on September 13, 1847, Watson showed little initiative, and many of his Marines missed the crucial action, waiting in reserve in a defilade for attack orders that never came. Shortly after the fall of Mexico City to the Americans, Watson died of natural causes.
