= Hansford Dade Duncan Twiggs =

American politician and judge from Georgia (1837–1917)

Speaker Pro Tempore of the House of Representatives (Richmond County)
- In office 1880–1881

Judge of the Superior Courts of the Middle District
- In office 1870–1873

Personal details
- Born: March 25, 1837 Barnwell, South Carolina
- Died: March 25, 1917 (aged 80) Savannah, Georgia
- Resting place: Augusta, Georgia
- Party: Democratic
- Spouse(s): Lucie E. Wilkins, Cornelia Dennis Harrison
- Relations: Sarah Lowe Twiggs (sister)
- Children: David Emanuel Twiggs, Joseph Wilkins Twiggs, Herschel Twiggs, and Hattie Twiggs
- Education: Georgia Military Institute, University of Pennsylvania, University of Georgia
- Occupation: Attorney

Hansford Dade Duncan Twiggs (March 25, 1837 – March 25, 1917) was a Georgia attorney, Democratic politician, judge, and Confederate military officer during the American Civil War. He was a great-grandson of American Revolutionary War general John Twiggs. He died in Savannah, Georgia on his 80th birthday and was buried in the Summerville Cemetery in Augusta, Georgia.
