= Twigge =

Twigge is a surname. Notable people with the surname include:

- Jenny Twigge (born 1950), British actress
- William Twigge (1657–1727), Irish priest
