= Twiggs, West Virginia =

Twiggs
- Unincorporated community
- Location within the state of West Virginia Twiggs (the United States)
- Coordinates: 39°23′51″N 81°1′54″W
- Country: United States
- State: West Virginia
- County: Pleasants
- Elevation: 787 ft (240 m)
- Time zone: UTC-5 (Eastern (EST))
  - Summer (DST): UTC-4 (EDT)
- GNIS ID: 1555844

Twiggs is an unincorporated community in Pleasants County, West Virginia, United States, along Sugar Creek.
