= Levi Twiggs =

American military officer (1793–1847)

- Born: May 21, 1793; Richmond County, Georgia, U.S.
- Died: September 13, 1847 (aged 54); Mexico City, Mexico
- Burial place: Laurel Hill Cemetery, Philadelphia, Pennsylvania, U.S.
- Relatives: John Twiggs (father); David E. Twiggs (brother)
- Military career
- Allegiance: United States
- Branch: United States Marine Corps
- Commands: Philadelphia Navy Yard; First Battalion
- Conflicts: War of 1812; American Indian Wars; Second Seminole War; Mexican-American War; Battle of Chapultepec

Levi Twiggs (May 21, 1793 – September 13, 1847) was an American military officer who served in the United States Marine Corps during the War of 1812, the Second Seminole War, and the Mexican–American War. He was killed by enemy fire while leading an attack during the Battle of Chapultepec.

== Early life ==
Twiggs was born in Richmond County, Georgia, on May 23, 1793. His father was a leader in the Georgia militia during the American Revolutionary War.

== Career ==
He joined the United States Marine Corps and was commissioned a second lieutenant on November 10, 1813. He was promoted to first lieutenant in 1815. During the War of 1812, he saw action on board President and was captured when that frigate was taken by a squadron of four British warships. After being imprisoned at Bermuda, he was freed when word of the Treaty of Ghent reached that island. He served at the New York and Philadelphia stations. In 1824, he was assigned to the USS Constellation under Commodore Lewis Warrington and served for two years in the West Indies Squadron. He was promoted to captain in 1830.

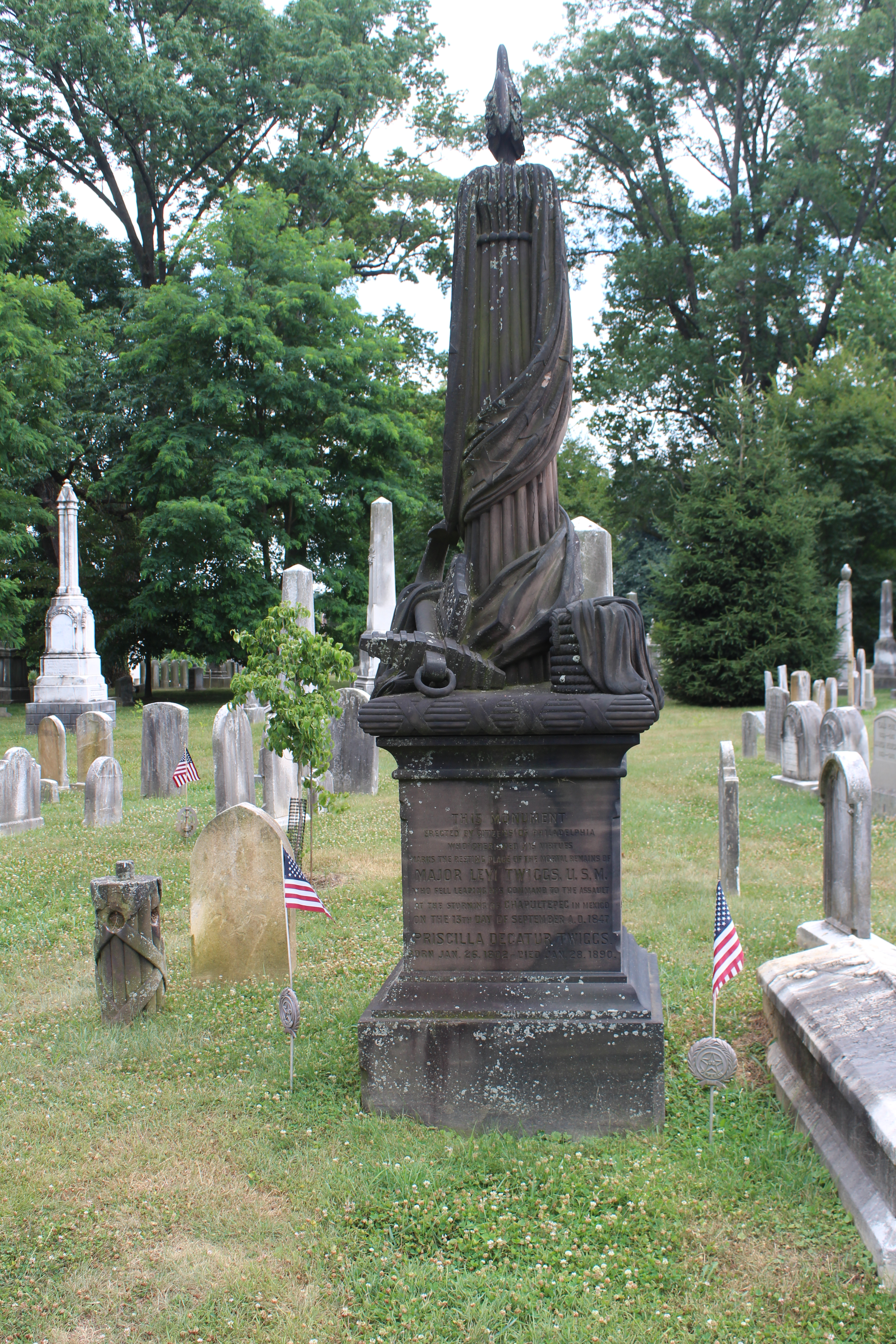
Levi Twiggs memorial in Laurel Hill Cemetery

He fought in the Seminole Wars in Florida and Georgia in 1836 and 1837, and achieved the rank of major in November 1840. In 1843, Twiggs was assigned command of the Philadelphia Navy Yard. At the start of the Mexican-American War, Twiggs requested an active part in the fighting and was attached to the Marine Battalion which left New York in June 1847. He commanded the First Battalion under Lieutenant Colonel Samuel E. Watson. He died due to enemy fire as he led a 40 marine "storming party" in the Battle of Chapultepec on September 13, 1847, and was interred at Laurel Hill Cemetery in Philadelphia.

== Personal life ==
He married Priscilla Decatur McKnight, the granddaughter of Stephen Decatur, on November 12, 1822, in Brooklyn, New York. Together they had one son and three daughters that lived to adulthood. Their son, George Decatur Twiggs, was also killed while serving in the Mexican-American War.

== Legacy ==
The USS Twiggs (DD-127) and USS Twiggs (DD-591) were named in his honor.
