= David E. Twiggs =

American military officer and Confederate States Army general (1790–1862)

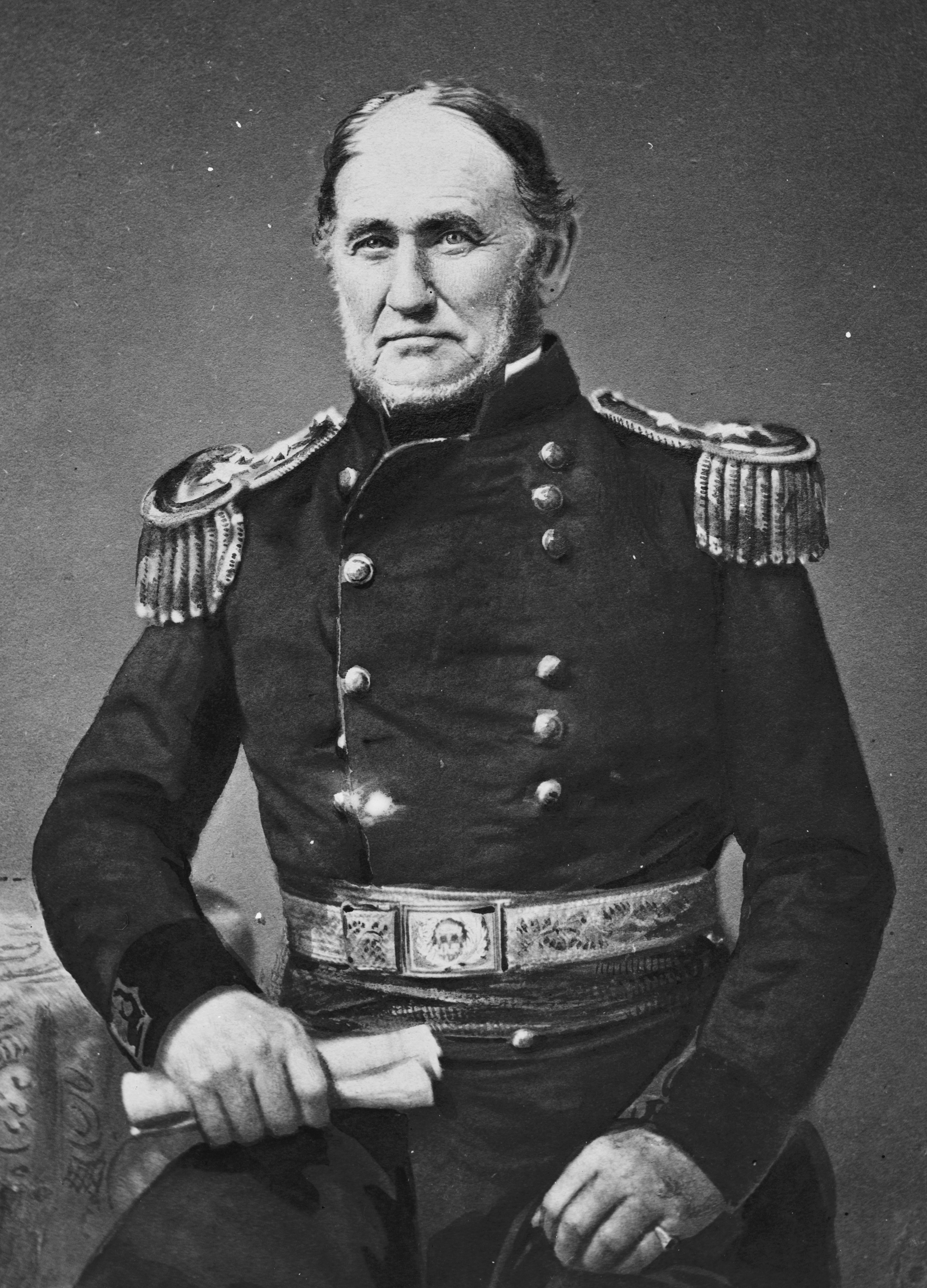
- Born: February 14, 1790; Richmond County, Georgia, U.S.
- Died: July 15, 1862 (aged 72); Augusta, Georgia, C.S.
- Burial place: Twiggs Cemetery; Augusta, Georgia
- Relatives: Levi Twiggs (brother); Abraham C. Myers (son-in-law); John Twiggs Myers (grandson); Sarah Lowe Twiggs (great-niece)
- Military career
- Allegiance: United States; Confederate States
- Branch: United States Army; Confederate States Army
- Service years: 1812–1861 (USA); 1861 (CSA)
- Rank: Brevet Major General (USA); Major General (CSA)
- Nickname: "Bengal Tiger"
- Commands: Department of the West
- Conflicts: War of 1812; Black Hawk War; Second Seminole War; Mexican–American War: Battle of Palo Alto; Battle of Resaca de la Palma; Battle of Monterrey; Siege of Veracruz; Battle of Cerro Gordo; Battle of Contreras; Battle of Churubusco; Battle of Chapultepec; American Civil War

David Emanuel Twiggs (February 14, 1790 – July 15, 1862) was an American military officer who served during the War of 1812, the Black Hawk War, and Mexican–American War.

As commander of the U.S. Army's Department of Texas when the American Civil War broke out, he surrendered his entire command to the Confederates, with facilities, armaments, and other supplies valued at $1.3 million. Dismissed from the U.S. Army as a traitor, he was commissioned as a general of the Confederate States Army in 1861. But, recognizing he was in poor health, he quickly resigned from his commission later that year. He was the oldest Confederate general to serve in the Civil War.

== Early life ==
Twiggs was born in 1790 on the "Good Hope" plantation in Richmond County, Georgia, son of John Twiggs and his wife, Ruth Emanuel. A general in the Georgia militia during the American Revolutionary War, the senior Twiggs was the namesake for Twiggs County, Georgia. He was the nephew, through his mother, of David Emanuel, Governor of Georgia.

== Early military career ==
Twiggs volunteered for service as a captain during the War of 1812 and made a career in the military.

In 1816, Twiggs was ordered by Major General Edmund P. Gaines to set out from Fort Montgomery and establish a new fort on the border of the Alabama Territory and Spanish West Florida. This new fort was known as Fort Crawford. After serving at Fort Crawford, Twiggs became commandant of Fort Scott.

In 1828, he was sent to Wisconsin to establish a fort at the portage between the Fox and Wisconsin rivers. With three companies of the First Infantry, his forces built Fort Winnebago around what has come to be known as Fort Winnebago Surgeon's Quarters at Portage, Wisconsin. This was a base of operation during the Black Hawk War.

Twiggs was commissioned as Colonel of the 2nd U.S. Dragoons in 1836 and served in the Seminole Wars in Florida, where he earned the nickname "Bengal Tiger" for his fierce temper. He also decided to act offensively against the Seminole rather than wait for them to strike first. Some of the Seminole moved deep into the Everglades, evading U.S. forces. They never surrendered, and the U.S. government finally gave up on hopes of removing them to Indian Territory.

== Mexican–American War ==
During the Mexican–American War (1846–1848), Twiggs led a brigade in the Army of Occupation at the battles of Palo Alto and Resaca de la Palma. He was promoted to brigadier general in 1846 and commanded a division at the Battle of Monterrey. He joined Winfield Scott's expedition, commanding its 2nd Division of Regulars. He led the division in all the battles from Veracruz through Mexico City. He was wounded during the assault on Chapultepec. After the fall of Mexico City, he was appointed military governor of Veracruz. Brigadier General Twiggs was awarded a ceremonial sword by the Congress on March 2, 1849. He was an original member of the Aztec Club of 1847, a military society of officers who had served in the Mexican War.

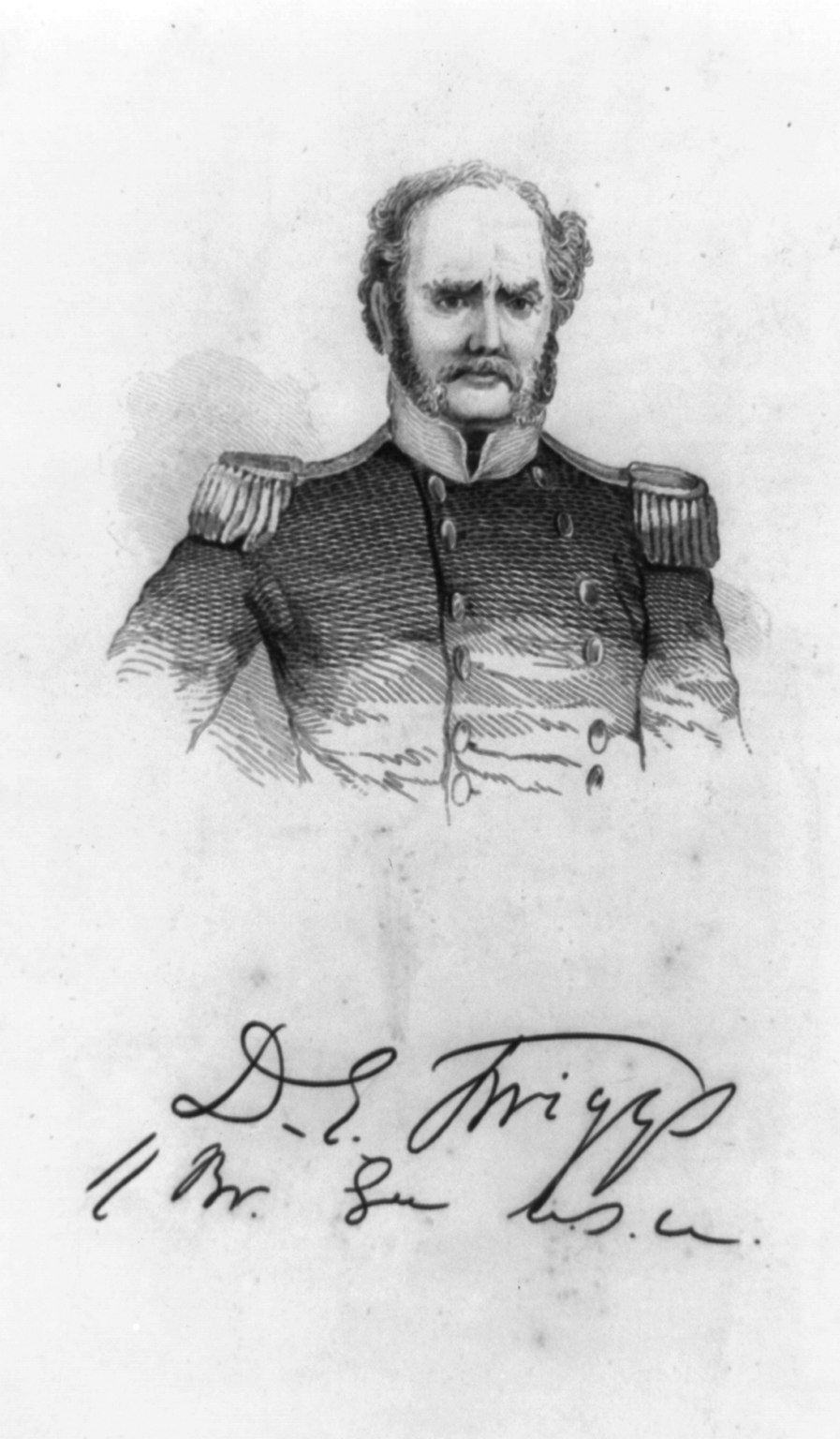
David Emanuel Twiggs, 1850

== Commander of the Department of Texas ==
After the Mexican–American War, Twiggs was appointed brevet major general and commanded the U.S. Army's Department of Texas. He was in this command when the American Civil War broke out. He was one of five general officers in the U.S. Army in 1861, along with Winfield Scott, John Wool, Joseph E. Johnston, and William Harney. As there was then no mandatory retirement, all but Johnston were over the age of 60, with three (Scott, Twiggs, and Wool) having served in the War of 1812 half a century earlier.

Twiggs's command included about 20% of the U.S. Army guarding the Mexican border. As states began to declare secession, on February 4, 1861, he met with a trio of Confederate commissioners in San Antonio, including Philip N. Luckett and Samuel A. Maverick. Twiggs was loath to fire on American citizens and had previously asked Washington for instructions, stating that in the absence of explicit orders would turn over the army property in his command to the state of Texas if secession occurred. Despite being relieved of command by an order received from the War Department on February 15, surrounded by Confederate forces, he surrendered his entire command — all the federal installations, property, and soldiers in Texas, on the following day. This included 20 military installations (including the U.S. Arsenal at the Alamo), 44 cannons, 400 pistols, 1,900 muskets, 500 wagons, and 950 horses, valued at $1.3 million. He insisted that all U.S. soldiers be allowed to retain personal arms, sidearms, flags and standards. The 160 U.S. soldiers in San Antonio and soldiers in other Texas garrisons were allowed to march from Texas by way of the coast.

== Confederate service ==
Twiggs was dismissed from the U.S. Army on March 1, 1861, for "treachery to the flag of his country." He accepted a commission as a major general from the Confederate States Army on May 22, 1861. He was assigned to command the Confederate Department of Louisiana (comprising that state along with the southern half of Mississippi and Alabama), but he was past the age of 70 and in poor health. He resigned from his commission before he could assume any active duty. Mansfield Lovell succeeded him in the command of New Orleans. Twiggs retired on October 11, 1861.

== Death and burial ==
Twiggs died of pneumonia in Augusta, Georgia, on July 15, 1862. He is buried in Twiggs Cemetery, also known as the Family Burying Ground, on Good Hope Plantation in Richmond County, Georgia.

== See also ==
- List of American Civil War generals (Confederate)
