= John Twiggs =

American militia officer and politician (1750–1816)

General John Twiggs (June 5, 1750 – March 29, 1816) served as a leader in the Georgia Militia during the American Revolutionary War. Twiggs County, Georgia was named after him.

== Biography ==
Twiggs was born in Maryland in 1750, and his family moved to St. George's Parish in Georgia in 1751. His parents' names are unknown. Biographical sketches placed him in Georgia in the 1760s accompanying the family of David Emanuel Sr., who had migrated from Maryland, Pennsylvania, or Virginia to St. George's Parish (later Burke County). He married Ruth Emanuel, the sister of David Emanuel, who served under Twiggs in his unit and later became Governor of Georgia. Twiggs had six children, with the most notable being American Civil War General David E. Twiggs. Another son was USMC Major Levi Twiggs.

Twiggs served as a lieutenant in a militia company raised in St. Paul's Parish (current-day Richmond County, Georgia), and he was promoted to captain on June 3, 1774. He led a company that was commanded by Colonel Samuel Jack during the Revolution. Twiggs was later promoted to colonel, then brigadier general (August 18, 1781), and finally major general (September 8, 1791). John Twiggs led Georgia forces against both the British and the Cherokee in the backcountry. He spent all of 1782 helping to drive the British out of Georgia and quell their Creek allies. As a result of his efforts during this period, Twiggs became known as the "Savior of Georgia." He was wounded in a battle in Camden, South Carolina; however, he continued to serve in the military after the Revolution. After the war, he remained active on a variety of political and military fronts, statewide and in and around Augusta, including involvement in the Yazoo land fraud.

In 1783 Twiggs continued his public service with an appointment as a state Indian commissioner and concluded land cession treaties with the Creeks. He was promoted to major general of militia in 1792 and conducted an expedition against the Creeks in 1793, and led the troops that compelled the abandonment of Elijah Clarke's Trans-Oconee Republic rebellion in 1794. He was involved in the suppression of a suspected slave revolt in 1810.

Twiggs participated in the commission that selected the site for the University of Georgia in Athens, served as a trustee to that institution, and contributed money for the building of the initial UGA Chapel on its campus. He was also appointed Justice of the Peace for Burke County, Georgia in 1782 and served as a state Senator from Richmond County in 1791.

Through a series of land purchases partly comprised confiscated Tory land that was awarded to him, Twiggs built Good Hope Plantation, which stretched over 1,500 acres throughout Richmond County and into Aiken County, South Carolina. A tobacco farmer, he left seven slaves to his wife when he died. He died at his plantation in 1816 and was buried there.
