= Stockton Center for International Law =

Research center at the Naval War College

The Stockton Center for International Law is an American research center at the Center for Naval Warfare Studies at the Naval War College. The center is focused on original research and analysis in international law and military operations. Predominantly, the Stockton Center has been involved in the review of various military manuals under international law, including the Tallinn Manual 2.0, the San Remo Manual and the Woomera Manual. Additionally, the center is responsible for the International Law Studies Journal, the editor-in-chief of which is the current Charles H. Stockton Professor of International Law, Professor James Kraska. The center routinely organizes workshops and seminars on contemporary issues in international law.

== History ==
=== International Law at the Naval War College ===
The study of international law has historically been crucial to the courses and instruction at the Naval War College, and has proved indispensable in complementing the institution's focus on military operations and international relations. Initially, the Naval War College focused on four primary areas relating to international law. First, the college prioritizes the instruction of resident students in international law through seminars, research work and discussion of case studies. Secondly, the college has been closely involved with the “Blue Book Series of International Law Situations and Notes” which was first published in 1894. The Naval War College has collaborated in the publication of 32 out of the first 54 volumes of the series, on topics varying from “Collective Security under International Law” to “The Law of War and Neutrality at Sea”. Third, the college also provided correspondence courses in international law aimed at the graduate level, which focused on international relations, the laws of peace and the laws of war, and the functioning of international organizations. Finally, the Naval War College has been extensively involved with the Navy Department in the drafting and reviewing of manuals and publications which provide guidance with regard to warfare at sea. Charles H. Stockton, who was the president of the Naval War College at the time, prepared the first set of manuals on naval warfare titled ‘U.S. Naval War Code 1900’.

=== Charles H. Stockton and the Naval War College ===
In July 1951 the Naval War College had its first full-time civilian appointment, which was for a professor of international law. On 6 October 1967 the position was formally named the ‘Charles H. Stockton Chair of International Law’, after the notable naval officer and academician, Charles Stockton.

Charles Stockton joined the Navy during the Civil War, and was inducted in the Naval Academy class of 1865 where he was awarded the Civil War medal. During his time in the Navy, Stockton observed multiple instances which demonstrated the significance of international law in naval operations, and the urgent need for naval officers to undertake a study of the practical applications of international law. In the late 1980s, support for the Naval War College as an educational institution declined, given its heavy focus on history, theory and case studies. It was around this time that the Congress authorized the construction of the new building of the college at Coaster's Harbor Island, which occurred under the supervision of Charles Stockton. Stockton recognized the importance and practical utility of international law to the day-to-day operations of the Navy, in addition to subjects such as naval history, strategy and tactics. Under Stockton, the international law course focused primarily on case studies and hypothetical situations that a naval officer may encounter, and considered not only the legal but also the political and ethical considerations of the various approaches to such situations. These situations that Stockton created and published eventually transformed into the Blue Book Series.

== Organization ==
=== Charles H. Stockton Professor of International Law ===
In 1967, the position of the chair of international law at the Naval War College was officially denominated as the Charles H. Stockton Professor of International Law. The Stockton Chair reports to the dean of the Center for Naval Warfare Studies. The rationale of the position is to emphasize the importance of international law in the education of naval officers. The Chairholder is often a recognized authority on areas including the historical development of international law, law of the sea and law of armed conflict, among others.

=== Howard S. Levie Professor ===
The Professor Howard S. Levie Military Chair of Operational Law was established by the president of the Naval War College in 1994 to commemorate Professor Levie's contribution to the college. Professor Levie is one of the world's foremost authorities on international law and armed conflict, having published various treatises on the law of war including Terrorism in War: The Law of War Crimes, Prisoners of War in International Armed Conflict, and The Code International Armed Conflict.

== Programs and courses ==
=== Elective programs ===
- LAW OF ARMED CONFLICT: This includes the study of the development and sources of the law of armed conflict, the application of targeting in respect of the means and methods of warfare, as well as rules of engagement and command responsibility
- LAW OF THE SEA AND LAW OF NAVAL WARFARE: This elective includes the study of maritime security both during peacetime and during armed conflict, along with a focus on certain specific regions such as the Arctic region and the South China Sea.
- THE INTERNATIONAL LAW OF AIRSPACE, OUTER SPACE, AND CYBER OPERATIONS: This elective focuses on military operations in airspace, outer-space and cyberspace, and also includes the consideration of intersectional questions of human rights and humanitarian law.

=== Stockton Center Visiting Research Scholar Program ===
The Visiting Research Scholar Program at the Stockton Center hosts established professionals and scholars of international law as well as exceptional emerging scholars for a period of two to three months. The purpose of the program is to expand and diversify the knowledge and perspectives shared at the Naval War College.

== Publications ==
- Maritime Interdiction of North Korean Ships under UN Sanctions, 37 Berkeley Journal of International Law 369 (2019)
- An Archival History of the Creation and Early Implementation of the Freedom of Navigation Program, in Cooperation and Engagement in the South China Sea and Asia Pacific Region (Myron H. Nordquist ed., 2019)
- Classification of Cyber Capabilities and Operations as Weapons, Means, or Methods of Warfare, 95 International Law Studies 179–225 (2019) (with Michael N. Schmitt)
- Uncertainty in the Law of Targeting: Towards a Cognitive Framework, 10 Harvard National Security Journal 148–194 (2019) (co-author)
- U.S. Employment of Marine Unmanned Vehicles in the South China Sea, the South China Sea: From a Regional Maritime Dispute to Geostrategic Competition (Routledge 2019)
- Advancing the Law of Vessel Interference by Non-State Actors, 55 Texas International Law Journal 159 (2019)
- Models for Maritime Collaboration in the South China Sea: National-Level Coordination, in Cooperation and Engagement in the South China Sea and Asia Pacific Region (Myron H. Nordquist ed., 2019)
- Collateral Damage and the Enemy, British Yearbook of International Law (Apr. 9, 2019) (co-author)
- Air Power, International Law and Ethics, in Routledge Handbook of Air Power (John Andreas Olsen ed., 2019)
- The Law of War: A Detailed Assessment of the U.S. Department of Defense Law of War Manual, 72(1) Naval War College Review 168–70 (2019)
- Outsourcing of Governmental Functions in Contemporary Conflict: Rethinking the Issue of Attribution, 59 Virginia Journal of International Law 47 (2019)
- Reviewing Law of Armed Conflict at Sea and Warfare in New Domains and New Measures: Submarine Cables, Merchant Missile Ships, and Unmanned Marine Systems, 44 Tulane Maritime Law Journal 107 (2019)
