= James Kraska =

American legal scholar

James Kraska is an internationally acclaimed American scholar and a distinguished professor of public international maritime law specializing in the international law of the sea and the law of maritime operations, and naval warfare. He is the current Chairman and Charles H. Stockton Professor of International Maritime Law at Stockton Center for International Law, United States Naval War College. He is also a Visiting Professor of Law and John Harvey Gregory Lecturer on World Organization at Harvard Law School.

== Education ==
Kraska earned a Bachelor of Arts from Mississippi State University and thereafter, a Master of Arts in International Studies from Claremont Graduate University. He received a Doctorate of Jurisprudence (J.D.) from Indiana University Maurer School of Law, and a Master of Laws (L.L.M) and Doctor of Juridical Science (S.J.D) from University of Virginia School of Law.

== Career ==
=== U.S. Navy and the U.S. Government ===
Kraska was commissioned as a U.S. Navy officer and judge advocate in 1990. He served on active duty as a Navy judge advocate in Yokosuka and Okinawa, Japan, as legal adviser to task forces under the Commander, United States Indo-Pacific Command, and in The Pentagon. While in the Pentagon, he was an attorney-adviser for the Deputy Assistant Judge Advocate General for International and Operational Law, the Deputy Legal Adviser to the Deputy Chief of Naval Operations for Plans, Policy, and Operations (N3/N5), and as Oceans Law and Policy Adviser to the Director of Strategic Plans and Policy (J-5) on the Joint Staff. He also served as the Director of the International Negotiations Division at the Pentagon for the J-5, leading a division that provides military advice on bilateral and multilateral agreements and instruments, including conventional and nuclear arms control, and has been a criminal trial litigator, U.S. Naval Legal Service Office, Yokosuka, Japan. Kraska is also a representative for the United States to the International Group of Experts for the San Remo Manual on International Law Applicable to Armed Conflicts at Sea. Additionally, he is a Permanent Member of the Council on Foreign Relations.

=== Academia ===
Kraska served as a military professor of international law and Howard S. Levie Chair in the Law of Armed Conflict at the US Naval War College. He then was a Mary Derrickson McCurdy Visiting Scholar at Duke University Marine Laboratory in the Nicholas School of the Environment, where he conducted research on oceans law and policy. He was also a Visiting Professor of Law at the University of the Philippines College of Law and an Honorary Visiting Professor of Law at Gujarat National Law University. In 2014, he returned to the US Naval War College as a Full Professor in the Stockton Center for International Law. The Stockton Center is a research institute with civilian and military professors of international law focusing on the intersection of international law and military operations. In 2017, he became Chair of Stockton Center, an academic department within the Center for Naval Warfare Studies at the US Naval War College. In 2018, he was selected as the Charles H. Stockton Professor of International Law.

Since 2017, Professor Kraska has taught the course International Law of the Sea at Harvard Law School, where he served in appointments as a Visiting Professor of Law and John Harvey Gregory Lecturer on World Organization. He has also taught executive courses at The Hague Academy of International Law, the Rhodes Academy of Oceans Law and Policy, and the Yeosu Academy of the Law of the Sea.

== Editorial work ==
Kraska has served as the Editor-in-Chief of the journal International Law Studies published by the Naval War College, which is one of the oldest journals of international law in the United States. He is also Editor-in-Chief of three volumes of Benedict on Admiralty: International Maritime Law. He serves on numerous editorial boards, including the International Journal of Marine and Coastal Law, the Journal of the Royal United Services Institute, Texas National Security Review, the Naval War College Review, Asia-Pacific Journal of Ocean Law Policy, and Marine Policy.

== Scholarship ==
Kraska has authored multiple books and journal articles and is internationally known for his work on the progressive development of the law of the sea and the intersection of the law of the sea and maritime power. He is known for his 2010 paper titled “How the United States Lost the Naval War of 2015” which foretold the emergence of the Chinese Navy as a threat to the U.S. strategic position in the Indo-Pacific region, and “Putting Your Head in the Tiger’s Mouth,” concerning the law of submarine espionage.

His work has appeared in the American Journal of International Law, The Yale Journal of International Law, the Columbia Journal of Transnational Law, and the Virginia Journal of International Law. In 2019, he wrote, “Maritime Enforcement of North Korean Sanctions” in the Berkeley Journal of International Law.

== Publications ==
Kraska has written or co-authored more than a hundred publications on a wide range of international legal topics, with a focus on maritime law. His books include:

- Benedict on Admiralty: International Maritime Law (Editor-in-Chief, 3 vols., Lexis-Nexis 2019)
- The Free Sea: The American Fight for Freedom of Navigation (USNI 2018)
- Ocean Law and Policy: Twenty Years of Development Under the UNCLOS Regime (Brill 2016)
- Science, Technology, and New Challenges to Ocean Law (Brill 2015)
- International Maritime Security Law (Brill 2013)
- Arctic Security in an Age of Climate Change (CUP 2013)
- Contemporary Maritime Piracy: International Law, Strategy, and Diplomacy at Sea (Praeger Security International 2011)
- United Nations Convention on the Law of the Sea: Supplement to the Commentary (editor with Myron Nordquist and Satya Nandan) (Martinus Nijhoff 2011)
- United Nations Convention on the Law of the Sea: A Commentary Vol. 7 (editor with Myron Nordquist and Satya Nandan) (Martinus Nijhoff 2011)
- Maritime Power and Law of the Sea (OUP 2010), which won the Alfred Thayer Mahan Award for Literary Achievement
