= E. B. Potter =

American historian (1908–1997)

Elmer Belmont "Ned" Potter (27 December 1908 – 22 November 1997) was an American historian and writer.

Potter was the leading naval historian at the United States Naval Academy from the late 1940s to the mid-1970s. He was editor of the Naval Academy's textbook on naval history, Sea Power: A Naval History, in collaboration with Fleet Admiral Chester W. Nimitz.

== Career ==
Born in Norfolk, Virginia to Judson Rice Potter, a grocer, and Fannie (née Beacham) Potter, he attended the University of Richmond, where he completed his B.A. degree in 1929. Known as "Ned" among family and friends, Potter taught history in high schools between 1931–41, before completing his Master of Arts degree in history at the University of Chicago in 1940.

In 1941, Potter joined the U.S. Naval Reserve and was assigned to the United States Naval Academy at Annapolis, Maryland, where he began to teach history. With the exception of three years service in the Pacific theater in 1943–45, Potter spent his entire career at the Naval Academy until he retired in 1977.

While at the Naval Academy he married Grace Brauer (8 August 1925 – 25 February 1997), on 21 May 1954, with whom he had two daughters: Katherine Anne and Lorraine Frances.

Potter lectured widely on naval history and was a member of the U.S. Naval Institute, the American Historical Association, and the American Association of University Professors.

Potter died of congestive heart failure in Annapolis, Maryland.

== Awards ==
- 1977: Author Award of Merit, U.S. Naval Institute, for Nimitz
- 1977: Alfred Thayer Mahan Award for Literary Achievement, Navy League of the United States

== Published works ==
- American Sea Power Since 1775, Allan Ferguson Westcott, ed. Lippincott, 1947.
- The United States and World Sea Power, by Henry H. Adams [and others] E.B. Potter, editor; J.R. Fredland, assistant editor. Englewood Cliffs, N.J.: Prentice-Hall, 1955.
- Sea Power: A Naval History, Associate editor: Chester W. Nimitz; assistant editors: J.R. Fredland [and] Henry H. Adams. Authors: Henry H. Adams [and others]. Englewood Cliffs, N.J.: Prentice-Hall, 1960. 2nd ed. 1981, ISBN 0870216074.
- The Great Sea War: The Story of Naval Action in World War II, edited by E.B. Potter and Chester W. Nimitz. Englewood Cliffs, N.J.: Prentice-Hall, 1960; New York : Bramhall House, 1960.
- Triumph in the Pacific: The Navy's Struggle Against Japan, edited by E.B. Potter and Chester W. Nimitz. Spectrum book, S-66. Englewood Cliffs, N.J.: Prentice-Hall, 1963.
- The Naval Academy Illustrated History of the United States Navy, New York: Crowell, 1971; New York, Galahad Books, [1971].
- Seemacht: Eine Seekriegsgeschichte von der Antike bis zur Gegenwart, von Elmar [sic] B. Potter und Chester W. Nimitz; Deutsche Fassung hrsg. im Auftrag des Arbeitskreises für Wehrforschung von Jürgen Rohwer. München: Bernard & Graefe, 1974. (The most important of the several translations of Sea Power, this edition is greatly expanded and extensively corrected).
- Nimitz, Naval Institute Press, 1976; 2008.
- Bull Halsey, Annapolis: Naval Institute Press, 1985; 2003.
- Admiral Arleigh Burke, New York: Random House, 1990; 2004.
