= Lucky Bag =

Yearbook of the United States Naval Academy

1894 Naval Academy Lucky Bag

The Lucky Bag is the term for the United States Naval Academy yearbook dedicated to the graduating classes. A traditional Lucky Bag has a collection of photos taken around the academy and photographs of each graduating officer along with a single paragraph describing the individual written by a friend. While no one knows for sure, it is speculated that it is named after the "lucky bag" that contains the possessions of sailors who lost items at sea.

Each year, every midshipman and graduating officer receives a Lucky Bag and every edition of the Lucky Bag is archived by both the Naval Academy and the United States Naval Academy Alumni Association. Lucky Bag digital copies (1894 - 1974) are shared on Nimitz Library Collections.

== History ==
Every man-of-war, you know, has her Lucky Bag, containing a little of every thing, and something belonging to every body.

For variety of contents, a regular Lucky Bag may vie with the caldron that witches boil and bubble “at the pit of Acheron.”

horse of middy and waister’s sock,
dresses of a cat mouse game
Purser’s slops and topman’s hat,
Boatswain’s call and colt and cat,
Belt that on the berth-deck lay,
In the Lucky Bag find their way;
Gaiter, stock and red pompoon,
Sailor’s pan, his pot and spoon,
Shirt of cook and trowser’s duck,
Kid and can and “doctor’s truck,”
And all that’s lost, and found on board,
In the Lucky Bag is always stored.''

“This bag,” Mr. Editor, which I am about to overhaul, has been open for fifteen or twenty years. The facts collected about the Navy during that time — hints dropped by messmates — opinions, notions, &c., have, been picked up and carefully preserved in this “bag.” Before I proceed though, to arrange from this medley of the “bit o’ writin” for you, mm, I must in good earnest bespeak the indulgence of your readers, and seriously invite their attention to the facts which go to show a link to 10 pages,

Matthew Fontaine Maury, USN, used the term "Lucky Bag", and defined it, long before the United States Naval Academy was created. Matthew Maury wrote many articles about the "Lucky Bag" and called the articles, "Scraps From The Lucky Bag". It was information on Naval reform in all its venues and more. This is well known by serious historians. The use of term goes back further than 1820 in the United States Navy and back to the British Navy. Read the link to see a typical "Lucky Bag Scrap" on US Naval Reform. The United States Naval Academy, to a huge extent, was created due to Matthew Maury's "Scraps From The Lucky Bag" that were published under noms de plumes in newspapers, copied, and passed around in flyers in and outside of the USN to stir people to action for changes in the Navy and transcribed by William Maury Morris for these modern times.

The lucky bag is also defined as a where loose items from a ship are stored until being returned to the owner. According to the 1940 edition of The Bluejacket's Manual (a handbook for U.S. Navy enlisted personnel), "The lucky bag is a place where the police petty officers stow for safe-keeping effects that are found adrift about the ship. All clothes, etc., found about the decks are placed in the lucky bag. When clothes are piped down, the police petty officer attends and takes care of all clothes not called for and places these in the lucky bag. All effects in this bag belong to the person who lost them. At frequent intervals the lucky bag is opened and the effects distributed to the owners. Where persons have been guilty of carelessness in leaving their effects adrift, they are placed on the report." According to the log of the USS Yosemite, on June 24, 1898 several sailors were given 72 hours extra duty for having an article in the lucky bag.

== Lucky Bag Presidents ==
Collaborating with Jostens, the Lucky Bag president is responsible for managing the complete production of the Lucky Bag at the United States Naval Academy. This includes documenting 36 companies, 36 varsity sports, 20 club sports, 20 Brigade Support Activities, over 130 Extracurricular Activities, and numerous events across the Brigade of Midshipmen. The substantial weight of the book, often at 13 pounds, is a reflection of the comprehensive content it contains.

Class Year	President
2026	Avonlea Hotine
2025	Olivia Zhang
2024	Cooper Flowers
2023	Charles Plumly
2022	Sean McCullough
2021	Anna Walker
2020	Jeffrey Kramer

== Sources ==
- Williams, Frances Leigh (1963). Matthew Fontaine Maury, Scientist of the Seas. Rutgers University Press.
- Maury, Matthew Fontaine. "Scraps from the Lucky Bag (Collection)". Making of America. University of Michigan.
- The Bluejacket's Manual, United States Navy (10th ed.). Annapolis, Md.: United States Naval Institute. 1940.
