= Alfred Thayer Mahan Award for Literary Achievement =

The Alfred Thayer Mahan Award for Literary Achievement is awarded each year by the Navy League of the United States. The award is named for an American naval historian and theorist, Rear Admiral Alfred Thayer Mahan, United States Navy who, through his writing, provided stimulus and guidance to those who share in the defense of the nation. Presented since 1957, "this award for literary achievement is awarded to a U.S. Navy officer, U.S. Marine Corps officer, enlisted service member, or civilian who has made a notable literary contribution that has advanced the knowledge of the importance of sea power in the United States."

== List of award winners ==
The following is a complete list of award winners.

Year	Recipient
1957	Commander Malcolm W. Cagle, USN
1958	Commander Frank A. Manson, USN
1959	Hanson W. Baldwin
1960	Brigadier General James D. Hittle, USMC
1961	Rear Admiral Samuel Eliot Morison, USNR
1962	Captain Carl H. Amme, Jr., USN
1963	No Award
1964	George Fielding Eliot
1965	Rear Admiral George H. Miller, USN
1966	Rear Admiral James F. Calvert, USN
1967	Rear Admiral Ernest M. Eller, USN (ret.)
1968	Colonel Robert Debs Heinl, USMC
1969	Commander John Joseph O'Connor, CHC, USN
1970	Frank Uhlig, Jr.
1971	Commander James A. Barber, USN
1972	Lieutenant Colonel Donald K. Cliff, USMC
1973	John G. Morris
1974	Captain Sayer A. Swarztrauber, USN
1975	Commander Thomas B. Buell, USN
1976	Norman Polmar
1977	Professor E. B. Potter, U.S. Naval Academy
1978	Dr. Robert Seager II
1979	Lieutenant Colonel Robert C. McFarlane, USMC
1980	Captain Edward L. Beach, Jr., USN
1981	Commander Thomas B. Buell, USN (Ret.)
1982	Vice Admiral William P. Mack, USN
1983	Rear Admiral Max K. Morris, USN (Ret.)
1984	No Award
1985	Lieutenant General Victor H. Krulak, USMC (Ret.)
1986	Commander James John Tritten, USN
1987	L. Edgar Prina
1988	Dr. Jack Sweetman
1989	Lieutenant Commander Thomas J. Cutler, USN
1990	Tom Clancy
1991	Dr. John T. Mason, Jr.
1992	Lieutenant Commander Terry C. Pierce, USN
1993	Captain George Victor Galdorisi, USN, and Mr. Alec Lorimore
1994	Paul Stillwell
1995	Lieutenant Colonel Henry Thomas Hayden, USMC
1996	Colonel Joseph H. Alexander, USMC (Ret.)
1997	Mr. James W. Crawley
1998	Captain Richard C. Knott, USN (Ret.)
1999	Captain Eugene T. Gomulka, USN, and Mr. Frank J. Gaffney, Jr.
2000	Captain Edward L. Beach, Jr., USN (ret.)
2001	Brigadier General Edwin H. Simmons, USMC (Ret.)
2002	Colonel John Grider Miller, USMC (ret.)
2003	Lieutenant Commander David A. Adams, USN
2004	Captain Sam J. Tangredi, USN
2005	Commander John J. Klein, USN
2006	Intelligence Specialist First Class Thomas J. Miller, USN
2007	Commander Henry J. Hendrix, USN
2008	Admiral James L. Holloway III, USN (Ret.)
2009	Professor John Hattendorf, U.S. Naval War College
2010	Commander James Kraska, JAGC, USN, U.S. Naval War College
2011	Admiral James Stavridis, USN
2012	Sergeant John Jakeb Hawley, USMC
2013	Lieutenant Commander Benjamin "BJ" Armstrong, USN
2014	Lieutenant Joseph M. Hatfield, USN
2015	Major Edward H. Carpenter, USMC
2016	Captain Christopher H. Sharman, USN
2018	Lieutenant Commander Claude G. Berube, USNR, PhD
2020	None
2021	Captain Christopher H. Sharman, USN
2022	Lieutenant Commander Johnathan D. Falcone, USN
2023	Commander Jeffery E. Vandenengel, USN

== See also ==
- List of history awards
