= Ridley McLean =

US Navy Admiral (1872–1933)

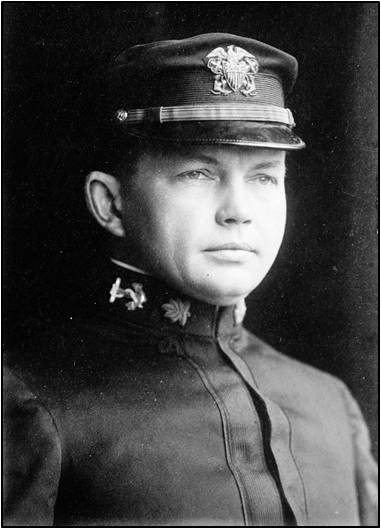
- LCDR Ridley McLean c.1912
- Born: 10 November 1872; Murfreesboro, Tennessee, US
- Died: 12 November 1933 (aged 61); USS Nevada San Francisco, California, US
- Burial place: Arlington National Cemetery
- Military career
- Allegiance: United States
- Branch: United States Navy
- Service years: 1894–1933
- Rank: Rear Admiral
- Commands: Judge Advocate General; USS Columbia; USS New Hampshire; USS Nebraska; USS Arkansas; Director of Naval Communications; Battle Force Submarines; Battleship Division 3
- Conflicts: Spanish–American War; Philippine–American War; Boxer Rebellion; World War I
- Awards: Navy Cross

Rear Admiral Ridley McLean, USN (10 November 1872 – 12 November 1933) was a two-star Admiral in the United States Navy. He was a Naval Academy graduate, the original author of the Navy's Bluejacket's Manual, and Judge Advocate General (JAG). He commanded a battleship in World War I, helped pioneer the naval use of shortwave communication, and led a submarine force and a battleship division.

== Early life ==
Ridley McLean was born in Murfreesboro, Tennessee, to Thornton and Sallie (Ridley) McLean. Thornton, the son of Kentucky Congressman Finis Ewing McLean, was in the banking business in Pulaski. Sallie died on November 22, 1872, just 12 days after giving birth to her only child. Thornton and Ridley soon left for California, lived there for a decade, and returned to Murfreesboro around 1883. Thornton died in 1887, leaving Ridley in the care of his maternal uncle, Army Captain B.L. Ridley, and his wife.

After two years at the University of Tennessee, Knoxville, Ridley was appointed to the U.S. Naval Academy by Congressman James D. Richardson. He entered on May 20, 1890, and graduated in 1894.

== Military career ==
=== Early career ===
In February 1900, McLean was assigned to the gunboat USS Marietta during the Reyes Rebellion in Nicaragua in February 1900. He was later attached to the staff of Rear Admiral Louis Kempff aboard his flagship, USS Kentucky, on which he participated in Boxer Rebellion in 1900 and the Philippine insurrection during 1901–1902.

In 1902, Lieutenant McLean wrote The Bluejacket's Manual for the United States Naval Institute, a book intended to provide information useful to new recruits and be a reference for every person in Naval service. In 1903, he contributed a chapter titled "Practical Naval Gunnery" to the Text Book of Ordinance and Gunnery.

In 1904, he was assistant to LCDR William Sims, Inspector of target practice; in 1906 was given orders to report to the USS Virginia. This tour would be cut short upon receipt of new orders to the staff of the Commander in Chief of the Atlantic Fleet, Rear Admiral Charles S. Sperry. Lieutenant Commander McLean was on the Admiral's flagship the USS Connecticut on its tour around the world in the Great White Fleet from 1907 to 1909. Following staff duty, McLean became Atlantic Fleet ordnance officer before assuming duties as the Executive Officer aboard the USS Florida.

In 1913, Commander McLean assumed what is normally a captain billet as Judge Advocate General of the US Navy, a position which entitled him the rank of captain in title only. He served in this role until December 1916, when he received orders to become commanding officer of the USS Columbia through May 1917.

=== World War I ===
When World War I broke out, Commander McLean served as chief of staff for the Battleship Force 1, Atlantic Fleet, under VADM Albert Grant. In 1918, he was chosen to command the USS New Hampshire, escorting allied convoys.

=== Post-war ===
His first command tour was cut short when he was assigned to command the USS Nebraska for a year beginning in September 1918. At the same time he was permanently appointed to the rank of captain. In 1919, he was stationed at the Army War College in Washington D.C.

From June 1922 through April 1924, Captain McLean was CO of the USS Arkansas. He became Director of Naval Communications in July 1924, and pioneered the use of shortwave radio communications when he authorized the experiment on board the USS Seattle on the 1925 cruise of Australia and New Zealand.

He was promoted to rear admiral in 1927 and assigned as Commander of Battleforce Submarines, using the submarine tender USS Holland as his flagship. Rear Admiral McLean fought for submarine sustainability and flexibility to fight long ways from home and for extended periods.

== Personal life ==
In November 1916, Commander McLean married Olive Gale Hill and became stepfather to her two children (Olive Beatrice and Gale) from a previous marriage.

== Death ==
On November 12, 1933, at the age of 61, Rear Admiral McLean, Commander of Battleship Division 3 died suddenly from a heart attack aboard his flagship the USS Nevada, while at anchor in San Francisco Bay. The following day funeral services were held on board the Nevada while the flag-draped coffin of the Rear Admiral lay on the deck. Crews from all 50 warships in San Francisco were summoned to stand at attention during the service. After the service was complete the Nevada steamed through Golden Gate, passing the USS Pennsylvania as she fired a 13-gun salute. His body was later interred at Arlington National Cemetery.

== Dates of rank ==
- Midshipman - 20 May 1890. Graduated class of 1894

Ensign	Lieutenant Junior Grade	Lieutenant	Lieutenant Commander	Commander	Captain
O-1	O-2	O-3	O-4	O-5	O-6
1894	abt. 1897	1901	abt. 1906	abt. 1913	1919

Rear Admiral (lower half)	Rear Admiral
O-7	O-8
1927	1932

== Decorations and awards ==
=== United States awards ===
Navy Cross; Awarded for actions during the World War I The President of the United States of America takes pleasure in presenting the Navy Cross to Captain Ridley McLean, United States Navy, for exceptionally meritorious service in a duty of great responsibility as Commanding Officer, U.S.S. New Hampshire during World War I, and as Chief of Staff of the Commander of Battleship Force 1, Atlantic Fleet. Action Date: World War I Service: Navy; Rank: Captain; Company: Commanding Officer; Division: U.S.S. New Hampshire
