= Thomas J. Cutler =

American historian

Thomas Joshua Cutler
- Born: August 30, 1947 (age 79); Baltimore, Maryland
- Education: Towson State University (BA, 1969); Norwich University (MA 1988)
- Spouse: Deborah Walsh Welch Cutler
- Military career
- Allegiance: United States of America
- Branch: United States Navy
- Service years: 1965–1990
- Known for: Naval Institute Press author
- Awards: see: Awards
- Other work: Naval historian, author, editor

Thomas Joshua Cutler (born August 30, 1947) is a retired United States naval officer, naval historian, author, and editor. He is "one of the most prolific authors in the history of the Naval Institute Press in terms of sold books."

== Family, early life, and education ==
The son of Torrence Manasseh and Helen Margaret (Gans) Cutler, Thomas J. Cutler was born in Baltimore, Maryland on August 30, 1947. He graduated from Towson State University with a Bachelor of Arts degree in 1969 and later earned a Master of Arts degree at Norwich University in 1988. He married Deborah Walsh Welch Cutler in 1971 and the couple had two children.

== Naval career and education ==
Cutler enlisted in the United States Navy in 1965 and rose to become a Gunner's Mate Second Class. Commissioned an ensign in 1969, he rose through the officer grades until he was commissioned a lieutenant commander in 1979 remaining on active duty until 1990. His active duty included an in-country combat tour in Vietnam during the Vietnam War, command of small craft, service in two aircraft carriers, three destroyers, and a guided-missile cruiser. While at the United States Naval Academy, serving between 1981 and 1990, where he was senior lecturer and Executive Assistant to the Chairman of the Seamanship and Navigation Department, and later, Associate Chairman of the History Department, he was awarded the William P. Clements Award for Excellence in Education (military teacher of the year).

== Civilian career ==
Cutler founded and served as the first Director of the Walbrook Maritime Academy in Baltimore, also commanding the Naval Junior Reserve Officer Training Corps unit there. In 1981, he became an associate editor of the United States Naval Institute and rose to become the institute's Director of Professional Publishing and currently holds the Gordon England Chair of Professional Naval Literature.

== Awards ==
- William P. Clements Award for Excellence in Education, United States Naval Academy military teacher of the year.
- Alfred Thayer Mahan Award for Literary Achievement, 1989
- U.S. Naval Institute Press Author of the Year, 2004
- U.S. Maritime Literature Award, 2006
- Commodore Dudley W. Knox Naval History Lifetime Achievement Award, 2015
- Naval War College Distinguished Fleet Professor Award, 2019

== Publications ==
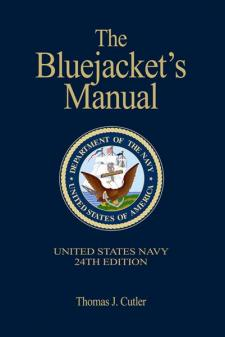
The Bluejacket's Manual, 24th edition.

- Brown Water, Black Berets: Coastal & Riverine Warfare in Vietnam (Annapolis: United States Naval Institute, 1989). ISBN 0870210114.
- The U.S. Naval Academy: An Illustrated History, by Jack Sweetman, 2nd edition, revised by Thomas J. Cutler (Annapolis: United States Naval Institute, 1995)
- The Battle of Leyte Gulf, October 23–26, 1944 (New York: HarperCollins, 1994). ISBN 0060169494; (Annapolis: United States Naval Institute, 2001). ISBN 1557502439.
- Dutton's Nautical Navigation, 15th edition, (Annapolis: United States Naval Institute, 2004)
- Dictionary of Naval Abbreviations compiled and edited by Deborah W. Cutler and Thomas J. Cutler (Annapolis: United States Naval Institute, 2005)
- Dictionary of Naval Terms 6th edition, compiled and edited by Deborah W. Cutler and Thomas J. Cutler (Annapolis: United States Naval Institute, 2005)
- A Sailor's History of the U.S. Navy (Annapolis: United States Naval Institute, 2005). ISBN 1591141516, 978-1591141518.
- NavCivGuide: A Handbook for Civilians in the U.S. Navy (Annapolis: United States Naval Institute, 2008)
- The Bluejacket's Manual 22nd, 23rd (Centennial) (2002), 24th (2009), and 25th editions. (Annapolis: United States Naval Institute). OCLC 1193370364.
- The Citizen's Guide to the U.S. Navy (Annapolis: United States Naval Institute, 2012)
- The U.S. Naval Institute on Naval Strategy, edited by Thomas J. Cutler (Annapolis: United States Naval Institute, 2015)
- The U.S. Naval Institute on Naval Leadership, edited by Thomas J. Cutler (Annapolis: United States Naval Institute, 2015)
- The U.S. Naval Institute on Naval Command, edited by Thomas J. Cutler (Annapolis: United States Naval Institute, 2016)
- The Parent's Guide to the U.S. Navy, (Annapolis: United States Naval Institute, 2017)
- The U.S. Naval Academy: The History, edited by Thomas J. Cutler (Annapolis: United States Naval Institute, 2015)
- The U.S. Naval Academy: The Challenges, edited by Thomas J. Cutler (Annapolis: United States Naval Institute, 2016)
- Women in the Navy: The History, edited by Thomas J. Cutler (Annapolis: United States Naval Institute, 2015)
- Women in the Navy: The Challenges, edited by Thomas J. Cutler (Annapolis: United States Naval Institute, 2015)
- The U.S. Navy Reserve, edited by Thomas J. Cutler (Annapolis: United States Naval Institute, 2015)
- The Panama Canal, edited by Thomas J. Cutler (Annapolis: United States Naval Institute, 2016)
- The United States Coast Guard, edited by Thomas J. Cutler (Annapolis: United States Naval Institute, 2017)
- Vietnam: Coastal and Riverine Warfare, edited by Thomas J. Cutler (Annapolis: United States Naval Institute, 2016)
- Vietnam: A Retrospective, edited by Thomas J. Cutler (Annapolis: United States Naval Institute, 2016)
- The Marine Corps at War, edited by Thomas J. Cutler (Annapolis: United States Naval Institute, 2016)
- Marine Corps Aviation, edited by Thomas J. Cutler (Annapolis: United States Naval Institute, 2016)
- The Battle of Leyte Gulf at 75: A Retrospective (Annapolis: United States Naval Institute, 2019)

Some of Cutler's works have been selections of the History Book Club, Military Book Club, and Book of the Month Club.
