= John Grider Miller =

American soldier

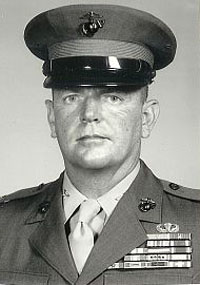
- Born: John Grider Miller; August 23, 1935; Annapolis, Maryland, U.S.
- Died: August 31, 2009 (aged 74); Annapolis, Maryland, U.S.
- Military career
- Allegiance: United States of America
- Branch: United States Marine Corps
- Service years: 1957–1985
- Rank: Colonel
- Conflicts: Vietnam War
- Awards: Legion of Merit with "V" Device; Bronze Star (2)

John Grider Miller (born 23 August 1935 in Annapolis, Maryland – died 31 August 2009 in Annapolis, Maryland) was a colonel in the United States Marine Corps, who served as managing editor of U.S. Naval Institute Proceedings and of Naval History.

== Career ==
After graduating from Yale in 1957, Miller was commissioned in the Marine Corps. He was an infantry officer, commanded a U. S. Marine battalion, and served as an advisor to the Republic of Vietnam Marine Corps during the Vietnam War. Later in his career, he was deputy director of the Marine Corps' History and Museums Division and was a speechwriter to three Commandant of the Marine Corps.

He joined the United States Naval Institute staff on 19 September 1985 and served until 31 August 2000, becoming managing editor of Proceedings and Naval History Magazine, the latter of which he had helped to establish in 1988.

He wrote several books of which the best known is The Bridge at Dong Ha, the story of Navy Cross recipient John Ripley (USMC).

In 2009, he was to be awarded the Brigadier General Robert L. Denig Memorial Distinguished Performance Award, but died less than three weeks before the award ceremony.

== Recognition ==
=== Military decorations ===
Parachutist Badge

Legion of Merit with "V" Device
Bronze Star with one award star
Defense Meritorious Service Medal
Meritorious Service Medal
Navy Presidential Unit Citation
Navy Unit Commendation
National Defense Service Medal
Vietnam Service Medal with four service stars
Vietnam Gallantry Cross Unit award
Vietnam Civil Actions Unit Citation
Vietnam Campaign Medal

=== Other awards ===
- Alfred Thayer Mahan Award for Literary Achievement, 2002.
- Brigadier General Robert L. Denig Memorial Distinguished Performance Award, 2009.

== Published books ==
- The Battle to save the Houston, October 1944 to March 1945. Annapolis: Naval Institute Press, 1985; 2000.
- The bridge at Dong Ha. Annapolis, Md.: Naval Institute Press, 1989.
- Punching out: launching a post-military career by Fred Mastin with John Grider Miller. New York: St. Martin's Press, 1994.
- The co-vans: U.S. Marine advisors in Vietnam. Annapolis, Md.: Naval Institute Press, 2000.
