= HPCR Manual on International Law Applicable to Air and Missile Warfare =

The HPCR Manual on International Law Applicable to Air and Missile Warfare (the HPCR Manual) was formulated by a multi-year project that was set up to restate the existing international laws applicable to air and missile warfare. The project was created in 2003 by the Program on Humanitarian Policy and Conflict Research at Harvard University (HPCR) after consulting with scholars and governmental experts.

In 1923, the Rules of Air Warfare were drafted at the Hague by a commission of jurists. Since then, air power has become a crucial element of military arsenal and modern warfare. The developments in air and missile technology in the last few decades have completely altered military strategy and created distinct challenges to the protection of civilians in time of armed conflict. Although a number of international treaties have been adopted in response to modern warfare, including the four 1949 Geneva Conventions for the Protection of War Victims, the two Additional Protocols of 1977, and various conventions regarding cultural property, biological weapons, and chemical weapons, many important aspects of air and missile operations are not included. Also, some of these instruments, especially AP/I, are not binding on all states, including the United States. Because of this, the Commentary on the HPCR Manual identifies US practices and positions which are consistent with the rules of AP/I.

== About the manual ==
The goal of the HPCR Manual is to give a methodical restatement of international law and air and missile warfare, based on the practice of States accepted as law and treaties in force. Because the authors of the HPCR Manual have no legislative power, there is no innovative aspect. By providing a reference on international law applicable to air and missile warfare, the HPCR Manual will help to stimulate discussions among legal advisors, military advisors, and humanitarian practitioners, which in turn will help improve the protection of civilians in armed conflict.

The HPCR Manual hopes to serve as a valuable resource for military forces while developing rules of engagement, writing military manuals, preparing training courses, and the actual conduct of armed forces in combat operations, while also providing the armed services' lawyers a cohesive text to assist them in their tasks. The HPCR Manual is a practical tool that will make decision-making easier in a real-time operational environment, while also giving confidence to those who utilize it. The objective of the HPCR Manual is to be of help to those who plan, approve or execute air or missile operations before rather than after the event. The HPCR Manual is also meant to be used by other segments of armed forces, such as commanders of forces that are receiving these attacks. Needless to say, it is hoped that the HPCR Manual will be used extensively in training and instruction courses in both wartime and peacetime, so as to familiarize prospective users with the patterns of behavior expected of them.

=== The black letter rules and the accompanying commentary ===
The black letter rules of the HPCR Manual are a collective creation of the group of experts. The black letter rules reflect the consensus of the group of experts as to the state of the most significant elements of international humanitarian law bearing on air and missile warfare in 2009. Each black letter rule of the HPCR Manual includes a user-friendly explanation for both legal advisers and those who plan, approve or execute air or missile operations on both sides of the armed conflict. The commentary is done in "bullet point" style.

== Expert participants ==
The Core Group of Experts is made up of 24 people, including Claude Bruderlein, Director of the Program on Humanitarian Policy and Conflict Research at Harvard University, Dr. Yoram Dinstein, Senior Academic Advisor at HPCR and Professor Emeritus of International Law at Tel Aviv University, Knut Dörmann, Head of the Legal Division at the International Committee of the Red Cross, Dr. Frits Kalshoven, Professor Emeritus of International Law at Leiden University, Colonel (ret.) W. Hays Parks, Former Special Assistant to the Judge Advocate General of the Army for Law of War Matters with the Office of General Counsel in the US Department of Defense, Professor Michael N Schmitt, Dean and Professor of International Law at the George C. Marshall Center, and Dr. Zhu Wenqi, Professor of International Law at the Law School of Renmin University of China. Other experts, including 7 government experts and 6 experts that participated in some of the sessions, also contributed to the HPCR Manual.
