= Use of force in international law =

Military intervention

The use of force by states under international law is controlled by both customary international law and by treaty law. The UN Charter reads in article 2(4):

All members shall refrain in their international relations from the threat or use of force against the territorial integrity or political independence of any state, or in any other manner inconsistent with the purposes of the United Nations.

International law under the UN Charter contemplates the use of force in two circumstances: (1) as self-defense against an armed attack under Article 51, or (2) when authorized by the UN Security Council to maintain international peace under Article 42. This principle is now considered to be a part of customary international law, and has the effect of banning the use of armed force except for two situations authorized by the UN Charter. Firstly, the United Nations Security Council, under powers granted in Articles 24 and 25, and Chapter VII of the UN Charter, may authorize collective action to maintain or enforce international peace and security. Secondly, Article 51 also states that: "Nothing in the present Charter shall impair the inherent right of individual or collective self-defence if an armed attack occurs against a member of the United Nations." There are also more controversial claims by some states of a right of humanitarian intervention, reprisals and the protection of nationals abroad.

According to Christine Gray, "The law on the use of force is one of the most controversial areas of international law..."

== Collective action ==
The concept of collective action replaces the one of military alliances between states to ensure the collective defense of a state by its allies in case of aggression by another state, which prevailed until World War II. The term "collective action" refers to a system put in place by the United Nations Charter in 1945 based on the need to defend the international public order after the Second World War. Under this system, the United Nations Security Council is authorized to determine the existence of, and take action to address, any threat to international peace and security. In practice this power has been relatively little-used because of the presence of five veto-wielding permanent members with interests in a given issue. Typically measures short of armed force are taken before armed force, such as the imposition of sanctions.

The first authorization of the use of force by the UN Security Council was during the Korean War (1950–1953) in response to North Korea's invasion of South Korea in June 1950. Resolutions 82 and 83 recommended that its member states provide military assistance to South Korea to restore peace, resulting in a US-led coalition. Although the framers of the UN Charter originally envisaged that the United Nations would have its own designated forces to use for enforcement, the intervention in Korea was effectively controlled by forces under United States' command. The United Nations' forces—under the auspices of the United Nations Command—comprised 21 countries, with the U.S. providing around 90% of military personnel. The weaknesses of the system are also notable in the fact that the resolution was only passed because of a Soviet boycott and the occupation of China's seat by the Nationalist Chinese of Taiwan.

The Security Council did not authorize the use of significant armed force again until the invasion of Kuwait by Iraq in 1990. After passing resolutions demanding a withdrawal, the Council passed Resolution 678, which authorized the use of force and requested all member states to provide the necessary support to a force operating in cooperation with Kuwait to ensure the withdrawal of Iraqi forces. This resolution was never revoked.

On 8 November 2002, the Security Council passed Resolution 1441, by a unanimous 15–0 vote: Russia, China, France, and Arab states such as Syria voted in favor. It has been argued that 1441 implicitly authorized UN member states to wage war against Iraq without any further decision by the UN Security Council. The representatives in the meeting were clear that this was not the case. The United States Ambassador to the United Nations, John Negroponte, said: "[T]his resolution contains no "hidden triggers" and no "automaticity" with respect to the use of force. If there is a further Iraqi breach, reported to the council by UNMOVIC, the IAEA or a Member State, the matter will return to the council for discussions as required in paragraph 12. The resolution makes clear that any Iraqi failure to comply is unacceptable and that Iraq must be disarmed. And, one way or another, Iraq will be disarmed. If the Security Council fails to act decisively in the event of further Iraqi violations, this resolution does not constrain any Member State from acting to defend itself against the threat posed by Iraq or to enforce relevant United Nations resolutions and protect world peace and security.

"The ambassador for the United Kingdom, the co-sponsor of the resolution, said: "We heard loud and clear during the negotiations the concerns about "automaticity" and "hidden triggers" – the concern that on a decision so crucial we should not rush into military action; that on a decision so crucial any Iraqi violations should be discussed by the council. Let me be equally clear in response ... There is no "automaticity" in this resolution. If there is a further Iraqi breach of its disarmament obligations, the matter will return to the council for discussion as required in paragraph 12. We would expect the Security Council then to meet its responsibilities." The message was further confirmed by the ambassador for Syria: "Syria voted in favour of the resolution, having received reassurances from its sponsors, the United States of America and the United Kingdom, and from France and Russia through high-level contacts, that it would not be used as a pretext for striking against Iraq and does not constitute a basis for any automatic strikes against Iraq. The resolution should not be interpreted, through certain paragraphs, as authorizing any State to use force. It reaffirms the central role of the Security Council in addressing all phases of the Iraqi issue.

The UN has also authorized the use of force in peacekeeping or humanitarian interventions, notably in the former Yugoslavia, Somalia, and Sierra Leone.

== Self-defense ==
Article 51:

Nothing in the present Charter shall impair the inherent right of collective or individual self-defence if an armed attack occurs against a member of the United Nations, until the Security Council has taken the measures necessary to maintain international peace and security. Measures taken by members in exercise of this right of self-defence shall be immediately reported to the Security Council and shall not in any way affect the authority and responsibility of the Security Council under the present Charter to take at any time such action as it deems necessary in order to maintain or restore international peace and security.

Thus there is a right of self-defence under customary international law, as the International Court of Justice (ICJ) affirmed in the Nicaragua Case on the use of force. Some commentators believe that the effect of Article 51 is only to preserve this right when an armed attack occurs, and that other acts of self-defence are banned by article 2(4). The more widely held opinion is that article 51 acknowledges this general right, and proceeds to lay down procedures for the specific situation when an armed attack does occur. Under the latter interpretation, the legitimate use of self-defence in situations when an armed attack has not actually occurred is permitted. Not every act of violence will constitute an armed attack. The ICJ has tried to clarify, in the Nicaragua case, what level of force is necessary to qualify as an armed attack.

The traditional customary rules on self-defence derive from an early diplomatic incident between the United States and the United Kingdom over the killing of some US citizens engaged in an attack on Canada, then a British colony. The so-called Caroline case established that there had to exist "a necessity of self-defence, instant, overwhelming, leaving no choice of means, and no moment of deliberation,' and furthermore that any action taken must be proportionate, "since the act justified by the necessity of self-defence, must be limited by that necessity, and kept clearly within it." These statements by the US Secretary of State to the British authorities are accepted as an accurate description of the customary right of self-defence.

=== Pre-emptive force ===
There is a limited right of preemptive self-defence under customary law. Its continuing permissibility under the Charter hinges on the interpretation of article 51. If it permits self-defence only when an armed attack has occurred, then there can be no right to preemptive self-defence. However, few observers really think that a state must wait for an armed attack to actually begin before taking action. A distinction can be drawn between "preventive" self-defence, which takes place when an attack is merely possible or foreseeable, and a permitted "interventionary" or "anticipatory" self-defence, which takes place when an armed attack is imminent and inevitable. The right to use interventionary, pre-emptive armed force in the face of an imminent attack has not been ruled out by the ICJ. But state practice and opinio juris overwhelmingly suggests that there is no right of preventive self-defence under international law.

=== Protection of nationals ===
The controversial claim to a right to use force in order to protect nationals abroad has been asserted by some States. Examples include intervention by the UK in Suez (1956), Israel in Entebbe (1976) and the US in the Dominican Republic (1965), Grenada (1983) and Panama (1989). The majority of States are doubtful about the existence of such a right. It is often claimed alongside other rights and reasons for using force. For example, the USA intervention in Grenada was widely considered to be in response to the rise to power of a socialist government. The danger that this posed to US nationals was doubtful and resulted in condemnation by the General Assembly. As with the above examples (except the Entebbe incident), the protection of nationals is often used as an excuse for other political objectives.

== Humanitarian intervention ==
In recent years several countries have begun to argue for the existence of a right of humanitarian intervention without Security Council authorization. In the aftermath of the Kosovo crisis in 1999, the UK Foreign Secretary asserted that, "In international law, in exceptional circumstances and to avoid a humanitarian catastrophe, military action can be taken and it is on that legal basis that military action was taken." It is difficult to reconcile this statement with the UN Charter. When NATO used military force against the Yugoslav state, it did not have authorization from the Security Council, but it was not condemned either. This is because veto-wielding countries held strong positions on both sides of the dispute.

Many countries oppose such unauthorized humanitarian interventions on the formal ground that they are simply illegal, or on the practical ground that such a right would only be ever used against weaker states by stronger states. This was specifically shown in the Ministerial Declaration of G-77 countries, in which 134 states condemned such intervention. Proponents have typically resorted to a claim that the right has developed as a new part of customary law.

== The use of non-military force ==
There has been widespread debate about the significance of the phrasing of article 2(4), specifically about the use of the solitary word "force." There is a strain of opinion holding that whereas "armed attack" is referred to in article 51, the use of the word "force" in 2(4) holds a wider meaning, encompassing economic force or other methods of non-military coercion. This issue was examined in James A. DeLanis, "Force" Under Article 2(4) of the United Nations Charter: The Question of Economic and Political Coercion, 12 Vand. J. of Transnational L. 101 (1979) . Cyber-attacks, according to some frameworks such as the Schmitt analysis, could be seen in some cases as being a use of force. Although such measures may be banned by certain other provisions of the Charter, it does not seem possible to justify such a wide non-military interpretation of 2(4) in the light of subsequent state practice. This article covers the threat of force, which is not permissible in a situation where the use of actual armed force would not be.

== See also ==
- International law
- Law of war
- Humanitarian intervention
- UN Security Council
- Chapter VII of the United Nations Charter
- Korean War
- Just war theory
- Kosovo independence precedent
