= Charles H. Stockton Professor of International Law =

Chair at the United States Naval War College

The Charles H. Stockton Chair of International Law at the United States Naval War College has its origins in the Naval War College's oldest civilian academic post. The first civilian academic at the college, James R. Soley was appointed in 1885 to lecture on international law. Dr. Freeman Snow of Harvard University gave lectures on the subject in 1894, his death in the midst of the academic program led to the appointment then Commander Charles Stockton to complete his lectures and to publish them for the use of the Navy. Stockton prepared a new edition in 1898, teaching classes in the subject. In 1901, Professoe John Bassett Moore lectured on international law and recommended that the college appoint Harvard University Law professor George Grafton Wilson as the visiting professor. Wilson lectured annually from 1901 to 1937. From 1946 to 1953, Professor Manley Hudson of Harvard regularly came from Cambridge to give the college's International Law lectures.

On 11 July 1951, the Chief of Naval Personnel approved the formal establishment of a full-time professorship to replace the part-time position. On 6 October 1967, the Secretary of the Navy designated the academic post as the Charles H. Stockton Chair of International Law in honor of Rear Admiral Charles Stockton, President of the Naval War College (1891 and 1898–1900), who had been the US Navy's first uniformed expert in international law.

The Stockton Chair was filled by distinguished visiting professors from its establishment until 2014, when the Chairperson of the Stockton Center for International Law was designated as the Stockton Professor. At that time, the Naval War College established the position of Charles H. Stockton Distinguished Scholar-in-Residence, to be held by visiting scholars of the international academic distinction.

== List of office-holders ==
- 1953-1954 Hans Kelsen
- 1954-1955 Leo Gross
- 1955-1956 Brunson MacChesney
- 1956-1957 Ralph G. Jones
- 1957-1958 Vacant
- 1958-1959 Roland J. Stanger
- 1959-1960 Carl M. Franklin
- 1960-1961 William T. Mallison, Jr.
- 1961-1962 Neill H. Alford, Jr.
- 1962-1963 Carl Q. Christol
- 1963-1964 Gordon B. Baldwin
- 1964-1965 Vacant
- 1965-1966 James F. Hogg
- 1966-1967 Dennis M. O'Connor
- 1967-1968 John H. Spencer
- 1968-1969 Richard B. Lillich
- 1969-1970 Oliver J. Lissitzyn
- 1970-1971 L. F. E. Goldie
- 1971-1972 Howard S. Levie
- 1972-1974 Alwyn V. Freeman
- 1974-1975 William T. Mallison, Jr.
- 1975-1977 Vacant
- 1977-1979 Gordon Christenson
- 1979-1980 Hamilton DeSaussure
- 1980-1981 John F. Murphy
- 1981-1982 Alfred P. Rubin
- 1982-1983 Jon L. Jacobson
- 1983-1984 George Bunn
- 1984-1985 W. Hays Parks
- 1985-1986 George Bunn
- 1986-1989 Richard J. Grunawalt
- 1989-1990 Alberto R. Coll
- 1990-1991 John H. McNeill
- 1991-1992 Horace B. Robertson, Jr.
- 1992-1993 George K. Walker
- 1993-1994 Richard J. Grunawalt
- 1994-1995 Robert F. Turner
- 1995-1996 Myron H. Nordquist
- 1996-1998 Leslie C. Green
- 1998-1999 Ruth Wedgwood
- 1999-2000 Yoram Dinstein
- 2000-2001 Ivan Shearer
- 2001-2001 Nicholas Rostow
- 2002-2003 Yoram Dinstein
- 2003-2004 Wolff Heintschel von Heinegg
- 2004-2005 Charles Garraway
- 2005-2006 Jane Dalton
- 2006-2007 Craig H. Allen
- 2007-2008 Michael N Schmitt
- 2008-2009 Richard J. Grunawalt
- 2009-2010 Derek Jenks
- 2010-2012 Ken Watkin
- 2012-2013 Wolff Heintschel von Heinegg
- 2014-2018 Michael N Schmitt
- 2015-2016 Timothy McCormack (Stockton Distinguished Scholar-in-Residence)
- 2018–present James Kraska
- 2020–present Michael Schmitt (Stockton Distinguished Scholar-in-Residence)
