= John Ripley (USMC) =

United States Marine Corps officer (1939–2008)

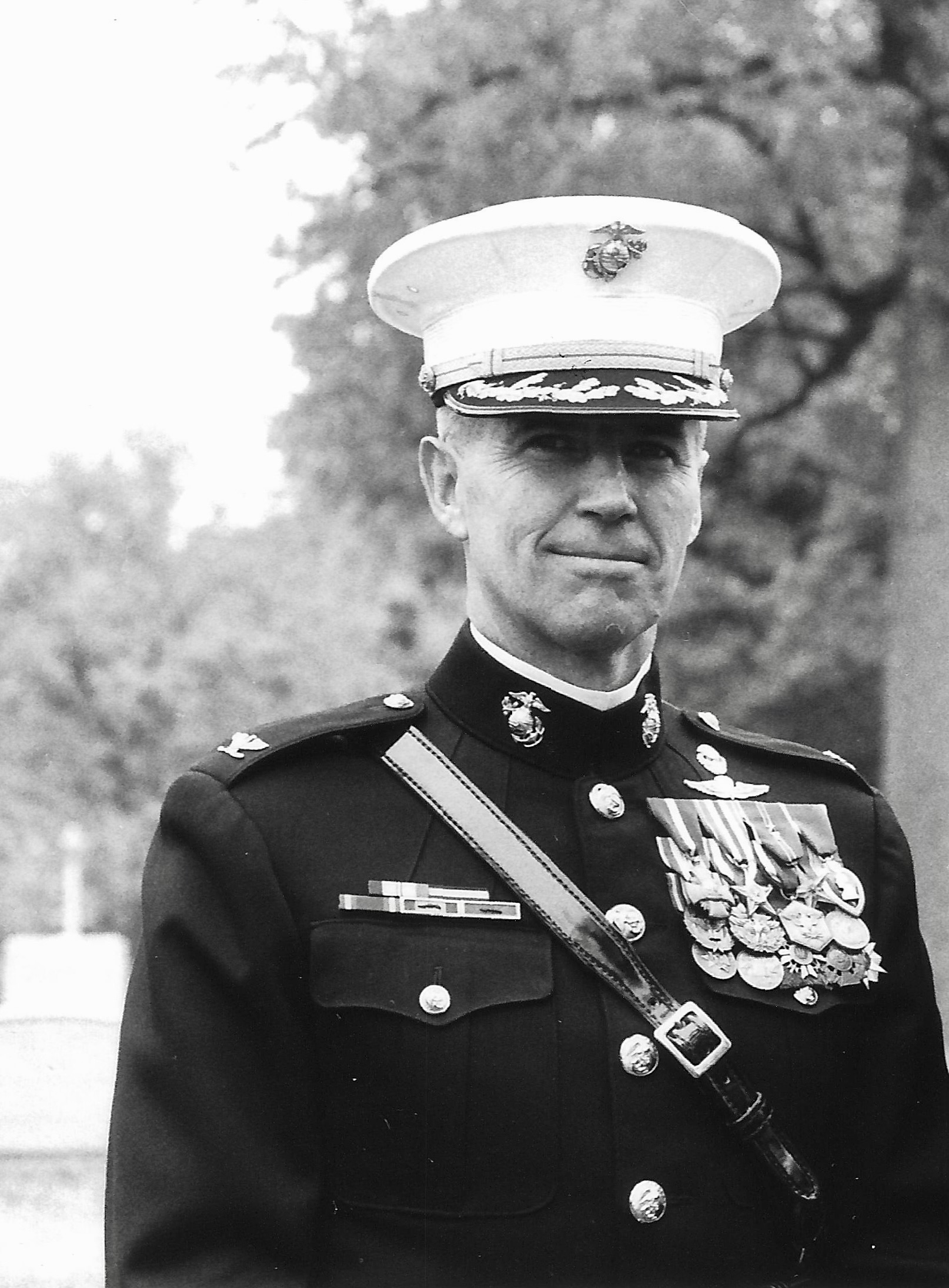
- Col. John W Ripley at USNA Parade 1987
- Born: John Walter Ripley; June 29, 1939; Radford, Virginia, U.S.
- Died: October 28, 2008 (aged 69); Annapolis, Maryland, U.S.
- Burial place: United States Naval Academy Cemetery
- Military career
- Allegiance: United States
- Branch: United States Marine Corps
- Service years: 1957–1992
- Rank: Colonel
- Nickname: "Rip"
- Commands: 2nd Marine Regiment; 1st Battalion 2nd Marines
- Conflicts: Vietnam War
- Awards: Medal of Honor; Silver Star; Legion of Merit (2); Bronze Star Medal (2); Purple Heart
- Other work: Southern Virginia University; Hargrave Military Academy; USMC History & Museums Division, Director

External image
- Diorama depicting Colonel John Ripley underneath the Dong Ha bridge located at the United States Naval Academy. Displayed at Modern American Heroes by Norman Fulkerson.

John Walter Ripley (June 29, 1939 – October 28, 2008) was a decorated United States Marine Corps Colonel who received the Medal of Honor for his actions in combat during the Vietnam War. On 2 April 1972, Ripley repeatedly exposed himself to intense enemy fire over a three-hour period as he prepared to blow up an essential bridge in Đông Hà. His actions delayed the North Vietnamese Army's advance into South Vietnam.

== Marine career ==
John Walter Ripley was born on June 29, 1939, in Radford, Virginia and his family lived there until he was five years old. They then moved to Portsmouth, Ohio, where they remained for some years before finally settling in Radford, Virginia. After graduating from Radford High School, Ripley enlisted into the Marine Corps in 1957 at age 17.

A year later, he was appointed to the U.S. Naval Academy by the Secretary of the Navy. He graduated in 1962 with a Bachelor of Science degree in electrical engineering, and received his commission as a second lieutenant. After completing The Basic School, he joined the Marine detachment on the USS Independence. After his sea duty, he joined 2nd Battalion, 2nd Marines. In May 1965, Ripley was transferred to 2nd Force Reconnaissance Company, and after training, he deployed to South Vietnam with his platoon.

In October 1966, Ripley joined 3rd Battalion 3rd Marines in South Vietnam. He served as company commander of Lima Company, known as Ripley's Raiders, was wounded in action, then returned to active duty and completed his combat tour. In October 1969, he was selected to serve as exchange officer with the British Royal Marines and Special Boat Service.

During his two years of Vietnam service, he participated in 26 major operations. In addition to numerous decorations for extensive combat experience at the rifle company and battalion levels, Ripley was awarded the Navy Cross for extraordinary heroism in destroying the Đông Hà bridge during the April 1972 North Vietnamese Easter Offensive (also known as the Nguyen Hue Offensive). It was later upgraded to the Medal of Honor. His destruction of the Dong Ha bridge is memorialized at the U.S. Naval Academy with a large diorama titled "Ripley at the Bridge."

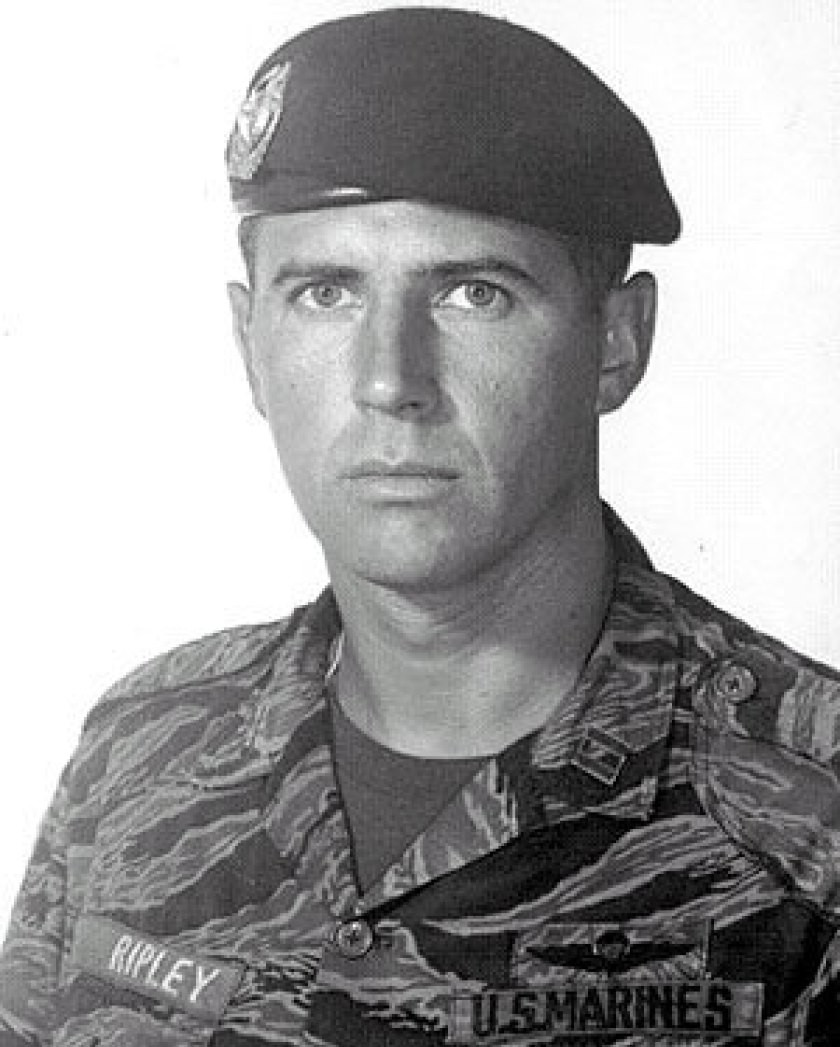
John Ripley in 1971

As the South Vietnamese Marine Corps' 3rd Battalion guarded the south end of the bridge over the Dong Ha River, and assisted from the nearby road by Army Major James E. Smock who fed him boxes of explosives and under intense unrelenting enemy fire, Ripley dangled for an estimated three hours under the bridge in order to attach 500 pounds of the explosives to the span, ultimately obliterating it. His action, conducted under enemy fire while going back and forth for materials, definitively thwarted an onslaught by 20,000 enemy troops and dozens of tanks and was the subject of a book, The Bridge at Dong Ha, by Colonel John Grider Miller. He attributes his success to the help of God and his mother. When his energy was about to give out he began a rhythmic chant, "Jesus, Mary, Get me there". His body taxed to its extreme limits, his action is considered one of the greatest examples of concentration under fire in the annals of U.S. military history.

Following his tours in Vietnam, he was promoted to major on 1 June 1972 and became an instructor at Oregon State University. He also served as the military aide to General Snowden and aide to the Chief of Staff of the Marine Corps during the late 1970s. As a lieutenant colonel, he assumed command of 1st Battalion, 2nd Marines from July 1979 to May 1981. During this time they deployed for Combined Arms Exercise 2–80, then to the Mountain Warfare Training Center. Upon completion of his tour with the 2nd Marines, he attended Naval War College in Newport, Rhode Island, graduating in 1982. He then reported to the Joint Staff, Joint Chiefs of Staff, serving as Political-Military Planner and branch chief, European Division, J-5. Ripley was next assigned to the U.S. Naval Academy where he served as senior Marine and director, Division of English and History from 1984 to 1987. He was promoted to colonel on 1 July 1984. He next spent a year as assistant chief of staff, G-3, with 3rd Marine Expeditionary Force, Okinawa, Japan. He assumed command of the 2nd Marine Regiment, Camp Lejeune, North Carolina from 14 July 1988 to 19 July 1990. The 2nd Marines deployed twice as a regiment to Norway. His final tours in the Marine Corps were in charge of the NROTC detachments at Oregon State University and the Virginia Military Institute, and as the senior Marine at the U.S. Naval Academy teaching English and history. He earned the "Quad Body" distinction for making it through four of the toughest military training programs in the world: the Army Rangers, Marine Reconnaissance, Underwater Demolition Team and Britain's Royal Marines Commandos, according to Miller's book. He was the first Marine officer to be inducted in the U.S. Army Ranger Hall of Fame. He retired from the Marine Corps in 1992 after 31 years of active duty service.

== Post-active duty ==
After his retirement from active duty in 1992, Ripley became president and chancellor of Southern Seminary College for Women (now Southern Virginia University) in Buena Vista, Virginia. In 1997, he stepped down as the head of Southern Seminary and headed to Chatham, Virginia where he took charge of Hargrave Military Academy as the private military boarding school's eighth president, remaining in command for two years. He was selected in 1999 by the Commandant of the Marine Corps as the director of the History and Museums Division.

On June 26, 1992 (a month before he retired from the Marine Corps) he testified against women in the military before a presidential commission. He based his arguments on a defense of "femininity, motherhood, and what we have come to appreciate in Western culture as the graceful conduct of women." In the following year he spoke against homosexuals in the military during the House Armed Services Committee hearings that preceded the implementation of President Clinton's "Don't ask, don't tell" policy.

As a result of combat action, Ripley contracted a disease that in the summer of 2002 required a liver transplant. Nearing death, with little time left and already having received Last Rites twice, a replacement liver was located. The Commandant of the Marine Corps, who called Ripley a living symbol of pride, sent a section of CH-46s helicopters from the Marine One presidential squadron to Philadelphia to retrieve the liver. After further coordination with the Washington D.C. Police to obtain a landing zone in the city, the liver was delivered in time for a successful transplant. According to Ripley's son Thomas, Commandant James L. Jones also visited Ripley in his hospital bed accompanied by the Color Sergeant of the Marine Corps and the Battle Colors. He told Ripley, "The Colors don't leave the room until you do."

In October 2006, Ripley returned to the site of the Dong Ha Bridge to film a documentary of his action. The documentary was hosted by Oliver North, and was shown on November 12, 2006, on Fox News.

On October 28, 2009, the first biography about Ripley was published. It was written by Norman Fulkerson and is titled An American Knight, The Life of Col. John W. Ripley.

== Awards and decorations ==
U.S. military decorations
Medal of Honor
Navy Cross (Later upgraded)
Silver Star
Legion of Merit with gold second award star
Bronze Star Medal with Combat Distinguishing Device and gold second award star
Purple Heart
Defense Meritorious Service Medal with oak leaf cluster
Meritorious Service Medal
Navy and Marine Corps Commendation Medal with gold award star
Combat Action Ribbon
U.S. Unit Awards
Presidential Unit Citation
Navy Unit Commendation
U.S. Service (Campaign) Medals and Service and Training Ribbons
National Defense Service Medal with bronze service star
Armed Forces Expeditionary Medal
Vietnam Service Medal with silver service star
Sea Service Deployment Ribbon with four bronze service stars
South Vietnamese Army Distinguished Service Order, 2nd Class
Vietnam Gallantry Cross
Vietnam Civil Actions Medal
Vietnam Campaign Medal

U.S. badges, patches and tabs
Scuba Diver Badge
Navy and Marine Corps Parachutist Insignia
Rifle Expert Badge
Pistol Expert Badge

In 2002, he also became the very first Marine officer to receive the "Distinguished Graduate Award", the highest and most prestigious award given by the U.S. Naval Academy. Also, in May 2004, Marines of the 22nd Marine Expeditionary Unit named a Forward Operating Base after him "FOB Ripley" (later Multi National Base Tarin Kot) in south-central Afghanistan.

In July 2006, the Naval Academy Preparatory School in Newport, Rhode Island, dedicated its new dormitory as "Ripley Hall", honoring their former graduate.

On June 11, 2008, Ripley became the first Marine to be inducted into the U.S. Army Ranger Hall of Fame — honored for his actions at Dong Ha Bridge, on Easter morning 1972.

On Tuesday, November 11, 2008, Veteran's Day, Ripley's hometown of Radford, VA, held a ceremony in memory of him. It had originally been intended to be in honor of him, but he died a couple of weeks before the ceremony took place. His son was presented with a key to the city and a plaque declaring November 11, 2008, John W Ripley Day in Radford, VA.

On Tuesday, March 3, 2026, a bill was passed through Congress authorizing his Navy Cross to be upgraded to the Medal of Honor. On Thursday, June 18, 2026, Ripley's family received his posthumous Medal of Honor.

=== Medal of Honor citation ===
Citation

The President of the United States, in the name of The Congress, takes pleasure in presenting the Medal of Honor to Colonel John Ripley. For conspicuous gallantry and intrepidity at the risk of his life above and beyond the call of duty on 2 April 1972 while serving as Senior Marine Advisor to the Third Vietnamese Marine Corps Infantry Battalion in the Republic of Vietnam. Based on a report that a large and rapidly moving mechanized North Vietnamese army force was attacking south along Route #1, Third Battalion was positioned to defend the key village of Dong Ha and its surrounding area. It became clear the enemy advance could not be halted unless the bridge over the river at Dong Ha was destroyed. To personally supervise this dangerous and vital mission, Captain Ripley advanced to the bridge where he located 500 pounds of explosives that had been prepositioned there earlier, but access to it was blocked by a chain-link fence. He was forced to climb hand over hand along the steel beams of the bridge to reposition the explosives properly so the bridge could be destroyed. On five separate occasions, both physically exhausted and exposed to continual enemy fire, Captain Ripley completely disregarded his own safety as he moved to key points along the bridge and securely emplaced the explosives. He then detonated the charges and destroyed the bridge, thus thwarting the enemy’s assault. By his bold and audacious actions, extraordinary courage under fire, and complete dedication to duty, Captain Ripley reflected great credit upon himself and upheld the highest traditions of the Marine Corps and the United States Naval Service.

=== Navy Cross citation ===
Citation:

The President of the United States of America takes pleasure in presenting the Navy Cross to Captain John W. Ripley (MCSN: 0-84239), United States Marine Corps, for extraordinary heroism on 2 April 1972 while serving as the Senior Marine Advisor to the Third Vietnamese Marine Corps Infantry Battalion in the Republic of Vietnam. Upon receipt of a report that a rapidly moving, mechanized, North Vietnamese army force, estimated at reinforced divisional strength, was attacking south along Route #1, the Third Vietnamese Marine Infantry Battalion was positioned to defend a key village and the surrounding area. It became imperative that a vital river bridge be destroyed if the overall security of the northern provinces of Military Region One was to be maintained. Advancing to the bridge to personally supervise this most dangerous but vitally important assignment, Captain Ripley located a large amount of explosives which had been pre-positioned there earlier, access to which was blocked by a chain-link fence. In order to reposition the approximately 500 pounds of explosives, Captain Ripley was obliged to reach up and hand-walk along the beams while his body dangled beneath the bridge. On five separate occasions, in the face of constant enemy fire, he moved to points along the bridge and, with the aid of another advisor who pushed the explosives to him, securely emplaced them. He then detonated the charges and destroyed the bridge, thereby stopping the enemy assault. By his heroic actions and extraordinary courage, Captain Ripley undoubtedly was instrumental in saving an untold number of lives. His inspiring efforts reflected great credit upon himself, the Marine Corps, and the United States Naval Service.

=== Silver Star citation ===
Citation:

The President of the United States of America takes pleasure in presenting the Silver Star to Captain John Walter Ripley (MCSN: 0-84239/1653859), United States Marine Corps, for conspicuous gallantry and intrepidity in action while serving as Commanding Officer of Company L, Third Battalion, Third Marines, THIRD Marine Division, in connection with operations against the enemy in the Republic of Vietnam. On 21 August 1967, Company L was assigned the mission of reinforcing a convoy that had been surprised by a large enemy force and was pinned down. With one rifle platoon, a small command group, and accompanied by two M-42 dual 40-mm. anti-aircraft guns, Captain Ripley was leading the relief column when it suddenly came under intense enemy automatic weapons and recoilless rifle fire. Disregarding his own safety and the heavy volume of hostile fire, he moved to the machine gun mounted on the vehicle and opened fire, pinpointing the location of the well concealed North Vietnamese and enabling the 40-mm. guns to deliver accurate fire on the enemy positions. Directing his unit to dismount, he quickly organized a defensive perimeter while coordinating supporting artillery fire and simultaneously controlling the remainder of his company which was widely separated from his position. Repeatedly exposing himself to the hostile fire, he directed artillery fire and air strikes upon the attacking enemy force and courageously adjusted fire missions to within fifty meters of his position. Throughout the following three hours, his skillful employment of supporting arms and direction of the fire of his men repulsed the determined enemy attacks and forced the hostile units to flee in panic and confusion. His aggressiveness and outstanding professionalism were an inspiration to all who served with him and were instrumental in the successful extraction of his unit from an extremely hazardous situation. By his steadfast courage, superb leadership and unfaltering devotion to duty at great personal risk, Captain Ripley upheld the highest traditions of the Marine Corps and of the United States Naval Service.

== Death ==
Ripley died suddenly on October 28, 2008, at his home in Annapolis, Maryland, at age 69 of undetermined causes. He was survived by his wife of 44 years, the former Moline Blaylock, three sons and a daughter. Ripley was buried with full military honors on November 7 at the United States Naval Academy Cemetery. Moline died eleven months after her husband, on September 12, 2009, from complications due to Alzheimer's disease, aged 68.
