= Robert F. Turner =

American professor of international law and national security law

- Born: February 14, 1944 (age 82)
- Education: Indiana University; University of Virginia
- Scientific career
- Fields: International law National Security Law
- Workplaces: U.S. Department of Defense; U.S. Naval War College; University of Virginia
- Website: Robert F. Turner, Professor

Robert F. Turner (born February 14, 1944) is an American academic. He was a professor of international law and national security law at the University of Virginia and the co-founder of its Center for National Security Law.

== Education ==
Turner earned his BA in Government with honors from Indiana University in 1968. While attending the university, he became chairman of the Intercollegiate Society of Individualists Conservative League. Later, he became the National Research Director for Student Committee for Victory in Vietnam. He undertook graduate work in history and political science at Stanford University in 1972 and 1973 while employed by the Hoover Institution. He enrolled in Government and Foreign Affairs coursework in 1979-1981 while attending law school at the University of Virginia, where he earned his J.D degree. He earned a Doctor of Juridical Science (SJD) degree from UVA in 1996.

== Career ==
Turner was a correspondent in Vietnam for the Indianapolis News in 1968. He was commissioned a U.S. Army captain through the ROTC program and assigned to the intelligence services. He served in Vietnam from 1968 through 1971, primarily assigned to MACV on detail to the US Embassy as Assistant Special Projects Officer, North Vietnam/Viet Cong Affairs Division. His duties included interviewing senior communist defectors and prisoners and briefing the media. In his capacity as Special Projects Officer, he also authored a top secret monograph on Viet Cong assassination policy.

In 1971, he became a research assistant at the Hoover Institution on War, Revolution and Peace, where "he contributed ten chapters on communist movements in Southeast Asia to the Yearbook on International Communist Affairs (1972)." In 1972, he became a Public Affairs Fellow. He spent his first year researching at Stanford and completing his book on Vietnamese Communism and his second year on Capitol Hill. During that period, he also served as Associate Editor (Asia and Pacific) for the Yearbook on International Communist Affairs (1973-1974).

When his fellowship was complete, Turner became Special Assistant and Legislative Assistant to U.S. Senator Robert P. Griffin of Michigan for five years. He served as Griffin's national security advisor and was responsible for Foreign Affairs, Armed Services and Intelligence issues. He helped draft the language that created the Senate Select Committee on Intelligence.

In April 1981, Turner co-founded the Center for National Security Law with John Norton Moore. He also took a leave of absence to become the Special Assistant to the Undersecretary of Defense for Policy as well as Counsel to the President's Intelligence Oversight Board, where he served for two years. Then he served as Principal Deputy Assistant Secretary for Legislative and Governmental Affairs for the United States Department of State until 1985. Turner served from 1986 to 1987 as the first President and CEO of the United States Institute of Peace.

Two years later, he began the first of three terms as the chair of the American Bar Association Standing Committee on Law and National Security. He held the post until 1992. He also served as editor of the ABA National Security Law Report. In 1991, Turner co-edited and published National Security Law and Policy. At the time of its creation, the field of national security law did not exist as a separate discipline in the legal profession.

In 1994, he received a one-year appointment to the U.S. Naval War College and became the Charles H. Stockton Professor of International Law. That same year, he was described in a Michigan Law Review article as one of the "two most distinguished and careful commentators" in the area of the law and the Vietnam War.

In 2000, Turner chaired a study investigating the paternity of Sally Hemings' children. The project concluded that the most likely father was Thomas Jefferson's younger brother, Randolph Jefferson. In his 2012 book Master of the Mountain, Henry Wiencek described Turner as "[Thomas] Jefferson's chief scholarly defender".

== Honors and recognition ==
- Member, Board of Directors, Thomas Jefferson Institute for Public Policy (1996–present)

== Books ==
- Turner, Robert F. (1975). Vietnamese Communism: Its Origins and Development (1st ed.). Stanford, CA: Hoover Institution Press. ISBN 9780817964313.
- Turner, Robert F. (1983). The war powers resolution : its implementation in theory and practice. Philadelphia, Penn.: Foreign Policy Research Inst. ISBN 978-0910191067.
- Moore, John Norton; Turner, Robert F.; Management, United States President's Blue Ribbon Commission on Defense (1986). The legal structure of Defense organization: memorandum. The Commission.
- Turner, Robert F. (1987). Nicaragua v. United States: A Look at the Facts. Cambridge, MA: Institute for Foreign Policy Analysis, Inc. ISBN 0-08-034499-2.
- Moore, John Norton; Turner, Robert F. (1987). International Law and the Brezhnev Doctrine. Charlottesville, VA: The Center for National Security Law. ISBN 978-0819157959.
- Turner, Robert F. (1991). Repealing the War Powers Resolution : restoring the rule of law in U.S. foreign policy. Washington: Brassey's. ISBN 978-0080374352. "Robert F. Turner."
- Moore, John Norton; Turner, Robert F. (1995). Readings on international law from the Naval War College review, 1978-1994. Newport, RI: Naval War College.
- Turner, Robert F. (1999). The ABM Treaty and the Senate. Charlottesville, VA: Center for National Security Law. ISBN 0-917193-01-6.
- Moore, John Norton; Turner, Robert F. (2002). Real Lessons of the Vietnam War: Reflections Twenty-Five Years After the Fall of Saigon (1st ed.). Durham, North Carolina: Carolina Academic Press. ISBN 0-89089-648-8.
- Moore, John Norton; Roberts, Guy B.; Turner, Robert F. (2005). National Security Law Documents (2nd ed.). Durhan, North Carolina: Carolina Academic Press. ISBN 978-1611637045.
- Fischer, Ross A.; Moore, John Norton; Turner, Robert F. (2006). To Oppose Any Foe: The Legacy of U.S. Intervention in Vietnam. Durhan, North Carolina: Carolina Academic Press. ISBN 1-59460-206-9.
- Moore, John Norton; Turner, Robert F. (2010). Legal Issues in the Struggle Against Terror. Durham, North Carolina: Carolina Academic Press. ISBN 978-1-59460-830-8.
- Matter, Scholars Commission on the Jefferson-Hemings (2011). The Jefferson-Hemings Controversy: Report of the Scholars Commission. Durham, North Carolina: Carolina Academic Press. ISBN 9780890890851.
- Moore, John Norton; Roberts, Guy B.; Turner, Robert F. (2015). National Security Law & Policy (3rd ed.). Durham, North Carolina: Carolina Academic Press. ISBN 978-1611637045.
