= Brigadier General Robert L. Denig Memorial Distinguished Performance Award =

The Brigadier General Robert L. Denig Memorial Distinguished Performance Award is presented annually by the United States Marine Corps Combat Correspondents Association. It is named for the Marine Corps' first Director of Public Information, Brigadier General Robert L. Denig.

The award is made to civilians who have made an especially significant contribution to the perpetuation of the ideals, traditions, stature and achievements of the United States Marine Corps.

== Award recipients ==
- 2016 Col. John “Doc” Church
- 2015 Georgette Louise “Dickey” Chapelle
- 2014
- 2013 Francis “Bing” West
- 2012 Dr. Linda Canup Keaton-Lima
- 2011 Charles “Chip” Jones
- 2010 Tom Hanks
- 2009 Col. John Grider Miller (USMC Ret.)
- 2008 James “Jim” Brady
- 2007 James “Jim” Lehrer
- 2006 Walter Ford
- 2001 Joseph L. Galloway
- 2000 James Bradley
