= Joseph H. Alexander =

United States Marine Corps officer and military historian (1938–2014)

- Born: Joseph Hammond Alexander; January 24, 1938; Charlotte, North Carolina, U.S.
- Died: September 28, 2014 (aged 76); Asheville, North Carolina, U.S.
- Writing career
- Subject: Military history

Joseph Hammond Alexander (January 24, 1938 – September 28, 2014) was a Colonel of the United States Marine Corps and historian.

== Education ==
Alexander obtained master's degrees in history and national defense from North Carolina, Georgetown and Jacksonville Universities.

He also graduated with distinction from the Naval War College.

== Military career ==
Alexander served in the Marine Corps for 29 years. He had been in command of a company during his time in Vietnam and then a battalion in Okinawa. He later served in amphibious task forces on ships at sea for five years.

By the time of his retirement he reached the rank of colonel and served as chief of staff of the 3rd Marine Division in the western Pacific.

== Post-Military ==
When Alexander retired, he began a whole new career as a military history writer. He worked with Lou Reda Productions as chief historian and scriptwriter for their documentaries, which were aired on the History Channel of the Arts and Entertainment Network. He resided in Asheville, North Carolina.

He was a member of the board of Habitat for Humanity and volunteered as a home builder.

He died at the age of 76 in Asheville, North Carolina on September 28, 2014.

== Selected publications ==
- Across the Reef
- Battle of the Barricades: U.S. Marines in the recapture of Seoul OCLC 48015171
- Edson's Raiders: The 1st Marine Raider Battalion in World War II ISBN 1557500207 OCLC 44764056
- A Fellowship of Valor: The History of the United States Marines ISBN 0060182660 OCLC 36768068
- Fleet operations in a mobile war: September 1950-June 1951 ISBN 0945274459 OCLC 47100999
- Storm Landings: Epic Amphibious Battles in the Central Pacific ISBN 1557500320 OCLC 36135875
- Sea Soldiers in the Cold War: Amphibious Warfare 1945-1991 ISBN 155750055X OCLC 30594615
- Utmost Savagery: The Three Days of Tarawa ISBN 1557500312 OCLC 32349301

== Awards ==
- Naval Institute Author of the Year in 1996
- Naval History Author of the Year in 2010
- Theodore And Franklin D. Roosevelt Prize In Naval History in 1995
