= Jane Dalton =

Botanical book collector and translator

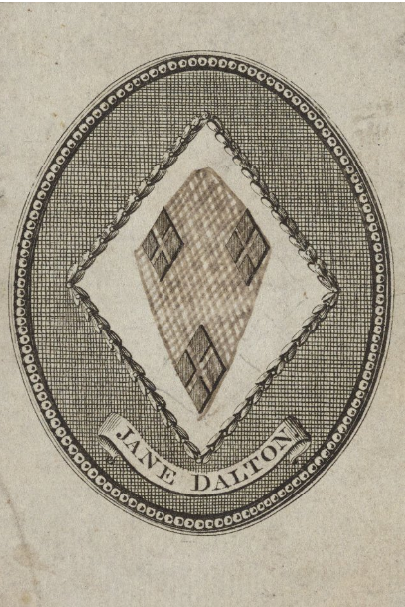
Bookplate of Jane Dalton, which appears in 270 of her books in the Malthus Collection.

Jane Dalton (1742 – 10 December 1817) was an English collector of botanical books and a translator.

== Early life ==
Her father was Richard Dalton. At some point before 1766, she became the ward of her first cousin Daniel Malthus, father of Thomas Robert Malthus, and lived with that household at The Rookery, Westcott, until 1768, participating in its learned discussions.

In 1773 she was described in a poem by Richard Graves in the character of "Delia":

Whilst sprightly Delia cheers her friends,
(Not with wise comments on the weather,
Or hints of "who and who's together",
But) with remarks on books profound,
Or anecdotes of the gay monde...
Whilst some amid' the studious quire
Touch the guitar or tune the lyre;
With dedal skill whilst Delia weaves
In threads of gold the mimic leaves;
Or decks with flow'rs the Brussels lace
To veil the beauties of her face.

== Translation work ==
In 1788, she lived in Paris, corresponding with Jacques-Henri Bernardin de Saint-Pierre, who was director of the Paris Botanical Gardens. She translated Bernadin de Saint-Pierre’s novel Paul et Virginie into English, publishing it as Paul and Mary: An Indian Story in 1789, anonymously and for no fee. She has also been proposed as the translator of An Essay on Landscape, a translation of La composition des paysages by Rousseau's pupil René de Girardin. Her talent for landscape design was noted by a contemporary: "Everyone consulted her when they had gardens to improve."

== Book collection ==
Daniel Mathers described her as "a botanist to the death" and, when he died in 1800, left her "all my botanical books in which the name of Rousseau is written" – that is, from Jean-Jacques Rousseau’s personal library. In total, 271 volumes bearing her bookplate, containing 311 separate works, make up part of the Malthus Collection at Old Library, Jesus College.
