= The Bluejacket's Manual =

Handbook published by the United States Naval Institute

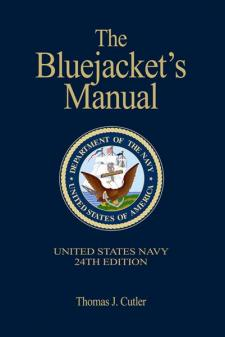
- 24th Edition Hardcover
- Author: Thomas J. Cutler, Mark T. Hacala, and Paul A. Kingsbury
- Language: English
- Subject: United States Navy life
- Genre: Handbook
- Publisher: United States Naval Institute Press
- Publication date: 12 Apr 2023 (26th Edition)
- Publication place: U.S.
- Media type: Print
- Pages: 712 (Hardcover 26th edition)
- ISBN: 978-1-68247-843-1 (Hardcover 26th edition)
- Preceded by: 25th Edition (2015)

The Bluejacket's Manual is the basic handbook for United States Navy personnel. First issued in 1902 to teach recruits about naval procedures and life and offer a reference for active sailors, it has become the "bible" for Navy personnel, providing information about a wide range of Navy topics. The current edition is the 26th, published in 2023.

== History ==
Before 1902, Seamanship, published in 1863 by LCDR Stephen B. Luce was one of the primary sources for training midshipmen at United States Naval Academy.

1902 saw the first publication of The Bluejacket's Manual, written by Lieutenant Ridley McLean, as well as the Recruit's Handy Book. Every enlistee received the latter, and by World War I, both were being issued to every recruit. The Handy Book was discontinued in the 1920s.

Some manuals published between 1903 and early 1915 have inconsistent edition numbering. The 1903, 1905, 1907, and 1908 were considered the 2nd, 3rd, 4th, and 5th editions by the authors and the Naval Institute. In 1914, Franklin Publishing was contracted to publish the 1914 and 1915 book and pamphlet manuals. Because 1914 was the first time Franklin published the manual, they published their edition as the First Edition, the early 1915 version as the 2nd, and the late 1915 one as the 3rd. A single numbering system was restored with the 3rd edition, late 1915 Manual.

=== Centennial Edition ===
The 2002 Centennial Edition (23rd edition), saw several modifications, including a reversion to its original title: Bluejacket's. The "Navy Education and Training" chapter was expanded, and the "Naval Missions and Heritage" chapter was added.

The current (26th) edition's authors are retired Lieutenant Commander Thomas J. Cutler, retired Master Chief Mark T. Hacala, and retired Fleet Master Chief Paul A. Kingsbury.

=== Early editions ===
Bluejacket's Manual Editions by Year
Year	Edition	Printing	Author	Foreword/Intro	Publisher	Printer	Dated	ISBN/OCLC	Pages	Binding
1902	1st	1st	LT Ridley McLean	William H. Moody	USNI	USNI	1902	OCLC 2548907	304	Envelope
1902 (reprint)	1st	Reprint	LT Ridley McLean	William H. Moody	USNI	USNI	1978 E.L. Beach	ISBN 0870211072	304	Envelope
1903	2nd	1st	LT Ridley McLean	William H. Moody	USNI	Lord Baltimore Press	1903 P.R. Alger	None	391	Envelope
1904	2nd	1st	LT Ridley McLean	William H. Moody	USNI	Lord Baltimore Press	1904 P.R. Alger	None	391	Envelope
1905	2nd	1st	LT Ridley McLean	William H. Moody	USNI	Lord Baltimore Press	1905 P.R. Alger	None	391	Envelope
1907	2nd	1st	LT Ridley McLean	William H. Moody	USNI	Lord Baltimore Press	1907 P.R. Alger	None	391	Book
1908	2nd	1st	LT Ridley McLean	William H. Moody	USNI	Lord Baltimore Press	1908 P.R. Alger	None	407	Book
1911	2nd	1st	LT Ridley McLean	William H. Moody	USNI	Lord Baltimore Press	1911 P.R. Alger	None	407	Envelope
1911	2nd	2nd	LT Ridley McLean	William H. Moody	USNI	Lord Baltimore Press	1911 P.R. Alger	None	407	Book
1913	2nd	1st	LT Ridley McLean	William H. Moody	USNI	Lord Baltimore Press	1913 R. Earle	None	407	Envelope
1913	2nd	2nd	LT Ridley McLean	William H. Moody	USNI	Lord Baltimore Press	1913 E.J. King	None	407	Book

=== Later editions ===
Bluejacket's Manual Editions by Year
Year	Edition	Printing	Author	Forward/Intro	Publisher	Printer	Dated	ISBN/OCLC	Pages	Binding
1914	1st	1st (5 parts/1 vol.)	None	Josephus Daniel	USNI	Franklin Printing	None Listed	None	849	Book
1915	2nd	1st (5 parts/1 vol.)	None	Josephus Daniel	USNI	Franklin Printing	None Listed	None	849	Book
1915	2nd	1st (Book 1/pt. 1)	None	Josephus Daniel	USNI	Franklin Printing	None Listed	None	222	Book 1/4
1915	2nd	1st (Book 2/pt. 2)	None	Josephus Daniel	USNI	Franklin Printing	None Listed	None	247	Book 2/4
1915	2nd	1st (Book 3/pt. 3)	None	Josephus Daniel	USNI	Franklin Printing	None Listed	None	274	Book 3/4
1915	2nd	1st (Book 3/pt. 4)	None	Josephus Daniel	USNI	Franklin Printing	None Listed	None	74	Book 3/4
1915	2nd	1st (Book 4/pt. 5)	None	Josephus Daniel	USNI	Franklin Printing	None Listed	None	47	Book 4/4
1915	3rd	1st (5 parts/1 vol.)	None	Josephus Daniel	USNI	Franklin Printing	None Listed	None	879	Book
1916	4th	1st	None	Josephus Daniel	USNI	Franklin Printing	Mar 1916	None	845	Book
1917	4th	1st	None	Josephus Daniel	USNI	Franklin Printing	Mar 1916	None	845	Book
1917	5th	1st	LT Norman Van Der Veer	Josephus Daniel	USNI	Franklin Printing	Nov 1916	None	845	Book
1917	5th	1st	LT Norman Van Der Veer	Josephus Daniel	Military Publishing Co.	Military Publishing Co.	Nov 1916	OCLC 14201704	845	Book
1918	5th	1st	LT Norman Van Der Veer	Josephus Daniel	USNI	Franklin Printing	Nov 1916	None	845	Book
1918	6th	1st	LT Norman Van Der Veer	Josephus Daniel	Edwin Appleton	Edwin Appleton	1918	OCLC 317209669	850	Hardcover
1918	6th	1st	LT Norman Van Der Veer	Josephus Daniel	Military Publishing Co.	Military Publishing Co.	1918	OCLC 8137959	821	Hardcover
1922	6th	1st	CDR C.C. Soule	Edwin Denby	Gvmt Printing Office	Gvmt Printing Office	Sep 1922	None	518	Hardcover
1922	6th	2nd	CDR C.C. Soule	Edwin Denby	Gvmt Printing Office	Gvmt Printing Office	1924	None	518	Hardcover
1927	7th	1st	None	Curtis D. Wilbur	Gvmt Printing Office	Gvmt Printing Office	May 1927	None	958	Hardcover
1927	7th	2nd	None	Curtis D. Wilbur	Gvmt Printing Office	Gvmt Printing Office	1928	None	958	Hardcover
1938	8th	1st	None	William Leahy	USNI	USNI	Mar 1938	None	836	Hardcover
1938	8th	2nd	None	William Leahy	USNI	USNI	May 1938	None	836	Hardcover
1938	8th	3rd	None	William Leahy	USNI	USNI	June 1938	None	836	Hardcover
1939	9th	4th (Rev. 8th edition)	None	G.V. Stewart	USNI	USNI	Mar 1939	None	834	Semi-hardcover

=== WWII Editions ===
Bluejacket's Manual Editions by Year
Year	Edition	Printings	Author	Forward/Intro	Publisher	Printer	Dated	ISBN/OCLC	Pages	Binding
1940	10th	5	None	G.V. Stewart	USNI	USNI	1940–43	OCLC 560958256	784	Hardcover
1943	11th	7	None	A.T. Church	USNI	USNI	1943–44	OCLC 155725915	1145	Hardcover
1944	12th	1	None	A.T. Church	USNI	USNI	1944	OCLC 9358944	585	Hardcover

=== Post-war editions ===
Bluejacket's Manual Editions by Year
Year	Edition	Printings	Author	Forward/Intro	Publisher	Printer	Dated	ISBN/OCLC	Pages	Binding
1946	13th	3	LT Charles Ross	A.T. Church	USNI	USNI	1947–48	OCLC 801977902	622	Hardcover
1950	14th	27	None	Hon. Francis Matthews / J.W. Roper	USNI	USNI	1950–57	OCLC 3032167	828	Semi-hardcover
1957	15th	7	CAPT John V. Noel	VADM James Holloway	USNI	USNI	1957–59	OCLC 20269963	647	Semi-hardcover
1960	16th	4	CAPT John V. Noel	VADM W.R. Smedberg III	USNI	USNI	1960–62	OCLC 17452212	641	Semi-hardcover
1963	17th	6	CAPT John V. Noel	VADM W.R. Smedberg III	USNI	USNI	1963–66	OCLC 11142117	684	Semi-hardcover
1968	18th	3	None	MCPON Delbert Black	USNI	USNI	1968–69	OCLC 1468065	756	Hard or softcover
1973	19th	8	LCDR Arnold S. Lott	MCPON Robert J. Walker	USNI	USNI	1973–77	ISBN 0870211099	644	Softcover
1978	20th	21	Bill Bearden	MCPON Thomas S. Crow / MCPON W.H. Plackett	USNI	USNI	1978–89	ISBN 0870211129	611	Hard or softcover
1990	21st	9	Bill Bearden	MCPON John Hagan / MCPON Duane Bushey	USNI	USNI	1990–96	ISBN 0870212591	771	Hard or softcover
1998	22nd		LCDR Thomas J. Cutler	MCPON Jim Herdt	USNI	USNI	1998	ISBN 1557500649	643	Hard or softcover
2002	23rd		LCDR Thomas J. Cutler	MCPON John Hagan	USNI	USNI	2002	ISBN 1557502218	648	Hardcover
2009	24th		LCDR Thomas J. Cutler	MCPON Joe R. Campa, Jr.	USNI	USNI	2009	ISBN 1591141532	694	Hardcover
2015	25th		LCDR Thomas J. Cutler		USNI	USNI	2017	ISBN 1612519741	784	Hardcover
2023	26th		LCDR Thomas J. Cutler, USN (Ret); MCPO Mark T. Hacala, USN (Ret); MCPO Paul A. Kingsbury, USN (Ret)		USNI	USNI	2023	ISBN 1682478432	712	Hardcover
