= Yoram Dinstein =

Israeli legal scholar (1936–2024)

- יורם דינשטיין
- Born: 2 January 1936; Tel Aviv, Mandatory Palestine
- Died: 10 February 2024 (aged 88)
- Education: J.D. from New York University Law School
- Employer: Tel Aviv University
- Known for: International law specialist; authority on the laws of war; former President and Dean of Law at Tel Aviv University.
- Notable work: The Conduct of Hostilities Under the Law of International Armed Conflict (2nd ed., 2010); The International Law of Belligerent Occupation, (2009); War, Aggression and Self-Defence (4th ed., 2005)
- Title: Professor Emeritus
- Awards: Israel Prize (2023)

Yoram Dinstein (Hebrew: יורם דינשטיין; 2 January 1936 – 10 February 2024) was an Israeli scholar and professor emeritus at Tel Aviv University. He was a specialist on international law and an authority on the laws of war. He served as President of Tel Aviv University from 1991 to 1998 and won the 2023 Israel Prize for law research.

== Biography ==
Yoram Dinstein was born in Tel Aviv on 2 January 1936. He received his legal education from Hebrew University of Jerusalem, where he graduated summa cum laude, and New York University Law School. Dinstein died on 10 February 2024, at the age of 88.

== Legal and academic career ==
Dinstein began teaching at the Hebrew University in 1964. From 1966 to 1970, he was a member of the Israeli delegation to the United Nations and the Israeli Consul-General in New York City.

Dinstein was Dean of the Faculty Law at Tel Aviv University from 1978 to 1980. From 1980 to 1985 he was the Rector of Tel Aviv University (1980–85), and he served as its president from 1991 to 1998 (following Moshe Many, and succeeded by Itamar Rabinovich).

Dinstein served twice as the Charles H. Stockton Professor of International Law at the U.S. Naval War College in Newport, Rhode Island, from 1999 to 2000 and again from 2002 to 2003. He was also a Humboldt Fellow at the Max Planck Institute for Comparative Public Law and International Law in Heidelberg, Germany, a Meltzer Visiting professor of law at New York University, and a visiting professor of law at the University of Toronto.

Dinstein was President of Israel's national branch of the International Law Association and of the Israel United Nations Association. He served as Chairman of the Israel national branch of Amnesty International and as a member of the Executive Council of the American Society of International Law. He was a member of the Council of the San Remo International Institute of Humanitarian Law. He was the founder and Editor of the Israel Yearbook on Human Rights (40 volumes of which have been issued – in English – since 1971).

Dinstein wrote on international law, human rights, and the laws of armed conflict.

=== Israel's chapter of Amnesty International ===
Yoram Dinstein headed Israel's chapter of Amnesty International from 1974 to 1976. During this time, Dinstein received money from the Israeli Foreign Ministry. Dinstein also told the Israeli Foreign Ministry about the internal activities and contacts of Amnesty International. This has led Neve Gordon and Nicola Perugini to characterize Dinstein as an Israeli "spy" within Amnesty International. Dinstein used his position as "chairman of the Israel national section of Amnesty" to criticize the work of Felicia Langer, a lawyer who was advocating for rights of Palestinians in Israeli courts.

Dinstein later said Amnesty International was "a populist organization very far from everything I believe in".

== Notable opinions ==
=== Self-defense ===
Yoram Dinstein maintained that use of force in self-defence (under international law) was only permitted in response to an armed attack, or the "imminence of an armed attack". In order to reconcile Israel's surprise attack on Egypt in 1967 with his own stringent criteria for self-defence, he writes that "Egypt was bent on an armed attack, and the sole question was not whether war would materialize but when." Norman Finkelstein argues Dinstein's position is contradictory: "if, except for an armed attack, the only situation allowing for resort to force in self-defense is the "imminence" of a strike, wouldn't the "sole question" of "when" Egypt was planning to attack be critical?" Finkelstein also writes that Dinstein based his opinion on a single article from the 1970s, and ignored "voluminous" historical records that show Egypt was not about to attack Israel, nor did Israeli leaders believe an attack was imminent.

=== Targeted killings ===
In 2004, the issue of targeted killings of suspected Palestinian militants went before the Israeli supreme court. Critics argued that while it is legitimate to kill suspected terrorists while they pose a threat, many Israeli targeted killings happened when the suspected militants were sleeping at home or engaged in other activities that did not endanger anyone. Dinstein argued Israeli targeted killings were "almost always legitimate".

Regarding Israeli settlements, Dinstein argued they were only illegal under the Fourth Geneva Convention when they benefit from government subsidies or coordination, but that when Israeli settlers act on their own initiative without government help, then such settlements do not violate the Geneva Convention.

== Published works ==
=== Books ===
- The Conduct of Hostilities Under the Law of International Armed Conflict, ISBN 0521198135, Cambridge University Press (2nd ed., 2010)
- The International Law of Belligerent Occupation, Cambridge University Press, ISBN 0-521-72094-X (2009)
- War, Aggression and Self-Defence, Cambridge University Press, ISBN 0-521-79758-6 (4th ed., 2005) (5th ed., 2011)
- War crimes in international law, co-editor with Mala Tabory, Martinus Nijhoff Publishers, ISBN 90-411-0237-X (1996)
- Freedom of Religion and the Protection of Religious Minorities, The Jacob Blaustein Institute for the Advancement of Human Rights (1991)
- The Release of Prisoners of War, International Committee of the Red Cross (1984)
- Models of Autonomy, Transaction Publishers, ISBN 0-87855-435-1 (1981)
- The Laws of War at Sea, (1980)
- The Defence of "Obedience to Superior Orders" in International Law, A. W. Sijthoff (1965)

=== Articles ===
- "Air and Missile Warfare Under International Humanitarian Law", The Military Law and the Law of War Review. (2013)
- "Comments on Protocol I, International Review of the Red Cross (2010)
- "War, Aggression and Self-Defence", Commonwealth Law Bulletin, Volume 32, Issue 4 (December 2006)
- "Comments on War", Harvard Journal of Law and Public Policy (2003)
- "The Parameters and Context of International Criminal Law", Touro Journal of Transnational Law (1988)
- "International Criminal Law", The Israel Law Review (1985)
- "Oil pollution by ships and freedom of the high seas", Journal of Maritime Law & Com. (1971)
