= Leo Gross =

American lawyer

- Born: April 6, 1903; Krosno, Galicia
- Died: November 8, 1990 (aged 87); Cambridge, Massachusetts

Education
- Education: Harvard University; University of Vienna

Philosophical work
- Institutions: Columbia University; Tufts University; London School of Economics; University of Cologne
- Main interests: international law, international relations
- Notable ideas: significance of Peace of Westphalia

Leo Gross (April 6, 1903 in Krosno, Galicia - November 8, 1990 in Cambridge, Massachusetts) was an Austrian - American lawyer of Jewish descent. He was a scholar in the area of international law and international relations and from 1944 to 1980 a professor at the Fletcher School of Law and Diplomacy of Tufts University.

Gross was born in 1903 in the town of Krosno in Galicia, then in Austria-Hungary, and graduated from the University of Vienna to study political science, international law and economy. He pursued his doctoral studies under Hans Kelsen until 1927. From 1929 to 1931, with a grant from the Rockefeller Foundation, he studied in the field of law and legal philosophy at the London School of Economics (LSE), at Columbia University and at Harvard University, where he was awarded a doctorate in the field of law in 1931. He then returned to Europe and worked as a research assistant to Kelsen at the University of Cologne.

After the seizure of power by the National Socialists, Kelsen was suspended from his professorship in Cologne because of his Jewish ancestry and emigrated to Switzerland in April 1933. On Kelsen's recommendation Gross then worked again at the LSE where he worked as an assistant to Hersch Lauterpacht. Two years later, he moved to the Paris-based International Institute of Intellectual Co-operation, an arm of the League of Nations. There, he worked as a manager of the Department of International Relations until 1940, when he emigrated to the United States via Vichy, Pau, Madrid and Lisbon because of the start of World War II.

In 1941 he was employed in the US and three years later, was hired as a professor of international law at the Fletcher School of Law and Diplomacy of Tufts University, where he remained until his retirement in 1980. In addition, in various years throughout his career, he taught as Fulbright professor at the University of Copenhagen, at the University of Tokyo, and at Hitotsubashi University. As the guest professor he also taught at Yale University, Harvard University, Columbia University and the Hague Academy of International Law. He was also an adviser to the U.S. State Department and the United Nations.

His jurisprudential interaction focused on the United Nations and the International Court of Justice. He was married to a Viennese artist, Gerda Fried, who gave birth to twin daughters Elisabeth and Marilyn in the United States. He died in 1990 in Cambridge, Massachusetts of pneumonia. His estate is located in the German Exile Archive in the German National Library at Frankfurt.

== Awards and recognition ==
Gross served on the board of the American Society of International Law from 1956 until 1959. He was appointed honorary vice president in 1970, was awarded an ASIL Certificate of Merit in 1977 for his work The Future of the International Court of Justice, and received the ASIL's highest award, the Manley O. Hudson Medal, in 1986. Furthermore, in 1970 Gross became honorary publisher of the American Journal of International Law for which he had served as co-publisher from 1956 until 1970 and as book review editor from 1958 until 1985. He became a member of the American Academy of Arts and Sciences in 1958 and an honorary member of the Indian Society of International Law in 1964.
