= Howard S. Levie =

Howard Sidney Levie (19 December 1907 – 19 April 2009) was one of America's foremost legal experts on the law of war and the key draftsman of the Korean Armistice Agreement.

== Early life and education ==
Levie was born in Wolverine, Michigan and grew up in Baltimore, Maryland and New York City. He earned his Bachelor of Arts and Juris Doctor degrees from Cornell University and a Master of Laws degree from George Washington University. He also studied at the Sorbonne in Paris and The Hague Academy of International Law in The Netherlands.

== Professional career ==
A veteran of World War II and the Korean War, Levie served in New Guinea and the Philippines, in post-war Japan, and in Korea. He provided legal reviews of Japanese war crime trials for General Douglas MacArthur. He was assigned to the Staff of the United Nations Command Armistice Delegation when he drafted the Korean Armistice Agreement. A member of the US Army Judge Advocate General's Corps, Levie was the first Chief of the Army JAG Corps' International Affairs Division at the Pentagon. Other assignments included postings in Italy, France, Fort Leavenworth, Kansas and the Presidio of San Francisco. He retired in 1963 in the rank of Colonel.

In September 1963 he joined the faculty of Saint Louis University School of Law. While there, Levie authored over 20 articles on a broad spectrum of law of war topics. It was also during this tenure that he spent a sabbatical year at the Naval War College as the Charles H. Stockton Professor of International Law. He retired from Saint Louis University in 1977 having attained Professor Emeritus of Law status, and returned to Rhode Island where he resumed his association with the Naval War College as a lecturer on the 1949 Geneva Conventions and the laws of war. In October 1994, his enormous contribution to the College was formally recognized with the establishment of the Howard S. Levie Military Chair of Operational Law.

On the occasion of his 100th birthday, Levie was awarded the prestigious Morris I. Leibman Award by the American Bar Association's Standing Committee on National Security Law. The award citation noted that his career as a soldier and a scholar spanned more than six decades and was marked by distinction throughout. It concluded, "The impact of [his] enormous body of work on the thinking of domestic and international policy makers, military commanders and scholars cannot be overstated."

In 1998, the U.S. Naval War College in Newport, Rhode Island published Levie on the Law of War to honor Levie and to recognize the enormous impact of his writings on the law applicable during armed conflict. In the book's foreword, Professor Emeritus Richard J. Grunawalt of the Naval War College observed:

Once in a great while, someone comes along who makes a significant and lasting contribution to his or her chosen profession, a contribution that comes to define the paradigm of that calling. With respect to the development and articulation of the law of war, Professor Howard Levie is just such an individual.

Levie was an honorary member of the Artillery Company of Newport.

Levie died in April 2009, at the age of 101, in Portsmouth, Rhode Island.

== Published works ==
Soldier and scholar, Levie left a legacy of scholarly excellence in the development and study of the law of war. Having authored 10 books (several of them multi-volume works) and over 80 articles, he was internationally recognized as an authority on matters ranging from the treatment of prisoners of war to the legality of conventional and nuclear, chemical, biological weapons; from war crimes and terrorism to the protection of the victims of armed conflict. Among the books he authored are

- Prisoners of War in International Armed Conflict
- The Code of International Armed Conflict
- Terrorism in War: The Law of War Crimes.
- Terrorism: Documents of International and Local Control, edited by Howard S. Levie.
