= Michael N. Schmitt =

American international law scholar

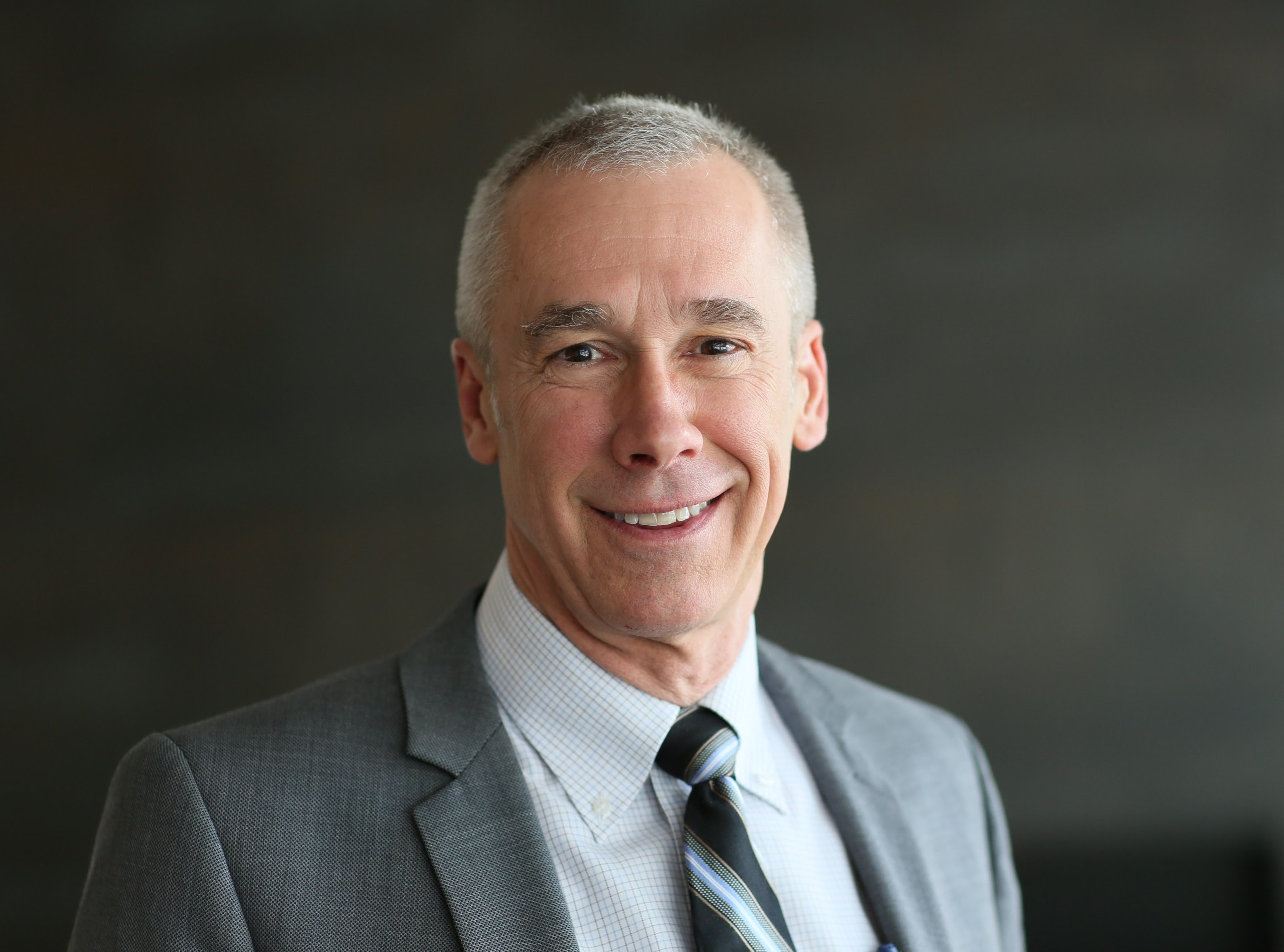
- Schmitt in 2016
- Education: D.Litt., Durham University
- Employer: University of Reading
- Title: Professor of International Law

Michael N. Schmitt is an American international law scholar specializing in international humanitarian law, use of force issues, and the international law applicable to cyberspace. He is Professor of Public International Law at the University of Reading, the G. Norman Lieber Distinguished Scholar at the Lieber Institute of the United States Military Academy at West Point, and the Charles H. Stockton Distinguished Scholar in Residence at the US Naval War College.

== Education ==
He has a D.Litt. from Durham University; LL.M. from Yale Law School; JD from the University of Texas Law School; MA from the Naval War College; and an MA and BA from Texas State University.

== Career ==
From 1979–99, Schmitt served in the United States Air Force as a judge advocate. He graduated first in class from the Naval War College in 1996, and his operational law experience includes service in both Operation Provide Comfort and Operation Northern Watch. In 1999, he was appointed Professor of International Law at the George C. Marshall European Center for Security Studies in Garmisch, Germany, eventually becoming Dean. He was subsequently Chair of Public International Law at Durham University and at the University of Exeter. He returned to the Naval War College as Chairman of the Stockton Center and Charles H. Stockton Professor of International Law in 2011. Schmitt retired from the Naval War College in 2019 and is now Professor Emeritus at the institution. In 2020, he joined the faculty of the University of Reading School of Law. In addition to his position at the University of Reading, he is G. Norman Lieberman Distinguished Scholar at West Point, Strauss Center Distinguished Scholar and Visiting Professor of Law at the University of Texas, Charles H. Stockton Distinguished Scholar in Residence at the United States Naval War College's Stockton Center for International Law, and Senior Fellow at the NATO Cooperative Cyber Defence Centre of Excellence. Schmitt serves as General Editor of Oxford University Press' [Lieber Studies] series, and he is Editor Emeritus of International Law Studies, a Fellow of the Royal Society of the Arts and a Member of the Council on Foreign Relations. He sits on the State Department’s Advisory Committee on International Law.

In addition to his academic pursuits, Schmitt serves as Director of Legal Affairs for Cyber Law International, which offers international cyber law capacity-building seminars for government officials around the world. Its programs are sponsored by numerous nations and international organizations and certified as Executive Education by the University of Reading. The firm also engages in cyber law and conflict law consultancy.

== Legal positions ==
Schmitt argued that the Israeli preemptive strike on Iran may have been legal according international law.

In December 2025, Schmitt, Tess Bridgeman and Ryan Goodman co-authored a detailed FAQ in the journal Just Security, in which they argued that the 2025 United States military strikes on alleged drug traffickers were illegal both under the domestic law of the United States and international law.

== International recognition ==
Schmitt is internationally known for his work in directing the 7+ year project leading to publication of the two Tallinn Manuals dealing with the international law applicable to cyberspace. In 2017 he was awarded the Order of the Cross of Terra Mariana by the President of Estonia for his contributions to cyber security. Schmitt is also well known for his work on use of force issues and international humanitarian law. He serves on many boards of publications and professional organizations in these fields.

== Key research activities ==
- Drafting Committee, Harvard University's Manual on the International Law Applicable to Air and Missile Warfare (2003–09)
- Member, Group of International Experts, ICRC Interpretive Guidance on the Notion of Direct Participation in Hostilities (2003–09)
- Director, Tallinn Manual Project(2009-2013)
- Director, Tallinn Manual 2.0 Project (2013-2016)
- Director, Tallinn Manual 3.0 Project (ongoing)
