= United States Naval Institute =

American private non-profit naval military association

- Formation: October 9, 1873; 153 years ago
- Founded at: Annapolis, Maryland
- Type: 501(c)(3) nonprofit organization
- Tax ID no.: 52-1814344
- Headquarters: Annapolis, Maryland
- Products: Proceedings; Naval History
- Members: Over 50,000 (2016)
- Key people: Harry B. Harris Jr. (Chair); Raymond A. Spicer (CEO and Publisher); Peter Pace (Chair of the Naval Institute Foundation); Chip Wallen (CFO)
- Website: www.usni.org

The United States Naval Institute (USNI) is a private non-profit military association that offers independent, nonpartisan forums for debate of national security issues. In addition to publishing magazines and books, the Naval Institute holds several annual conferences. The Naval Institute is based in Annapolis, Maryland.

Established in 1873, the Naval Institute claimed "almost 50,000 members" in 2020, mostly active and retired personnel of the United States Navy, Marine Corps and Coast Guard. The organization also has members in over 90 countries.

The organization has no official or funding ties to the United States Naval Academy or the United States Navy, though it is based on the grounds of the Naval Academy through permission granted by a 1936 Act of Congress.

== History ==
The United States Naval Institute was formed on October 9, 1873, by 15 naval officers gathered at the Naval Academy's Department of Physics and Chemistry building in Annapolis to discuss, among other topics, the implications of a smaller, post-Civil War Navy. Rear Admiral John L. Worden, former commander of the USS Monitor, served as the first president.

In 1874, the Naval Institute began to accept papers and publish the proceedings of its discussions, which were distributed to the organization's members. In 1898, the Naval Institute Press was created to publish basic naval guides. The most popular of these, The Bluejacket's Manual, is on its 26th edition, and is still issued to all enlistees of the United States Navy. The press eventually expanded to publish more general-interest titles in history, biography, and current affairs.

In 1926, the USNI gave $1,000 to help create the Naval Historical Foundation.

In 1992, the Naval Institute Foundation, Inc., was established to stabilize the organization's funding.

In 1999, the Naval Institute transferred its former headquarters, Preble Hall, to the Naval Academy, and renovated a derelict Navy hospital to serve as its new headquarters. The new building was named Beach Hall after Captain Edward L. Beach Jr., author and Navy Cross recipient; and his father, Captain Edward L. Beach Sr., who had served as the institute's secretary-treasurer.

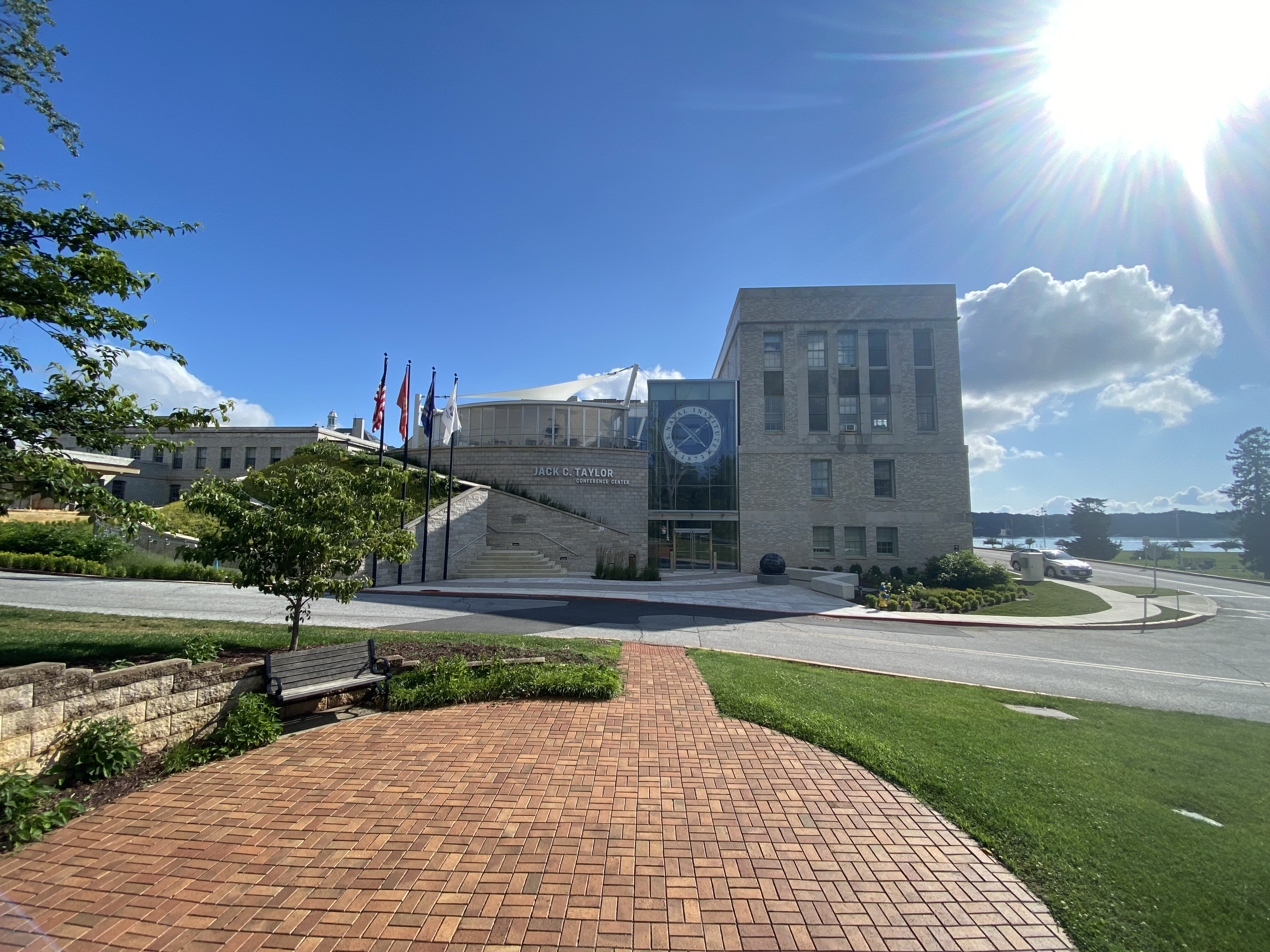
The Jack C. Taylor Conference Center at the Naval Institute in Annapolis, Maryland

On 30 September 2021, the Naval Institute opened a conference center with a 406-seat auditorium, reception spaces, an indoor/outdoor rooftop terrace, five meeting rooms, and a broadcast studio. It is named for Jack C. Taylor, a decorated World War II Navy fighter pilot who founded Enterprise Rent-A-Car.

On 9 October 2023, the USNI celebrated its 150th anniversary with an event held at the Jack C. Taylor Conference Center.

Retired US Navy Vice Admiral Peter H. Daly was the USNI CEO and publisher until the end of November 2023, when US Navy Rear Admiral Raymond Spicer took over the position.

In 2024, the USNI reported revenues of $10,963,609, and total assets of $7,770,195.

== Publications and products ==
=== Proceedings ===
Proceedings is the Naval Institute's monthly magazine. Published since 1874, it is one of the oldest continuously published magazines in the United States. Issues include articles from military professionals and civilian experts, historical essays, book reviews, full-color photography, and reader commentary. Roughly a third are written by active duty and active reserve personnel, a third by retired military, and a third by civilians. Proceedings also frequently carries feature articles by Secretaries of Defense, Secretaries of the Navy, Chairmen of the Joint Chiefs of Staff, and top leaders of the Navy, Marine Corps and Coast Guard. The magazine has published controversial articles on contentious issues; moreover, military officials have been known to block certain articles from being submitted to the journal. For example, in 1962, the Department of Defense blocked a Marine Corps lieutenant colonel from submitting an article to Proceedings about a 1949 proposal to merge the Marines' aviation units into the Air Force.

=== Naval History ===
Naval History is the Naval Institute's bimonthly magazine. First published in 1987, its articles detail the role of sea power in American history. The magazine's contributors have included historians David McCullough and James M. McPherson; former sailors, Marines and Coast Guardsmen such as Ernest Borgnine, Gene Hackman, and Douglas Fairbanks Jr.; and journalists, such as Walter Cronkite and Tom Brokaw.

=== Naval Institute Press ===
The Naval Institute Press was founded in 1898 and publishes about 80 books a year. Its twice-yearly catalog includes works on history, biography, professional military education, and occasional works of popular fiction, such as Tom Clancy's first novel, The Hunt for Red October and Stephen Coonts' Flight of the Intruder. Its professional titles include The Bluejacket's Manual, Naval Shiphandling, The Naval Officer's Guide, The Marine Officer’s Guide, and The Coast Guardsman’s Manual. The Naval Institute Guide to Combat Fleets of the World and The Naval Institute Guide to Ships and Aircraft of the U.S. Fleet are popular reference books with the military, the media, and maritime enthusiasts. Since 1949, the Naval Institute Press has been a member of the Association of University presses. As of 2025, it has 1,500 titles in print. In 2024, the Press published 64 titles; in 2025, 89.

=== USNI News ===
USNI News is the Naval Institute's news service. Founded in 2012, USNI News operates from Monday to Friday and primarily focuses on defense-related topics. USNI News heavily covered the Fat Leonard scandal as it developed. In 2013, USNI News digital service was formally launched.

=== Americans at War ===
In 2007, USNI produced Americans at War, a series of video interviews with American combat veterans of conflicts dating to World War I. Former President George H. W. Bush, Senators Bob Dole, Daniel Inouye, and Bob Kerrey, and others described how combat changed their lives. The series was broadcast on PBS television stations nationwide.

== Archives ==
=== Photographs ===
The Naval Institute holds more than 450,000 images of people, ships and aircraft from all branches of the armed forces. The photographs date from the American Civil War to the present.

=== Oral histories ===
The Naval Institute's oral history program preserves the reminiscences of numerous American military figures, including General Jimmy Doolittle, Admirals Arleigh Burke and Chester W. Nimitz. The Naval Institute records a series of interviews covering the life story of each participant. The interviews are then transcribed, annotated, indexed, and bound. Since the inception of the program in 1969, more than 230 bound volumes have been completed, and interviews have been recorded to produce dozens more.

== Notable members ==
The institute's notable current and former members include:

- Clarence Wade McClusky, Jr, rear admiral
- Thomas Edison, inventor and businessman
- William Halsey Jr., fleet admiral
- John Lehman, former Secretary of the Navy
- John A. Lejeune, United States Marine Corps lieutenant general
- Alfred Thayer Mahan, naval flag officer, geostrategist, and historian
- Chester W. Nimitz, fleet admiral
- Colin Powell, statesman and retired Army general
- Theodore Roosevelt, 26th president of the United States
- Tom Clancy, author

== See also ==
- Air & Space Forces Association
- Association of the United States Army
- Coast Guard Foundation
- Marine Corps Association
- Norman Polmar
- Space Force Association
