= USS Delbert D. Black =

Arleigh Burke-class destroyer

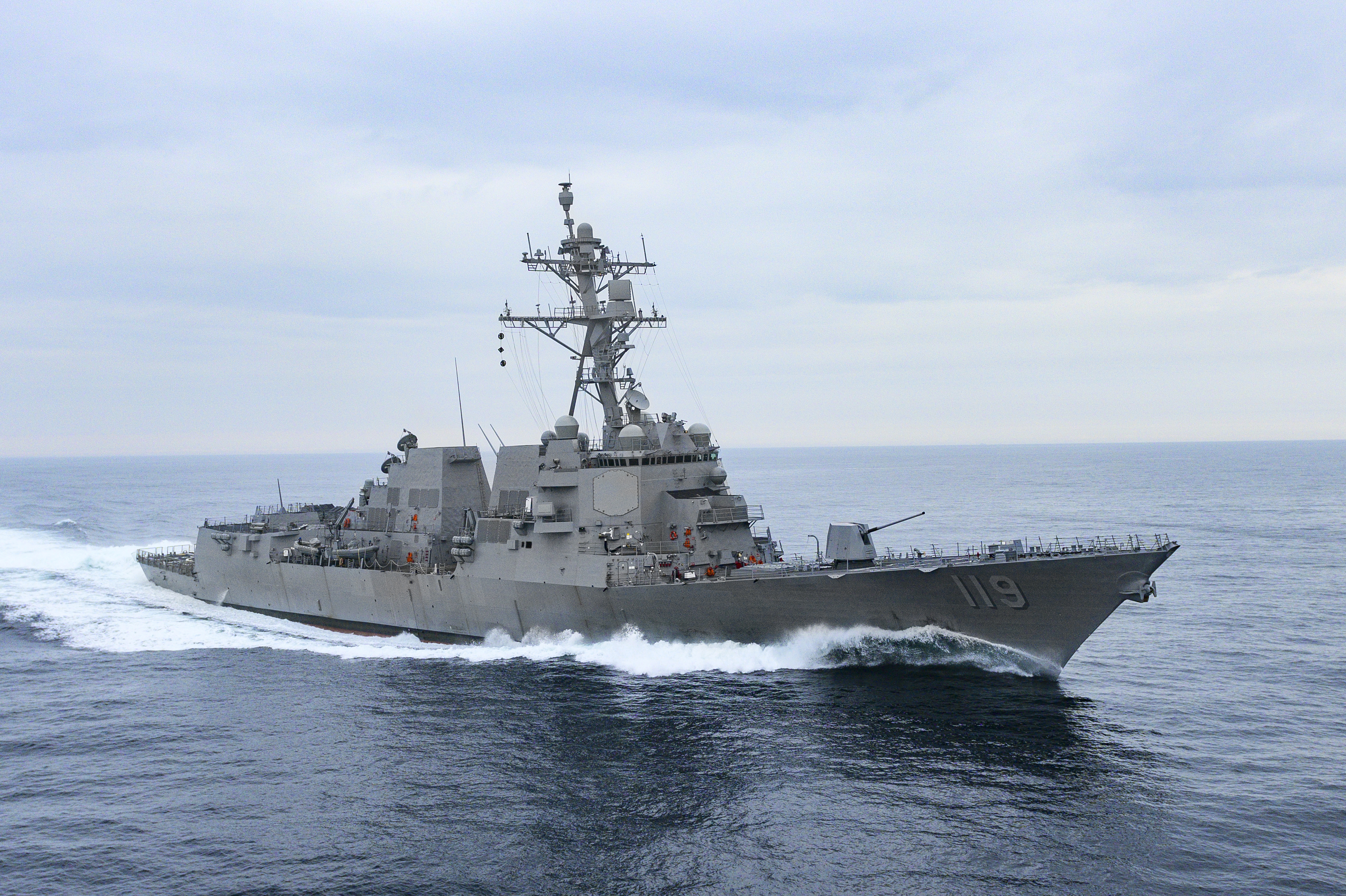
- USS Delbert D. Black on 10 February 2020

History

United States
- Name: Delbert D. Black
- Namesake: Delbert Black
- Awarded: 3 June 2013
- Builder: Ingalls Shipbuilding
- Laid down: 1 June 2016
- Launched: 8 September 2017
- Sponsored by: Ima Jewell Black
- Christened: 4 November 2017
- Acquired: 24 April 2020
- Commissioned: 26 September 2020
- Home port: Mayport
- Identification: Hull number: DDG-119
- Motto: Anchored in Arms
- Status: in active service
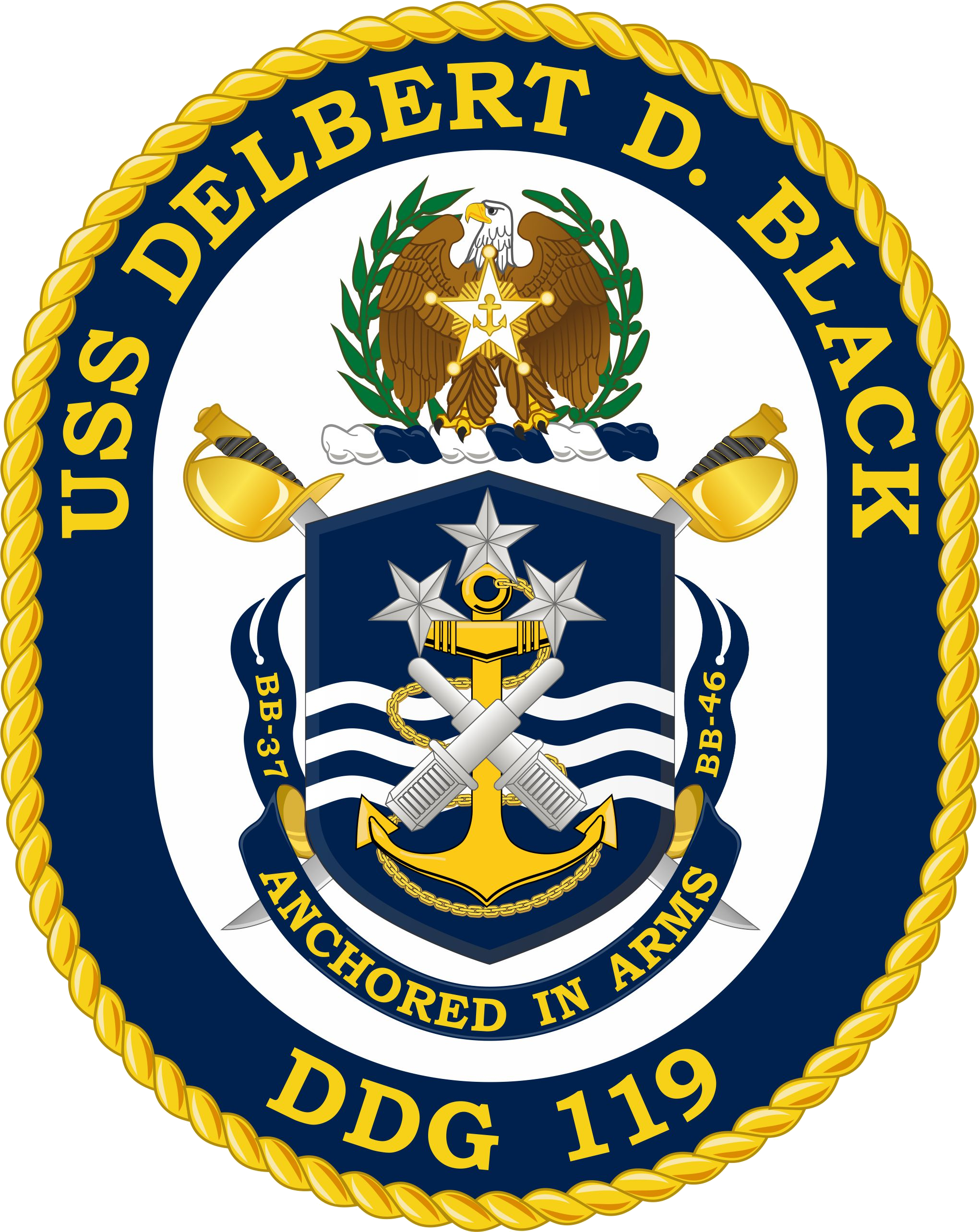
- Badge

General characteristics
- Class & type: Arleigh Burke-class destroyer
- Displacement: 9,200 long tons (9,300 t)
- Length: 513 ft (156 m)
- Draft: 31 ft (9.4 m)
- Propulsion: 4 × General Electric LM2500 gas turbines 100,000 shp (75,000 kW)
- Speed: 31 knots (57 km/h; 36 mph)
- Complement: 330 officers and enlisted
- Armament: Guns: 1 × 5-inch (127 mm)/62 Mk 45 Mod 4 (lightweight gun); 1 × 20 mm (0.8 in) Phalanx CIWS; 2 × 25 mm (0.98 in) Mk 38 machine gun system; 4 × 0.50 in (12.7 mm) caliber guns; Missiles: 1 × 32-cell, 1 × 64-cell (96 total cells) Mk 41 vertical launching system (VLS): RIM-66M surface-to-air missile; RIM-156 surface-to-air missile; RIM-174A Standard ERAM; RIM-161 anti-ballistic missile; RIM-162 ESSM (quad-packed); BGM-109 Tomahawk cruise missile; RUM-139 vertical launch ASROC; Torpedoes: 2 × Mark 32 triple torpedo tubes: Mark 46 lightweight torpedo; Mark 50 lightweight torpedo; Mark 54 lightweight torpedo
- Aircraft carried: 2 × MH-60R Seahawk helicopters
- Aviation facilities: Double hangar and helipad

USS Delbert D. Black (DDG-119) is an Arleigh Burke-class (Flight IIA Technology Insertion) Aegis guided missile destroyer of the United States Navy.

== Etymology ==
She is named in honor of Master Chief Gunner's Mate Delbert Black, the first Master Chief Petty Officer of the Navy (MCPON), who died in 2000. He is remembered for establishing the role of the Navy's senior enlisted leader, and the ship naming is the culmination of a decade of advocacy by MCPONs to honor him with a combatant ship. This is also the first time in decades that a warship has been named for an enlisted person's superior performance and impact, rather than valor or personal sacrifice in combat.

== History ==
Delbert D. Black was launched on 8 September 2017. On 29 March 2019, the ship was damaged at the shipyard when a heavy-lift ship collided with a barge that was alongside the Delbert D. Black. The barge in turn struck the destroyer, resulting in several workers sustaining minor injuries and causing significant damage to the destroyer. The superstructure and hull were both breached and substantial internal spaces were flooded. Damages were estimated to be approximately $10–15 million USD. On 12 March 2020, the ship successfully completed acceptance trials, after spending two days at sea in the Gulf of Mexico.

Delbert D. Black left Mayport on 2 August 2022 for her maiden deployment as part of Carrier Strike Group 10.

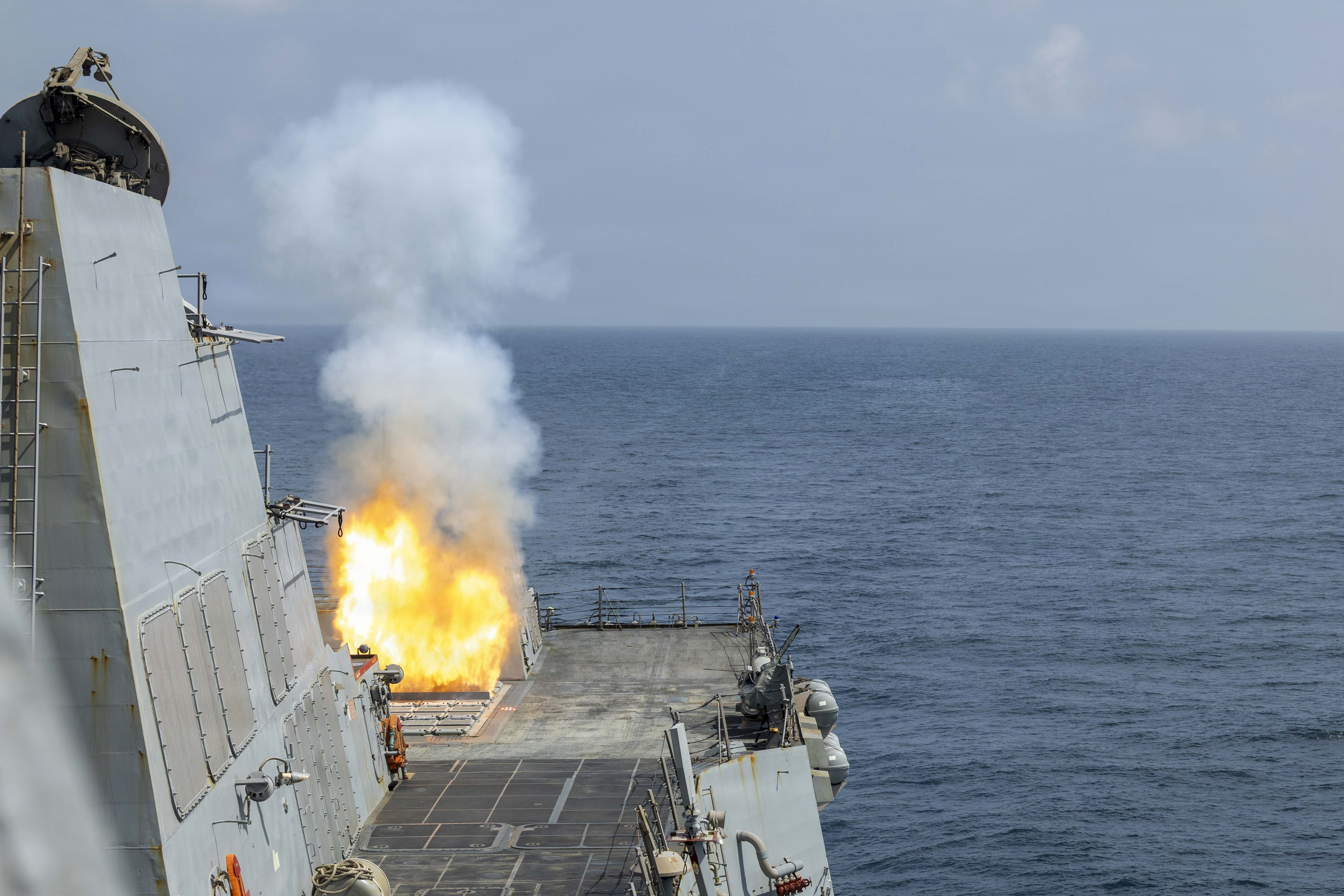
USS Delbert D. Black firing a Tomahawk cruise missile during the 2026 Iran war

On 29 September 2022, Delbert D. Black seized 7200 kilograms of hashish in the Gulf of Oman.

On 3 January 2026, the ship left for its regularly scheduled deployment. On 29 January 2026, amid rising tensions between the United States and Iran, it was reported the ship had arrived in the Middle East as part of an "armada" of ships sent by President Donald Trump. United States Central Command later released photos showing the destroyer launching cruise missiles at the beginning of the 2026 Iran war.
