= USS George Washington (CVN-73) =

US Navy Nimitz-class aircraft carrier

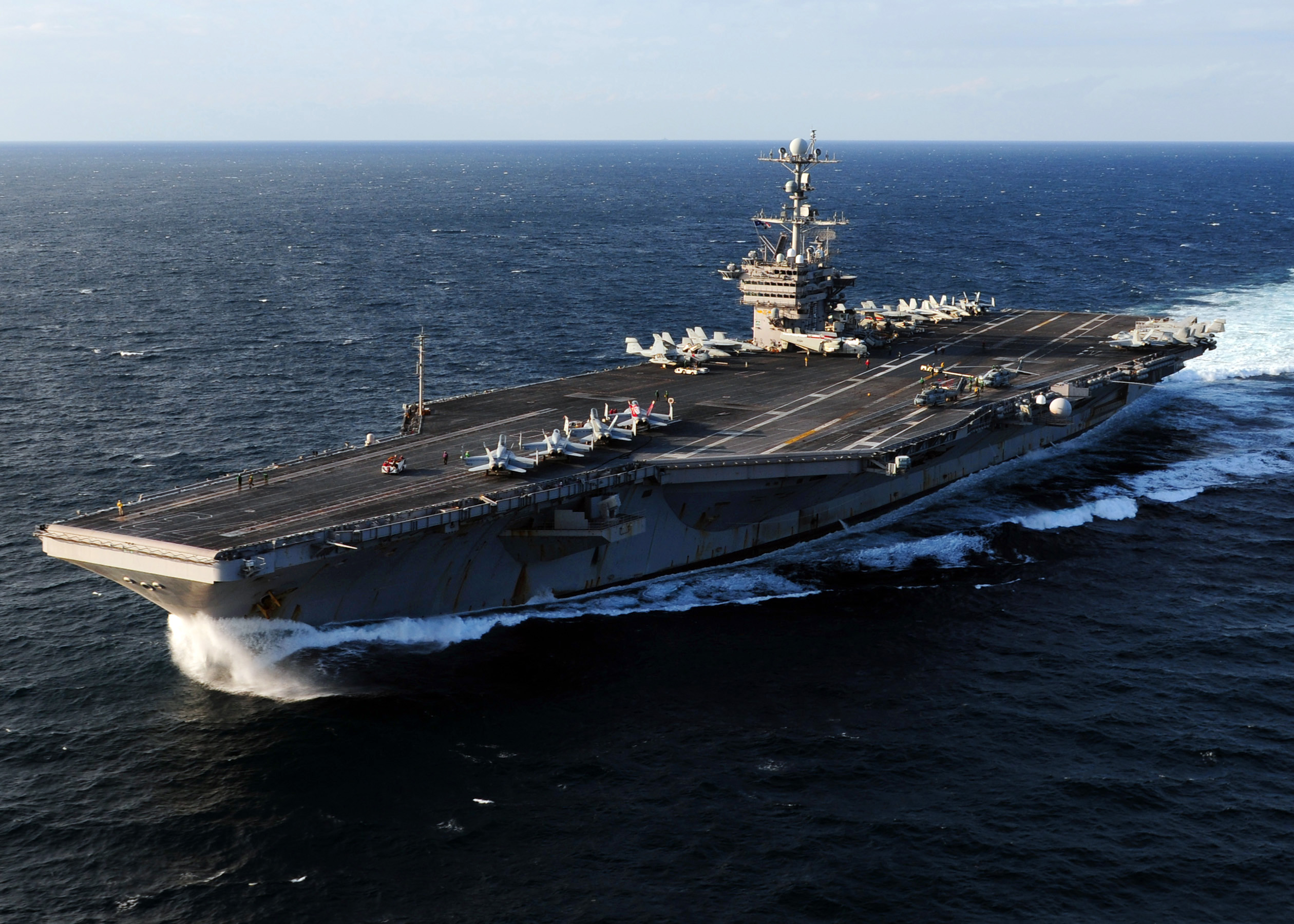
- USS George Washington (CVN-73)

History

United States
- Name: George Washington
- Namesake: George Washington
- Ordered: 27 December 1986
- Builder: Northrop Grumman Shipbuilding Newport News
- Laid down: 25 August 1986
- Launched: 21 July 1990
- Sponsored by: Barbara Bush
- Christened: 21 July 1990
- Acquired: 8 June 1992
- Commissioned: 4 July 1992
- Home port: Yokosuka
- Identification: MMSI number: 368913000; Callsign: NNGW; Hull number: CVN-73
- Motto: Spirit of Freedom
- Nickname(s): GW
- Status: in active service
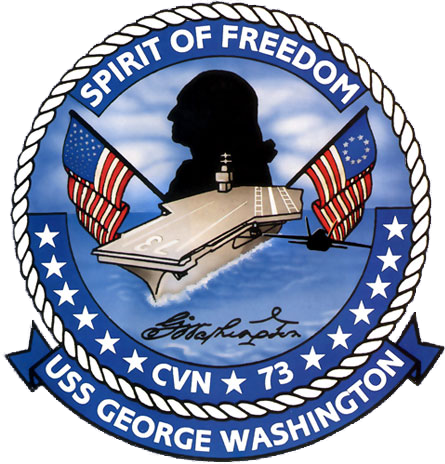
- Badge

General characteristics
- Class & type: Nimitz-class aircraft carrier
- Displacement: 104,200 long tons (116,700 short tons)
- Length: Overall: 1,092 ft (332.8 m); Waterline: 1,040 ft (317.0 m)
- Beam: Overall: 252 ft (76.8 m); Waterline: 134 ft (40.8 m)
- Draft: Maximum navigational: 37 ft (11.3 m); Limit: 41 ft (12.5 m)
- Propulsion: 2 × Westinghouse A4W nuclear reactors (HEU 93.5%); 4 × steam turbines; 4 × shafts; 260,000 shp (190 MW)
- Speed: 30 knots (56 km/h; 35 mph)+
- Range: Unlimited distance; 20–25 years
- Complement: Ship's company: 3,532; Air wing: 2,480
- Crew: 6012
- Sensors & processing systems: AN/SPS-48E 3-D air search radar; AN/SPS-49(V)5 2-D air search radar; AN/SPQ-9B target acquisition radar; AN/SPN-46 air traffic control radars; AN/SPN-43C air traffic control radar; AN/SPN-41 landing aid radars; 4 × Mk 91 NSSM guidance systems; 4 × Mk 95 radars
- Electronic warfare & decoys: AN/SLQ-32A(V)4 countermeasures suite; SLQ-25A Nixie torpedo countermeasures
- Armament: 2 × Mk 57 Mod3 Sea Sparrow; 2 × RIM-116 Rolling Airframe Missile; 3 × Phalanx CIWS
- Aircraft carried: 90 fixed wing and helicopters

USS George Washington (CVN-73) is a United States Navy nuclear-powered aircraft carrier, the sixth carrier in the Nimitz class and the fourth US Navy ship with that name, after George Washington, Founding Father, commander-in-chief of the Continental Army during the American Revolutionary War, and the first president of the United States. The contract for George Washington was awarded to Newport News Shipbuilding on 27 December 1982. Her keel was laid on 25 August 1986, she was christened on 21 July 1990 by First Lady Barbara Bush, and the vessel was commissioned at Naval Station Norfolk on 4 July 1992.

In 2008, USS George Washington became the first nuclear powered aircraft carrier to be forward-deployed at naval base Yokosuka, Japan.

The carrier underwent her four-year Refueling and Complex Overhaul (RCOH) beginning in August 2017. After refueling was completed additional repairs were found to be needed and the overhaul was extended. The ship was returned to service in May 2023.

== Description ==
George Washington (commonly known as GW) is 1,092 feet (333 m) long, 257 ft (78 m) wide and 244 ft (74 m) high. The super carrier can accommodate approximately 90 aircraft and has a flight deck 4.5 acres (18,000 m^{2}) in size, using four elevators that are 3,880 square feet (360 m^{2}) each to move planes between the Flight deck and the hangar bay. With a combat load, GW displaces almost 97,000 long tons (99,000 t) and can accommodate 6,250 crewmembers. Her four distilling units can make 400,000 U.S. gallons (1,500,000 L) of potable water a day; the food service divisions serve 18,000 meals per day. There are over 2,500 compartments on board requiring 2,520 refrigeration tons (8.6 MW) of air conditioning capacity (enough to cool over 2,000 homes). The warship uses two Mark II stockless anchors that weigh 30 tons each, with each link of the anchor chain weighing 360 pounds (160 kg). It is currently equipped with two 20 mm Phalanx CIWS mounts and two Sea Sparrow SAM launchers. One CIWS and one Sea Sparrow mount were removed to make way for two RIM-116 Rolling Airframe Missile launchers, installed during the 2005 Drydocking Planned Incremental Availability (DPIA).

=== Propulsion ===
The ship can reach speeds of over 30 knots (56 km/h; 35 mph) and is powered by two Westinghouse A4W nuclear reactors and has four 5-bladed propellers of 66,220 pounds (30,040 kg) each. The George Washington can travel more than 3,000,000 nautical miles (5,600,000 km; 3,500,000 mi) before needing refueling.

== History ==
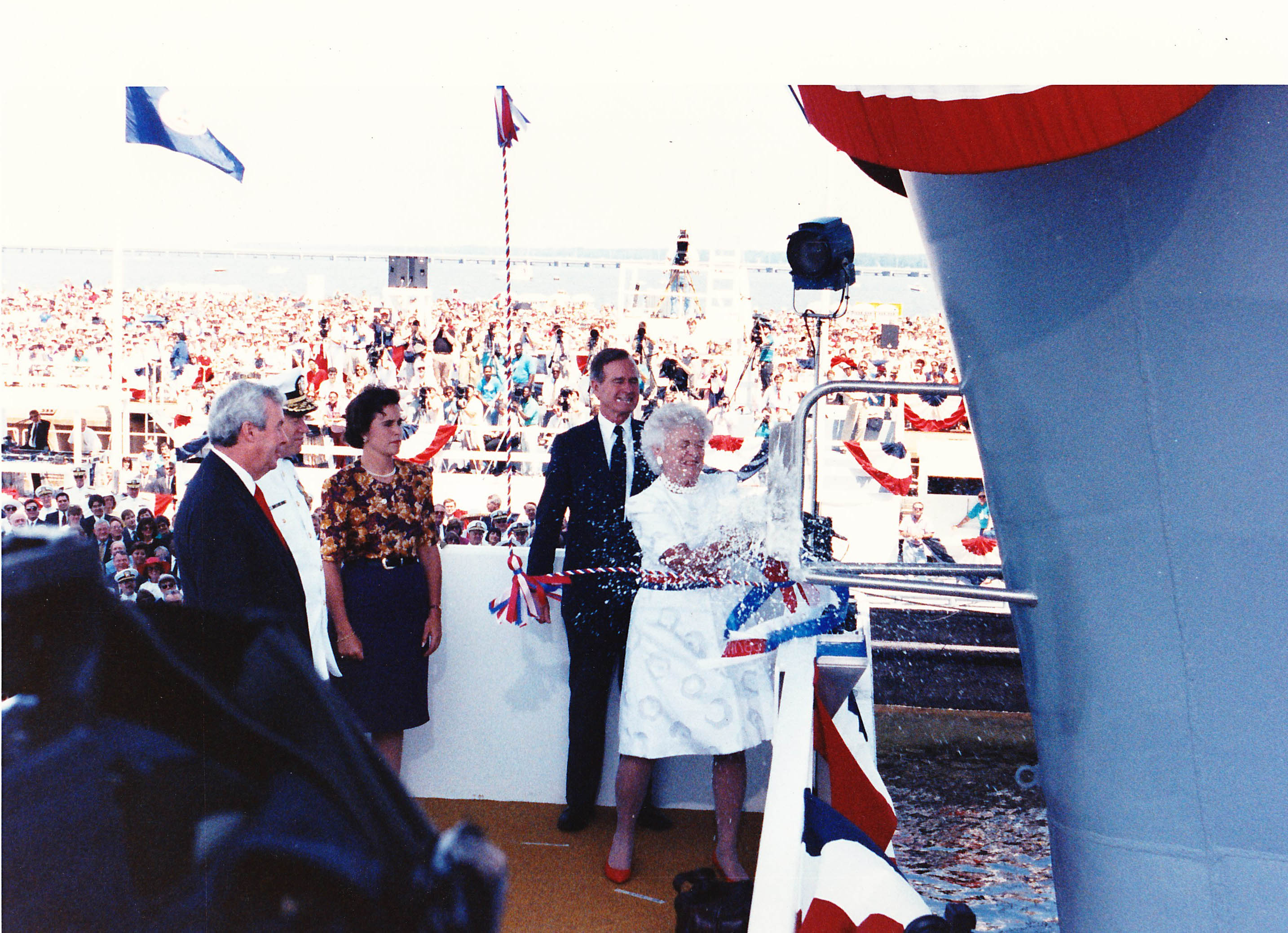
Barbara Bush christens USS George Washington on 21 July 1990 at Newport News Shipbuilding as President George H. W. Bush watches.

=== 1993–2000 ===
George Washington's career began with her Shakedown cruise and maiden voyage with CVW-7. In 1994, the ship took up station in the Adriatic in support of Operation Deny Flight and Operation Sharp Guard.

After transiting the Suez Canal, George Washington with CVW-7 embarked took up station in the Persian Gulf in support of Operation Vigilant Warrior, the US response to Iraqi troop repositioning near the border with Kuwait. The crisis abated when the Iraqi troops withdrew in October.

In 1996, George Washington and CVW-7 returned to Bosnia in support of Operation Joint Endeavour, a peace enforcement mission in Bosnia.

Later that year, CVW-1 was reassigned to George Washington. After a port visit to Haifa, Israel in November, the carrier battle group was ordered to the Persian Gulf in response to Saddam Hussein's barring UN weapon inspectors from carrying out their assigned tasks. As the crisis grew George Washington joined USS Nimitz and HMS Invincible to prepare for a bombing campaign against Iraq called Operation Desert Thunder. The crisis abated when Saddam agreed to let the United Nations continue the inspections.

In Autumn 1999, George Washington deployed again to the Persian Gulf in support of Operation Southern Watch over southern Iraq, launching its first airstrikes over Iraq.

=== 2001–2006 ===
George Washington was deployed to protect New York City after the September 11 attacks.

In June 2002, George Washington was deployed to the North Arabian Sea and the Persian Gulf and participated in Operation Enduring Freedom, supporting coalition forces in Afghanistan, and Operation Southern Watch.

On 20 February 2004, on a sixth deployment, George Washington entered the Gulf of Aden, and a week later, was conducting operations in the Persian Gulf. George Washington's air wing participated in strikes over Fallujah between 28 April – 29 April during Operation Vigilant Resolve.

On 28 January 2005, she entered the shipyard for Drydocking Planned Incremental Availability (DPIA). Many of the ship's systems were upgraded and maintenance was done to the hull. Her four jet blast deflectors were removed and upgraded to handle the increased heat generated by the F/A-18E/F Super Hornet. One defensive Phalanx CIWS mount and one Sea Sparrow launcher were replaced by two Rolling Airframe Missile launchers. During the 11 months she was drydocked, the crew contributed 20,000 hours of volunteer community service to the city of Newport News, Virginia. The work was completed on schedule, and George Washington returned to her home port of Norfolk on 17 December 2005.

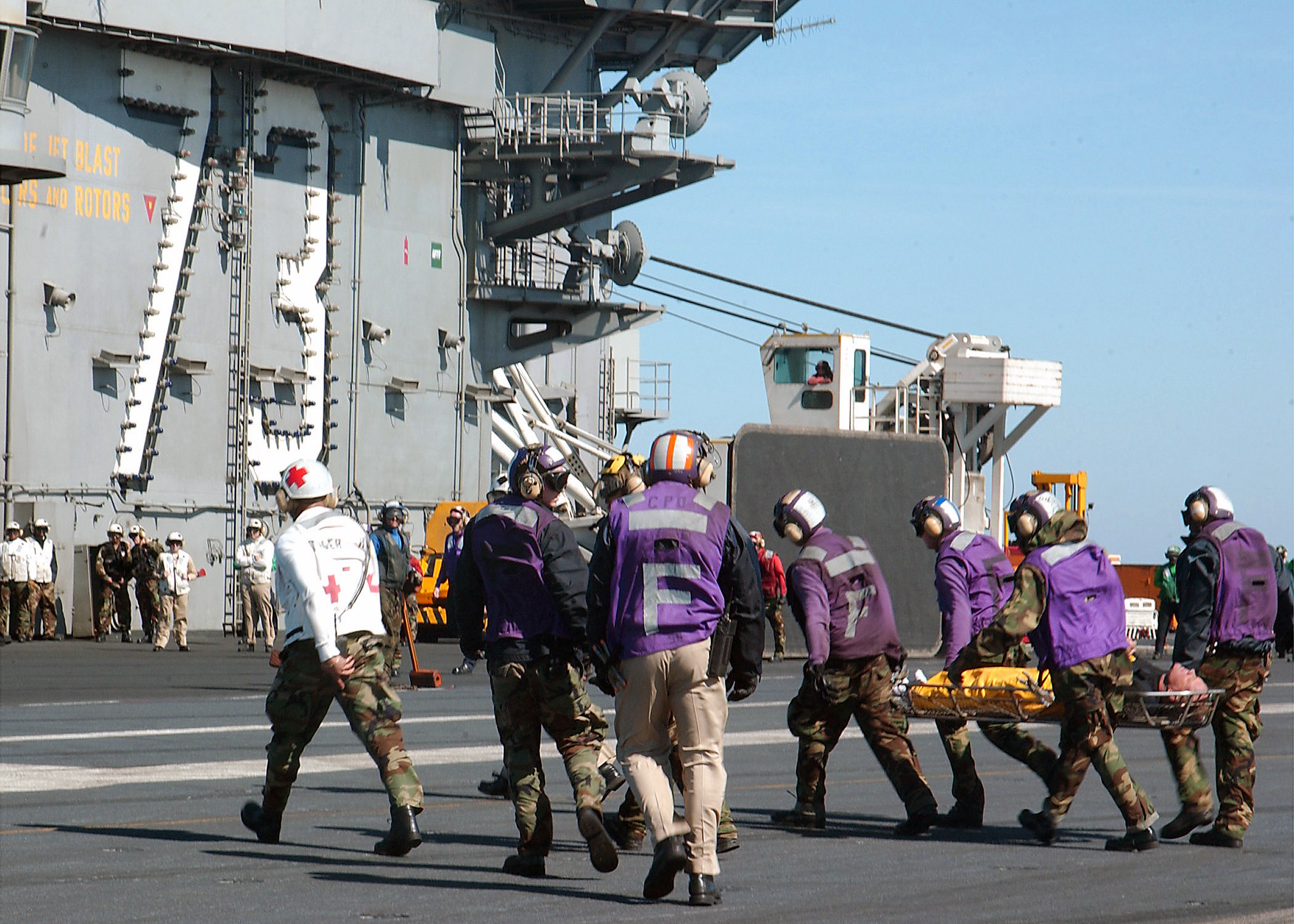
George Washington personnel carry injured personnel across the ship's flight deck after four personnel were rescued from the burning merchant fishing vessel, Diamond Shoal.

On 1 December 2005, the United States Navy announced that George Washington would replace Kitty Hawk as the forward-deployed carrier at the U.S. Yokosuka Naval Base in Japan, becoming the first nuclear-powered surface warship permanently stationed outside the continental U.S. In an attempt to explain the carrier's mission to the Japanese public, the U.S. Navy printed a manga about life aboard GW, titled "CVN-73".

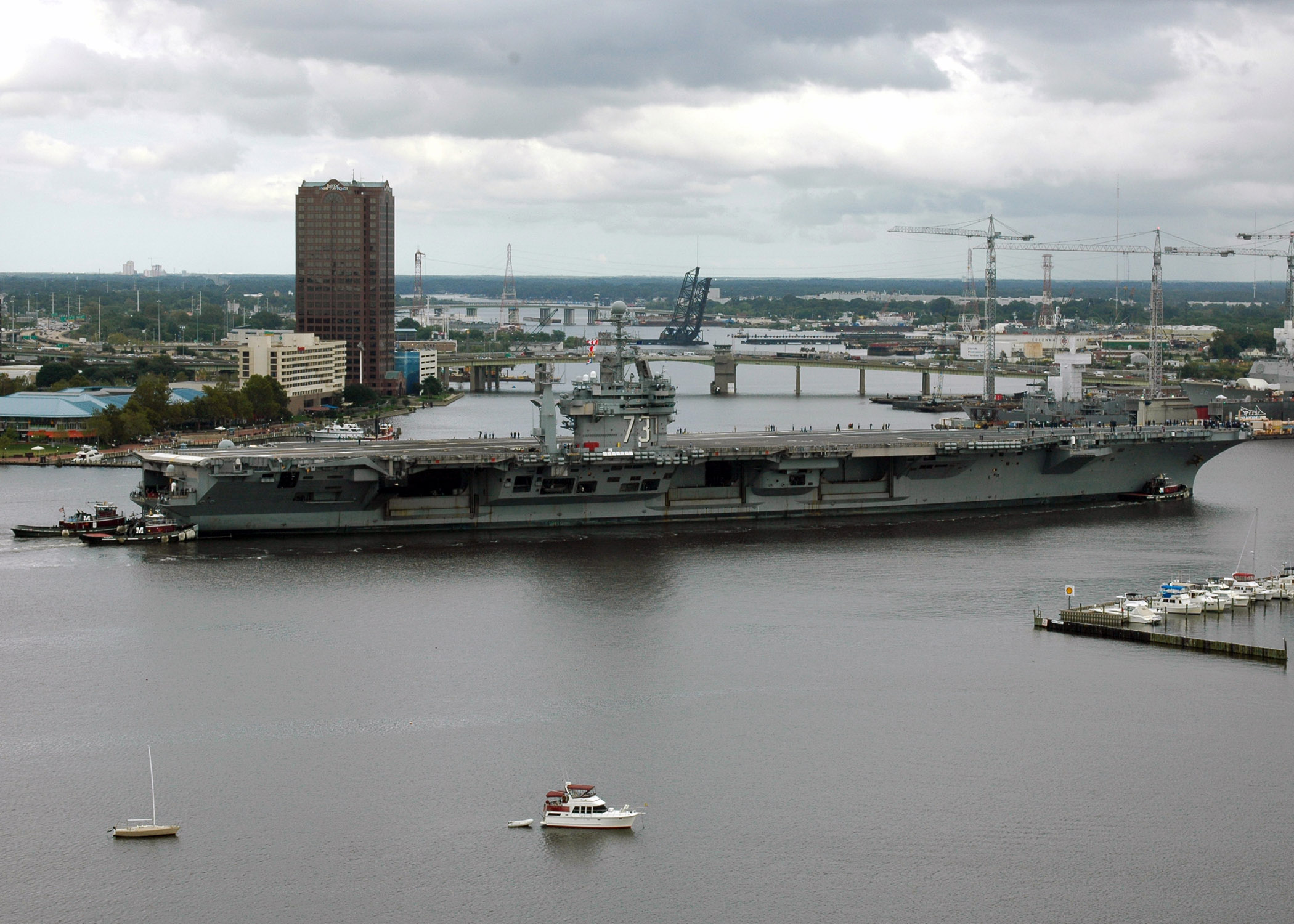
USS George Washington on her way to Norfolk Naval Shipyard

George Washington and CVW-17 left Norfolk on 4 April for a scheduled two-month deployment to operate as part of SOUTHCOM's "Partnership of the Americas". This deployment included counter-drug operations in the Caribbean Sea, crew exchanges and exercises with Latin American and South American navies, and port visits for the carrier and strike group, which consisted of the cruiser Monterey, the destroyer Stout, and the frigate Underwood. The first of these port visits took place from 14 to 17 April in St. Maarten, and Antigua from 15 to 18 May. She returned to Norfolk on 24 May.

=== 2008 fire and 2009 ===
On 7 April 2008, George Washington, with CVW-17 and Carrier Strike Group 8 embarked, departed Norfolk en route to Yokosuka, Japan to replace Kitty Hawk, taking a route around South America as she is too large for the Panama Canal; she took part there in the Gringo-Gaucho maneuvers with Argentine Naval Aviation. After the planned turnover with Kitty Hawk at NS Pearl Harbor, Hawaii, CVW-17 and Carrier Strike Group Eight were to return to their home ports in the U.S. to be replaced by Carrier Air Wing 5, based at Naval Air Facility Atsugi, and Carrier Strike Group Five based at Yokosuka Naval Base in Yokosuka, Japan.

During the South American transit, the George Washington Battle Group participated in U.S. Southern Command exercises Partnership of the Americas and Unitas, a joint military exercise between the United States, Brazilian and Argentine navies. On 22 April 2008, George Washington arrived in Rio de Janeiro, Brazil, for her first port visit to that country. The ship traversed the Strait of Magellan on 9–10 May.

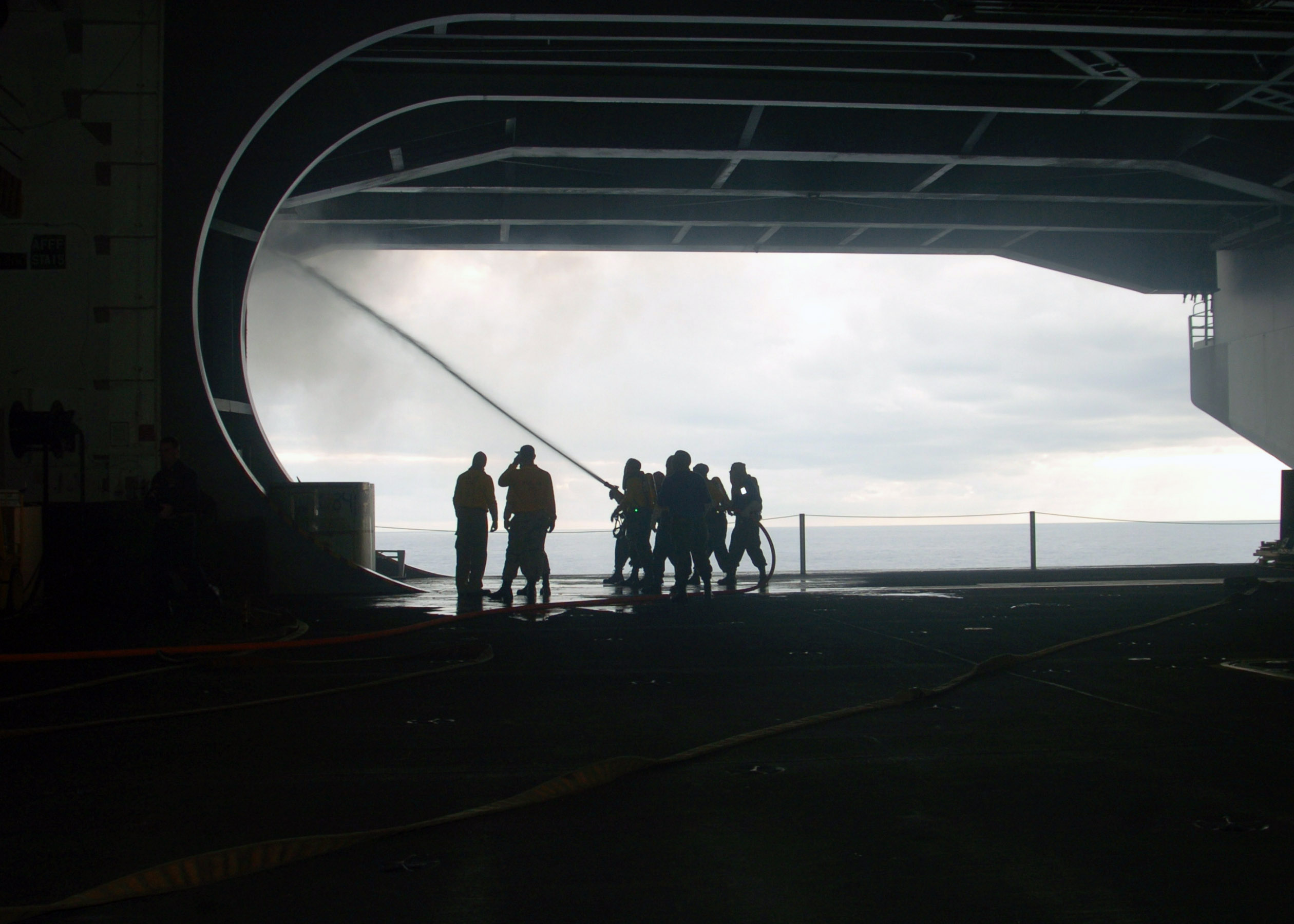
Firefighting in Hangar Bay 3

On 22 May 2008, while the ship was off the Pacific Coast of South America, a fire broke out and injured 37 sailors, with no fatalities, in an incident described by the Navy as "serious". According to a statement from Naval Air Forces' public affairs office, the fire broke out in the ship's air-conditioning and refrigeration space and an auxiliary boiler room. The fire spread via a cableway and ventilation ducting and caused extreme temperatures in some parts of the ship. It took over twelve hours for the crew to contain and extinguish the fire, one of the largest non-combat fires aboard a U.S. Naval vessel since the devastating fire on board USS Forrestal in 1967.

On 27 May, George Washington stopped at Naval Air Station North Island (NAS North Island) in San Diego, California for repairs. On 20 June the Navy announced that the damage from the fire was more serious than previously thought, and that repairs would take at least until August and would cost $70 million. As a consequence, Kitty Hawk was retained in Hawaii during June and July to replace George Washington in the RIMPAC 2008 exercises, with the planned turnover to take place in San Diego instead of Hawaii.

A Navy investigation found that the "entirely preventable" fire had been caused by unauthorized smoking in a room where 115 US gallons (440 L) of flammable refrigerant compressor oil was improperly stored. The room was near the aft auxiliary boiler. The ship's damage control team took nearly eight hours to discover the source of the smoke and flames. By that time, the fire had spread to eight decks and 80 compartments, and destroyed miles of electrical and fiber-optic cables. The damage control department had been found deficient in three inspections between June 2007 and April 2008. Although the carrier's commanding officer started a program to remedy the team's training and performance in the month before the fire, the report found those efforts to have been insufficient. Admiral Robert F. Willard, commander of the U.S. Pacific Fleet, noted in his investigation, "It is apparent from this extensive study that there were numerous processes and procedures related to fire prevention and readiness and training that were not properly functioning. The extent of damage could have been reduced had numerous longstanding firefighting and firefighting management deficiencies been corrected." Willard added that "Many crew members ... displayed courage and resolve in fighting the fires."

On 30 July 2008, Willard announced that Captain David C. Dykhoff had been relieved of his duties as Commanding Officer citing "a loss of confidence in his ability to command and his failure to meet mission requirements and readiness standards." Executive Officer Captain David M. Dober was also relieved for "substandard performance." Six other sailors were disciplined with non-judicial punishment. Four sailors were found guilty of violating a lawful order and hiding hazardous materials in direct violation of safety regulations. The Navy's Pacific Fleet refused to name the enlisted sailors disciplined. Two non-commissioned officers were found guilty of negligence and dereliction of duty for not properly supervising the workspace. The Navy and Marine Corps Medal was awarded to Senior Chief Petty Officer Keith Hendrickson for leading a team that rescued four shipmates trapped by the fire deep in the interior of the ship.

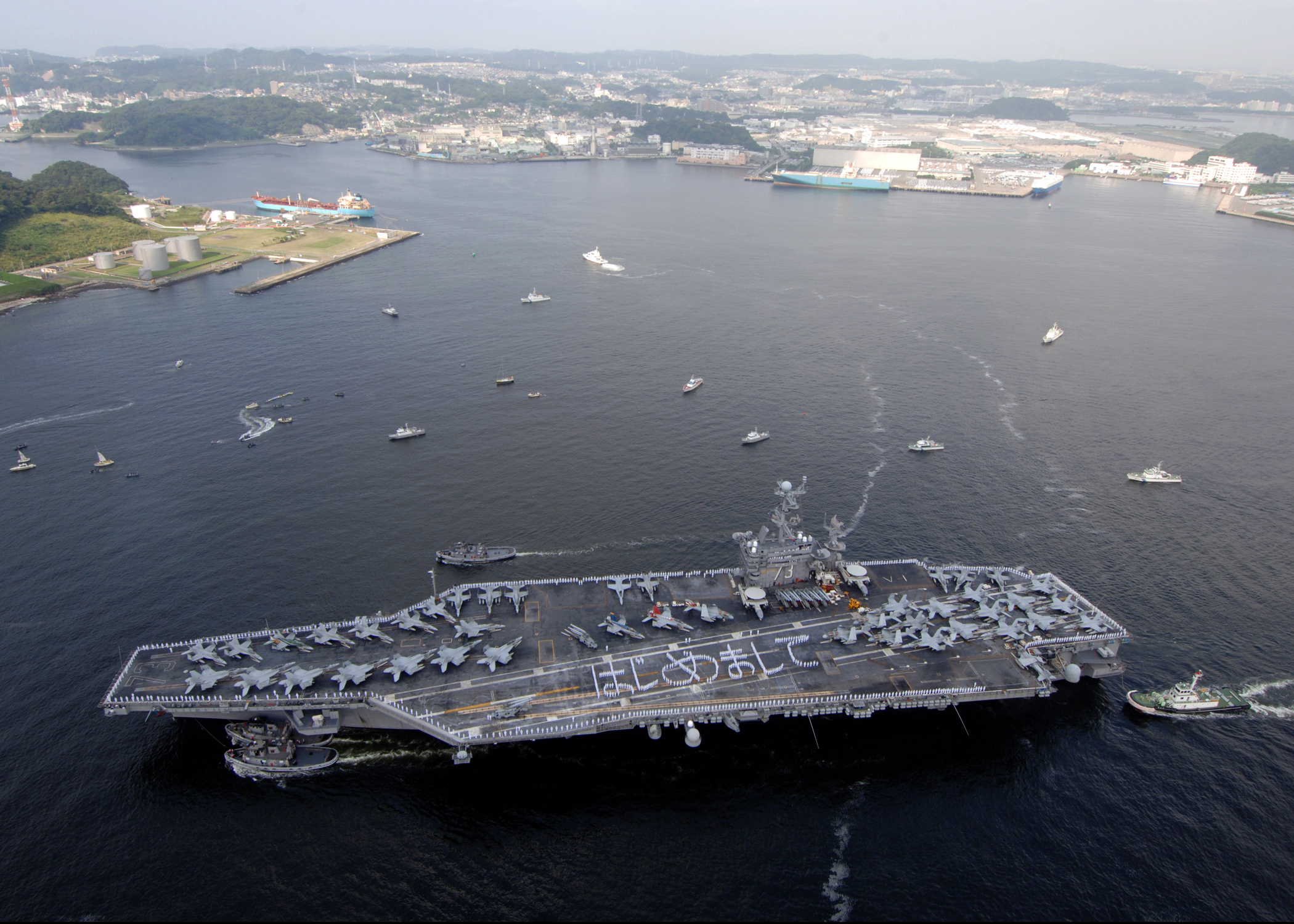
Sailors form the phrase, "Nice to meet you" in Japanese, as they arrive in Yokosuka

On 21 August, under new skipper Captain J.R. Haley and executive officer Captain Karl O. Thomas, George Washington departed NAS North Island for Japan, with Carrier Air Wing Five (CVW 5) embarked. The carrier arrived at Yokosuka, Japan on 25 September 2008, where she was met by several hundred local supporters and protesters.

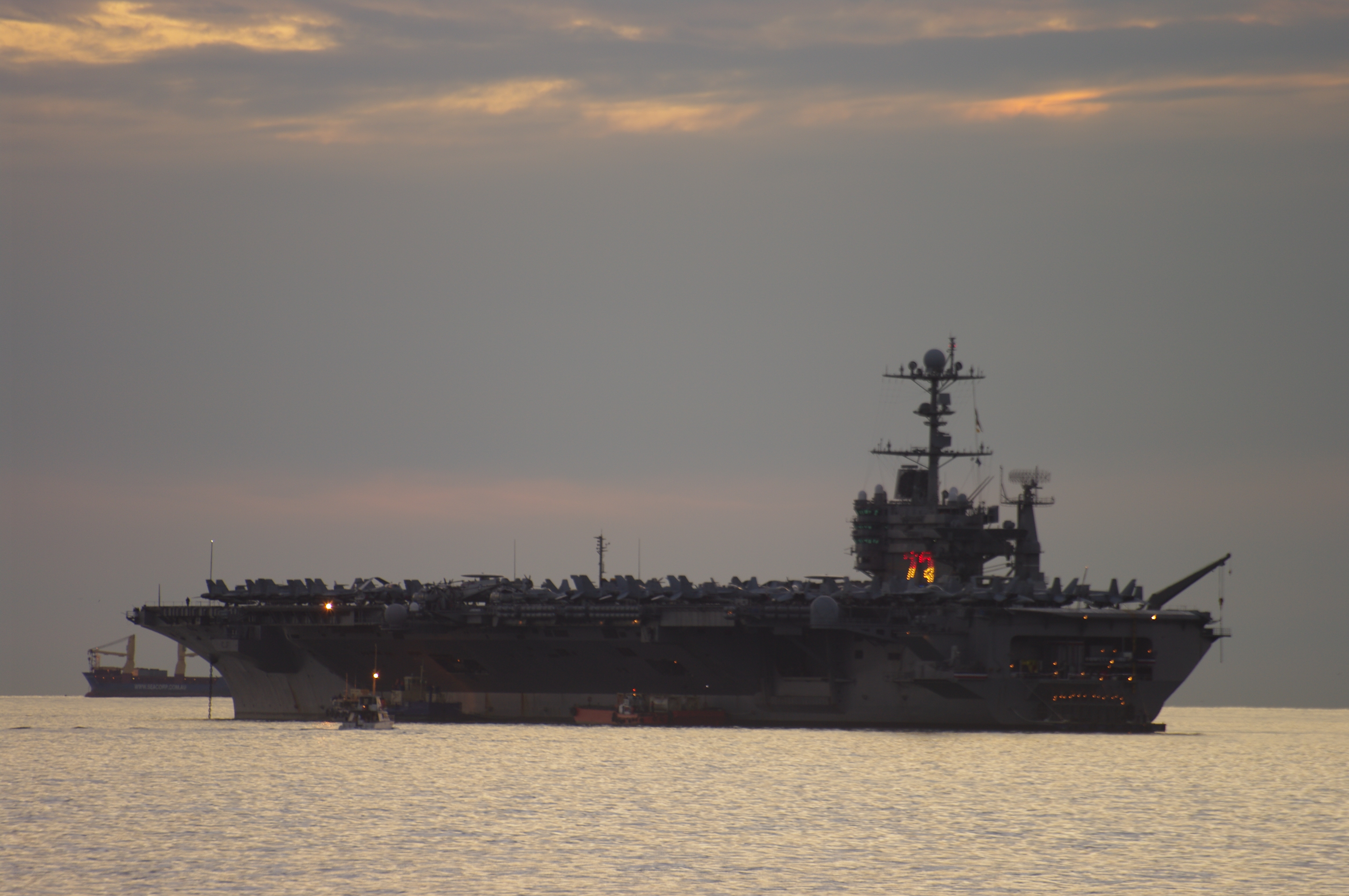
Anchored in Gage Roads Western Australia July 2009

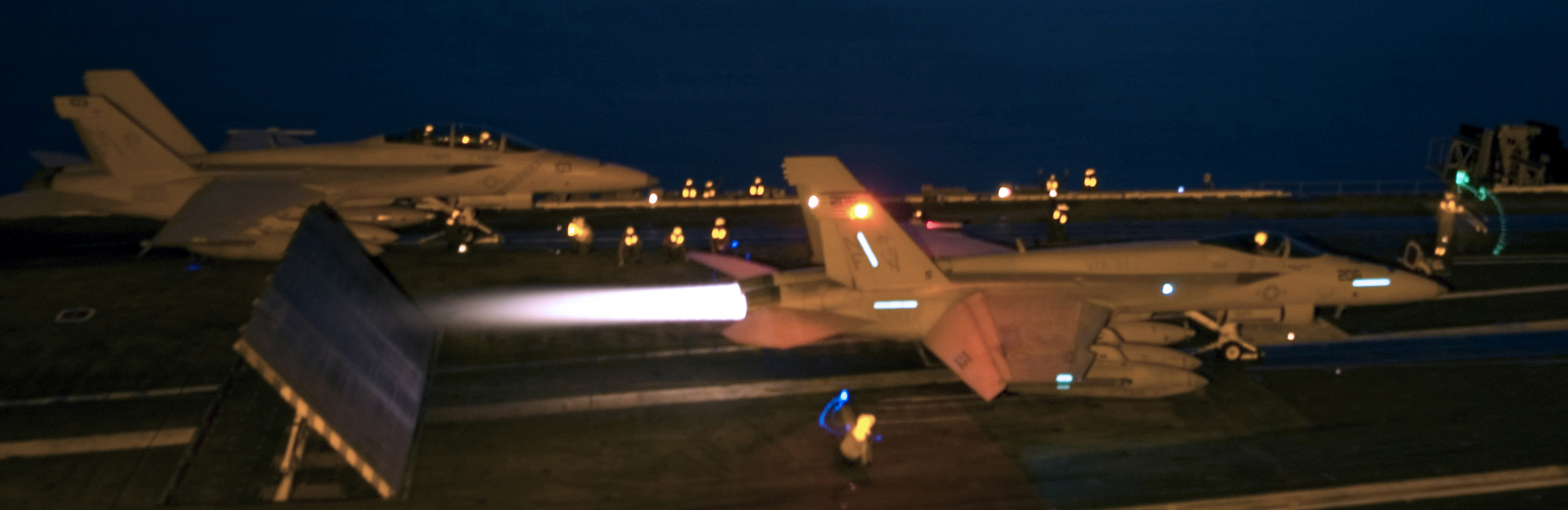
An F/A-18E/F Super Hornet assigned to the Royal Maces launches from USS George Washington

In June 2009, the Navy revealed that 15 of the carrier's sailors were being expelled from the service for use of illegal designer drugs. On 2 July 2009, George Washington, accompanied by USS Cowpens, anchored on the Gage Roads of Perth. Her crew visited Fremantle and Perth. Local brothels recruited extra staff to cope with the increase in business. Crew members volunteered to complete community projects including cleaning, maintenance, and painting at organizations including PMH, a Salvation Army rehabilitation center, Perth Zoo and Cohunu Koala Park. In mid-July the ship took part in Exercise Talisman Saber off the coast of Australia's Northern Territory.

From 2 to 6 August 2009, George Washington made a port call in Singapore where sailors were granted rest and recreation leave and participated in community relations projects such as painting and landscaping at a local community center, children's center, special education school and an association for the disabled.

The ship made a 4-day goodwill visit to Manila Bay, Philippines, anchoring off historic Corregidor Island from 11 to 15 August 2009.

In August 2009, George Washington participated in the Indonesian Fleet Review, during "Sail Bunaken 2009", in North Sulawesi, Indonesia. The parade of warships and tall ships from 40 nations included five from the George Washington Carrier Strike Group, including George Washington, Cowpens, Mustin, McCampbell, and Fitzgerald. Carrier Airwing Five, currently embarked on George Washington, also participated with a multi-aircraft fly-by of the viewing station during the parade. The George Washington Carrier Strike Group returned to Japan 3 September for a maintenance upkeep period prior to her second fall patrol.

On 29 October George Washington docked at Hong Kong to resupply and stayed for four to five days.

=== 2010–2016 ===
On 11 May 2010, George Washington completed maintenance and refit and departed Yokosuka for trials. On 21 July 2010, she arrived at Busan, South Korea for a port visit and then participated in exercise Invincible Spirit in the Sea of Japan with the USAF, Republic of Korea Air Force and Republic of Korea Navy from 25 to 28 July 2010. Invincible Spirit was staged to improve combined operations capability and as a show of deterrence following the ROKS Cheonan sinking. The exercise was conducted in the Sea of Japan to placate China's objections to military exercises being conducted in the Yellow Sea. Due in part to those objections a second exercise, in the Yellow Sea on the west coast of North Korea, was planned. On 8 August 2010, George Washington stopped off the coast of Da Nang City in the South China Sea to celebrate the 15th anniversary of normalization of Vietnam-US diplomatic relations, the first Vietnam visit by a U.S. aircraft carrier since the Vietnam War. In November 2010, the George Washington carrier group departed for planned exercises with the Republic of Korea Navy, partially in response to the shelling of Yeonpyeong and increased tension with North Korea.

George Washington was one of several ships participating in disaster relief after the 2011 Tōhoku earthquake and tsunami. While docked for maintenance in Yokosuka she detected radiation from the Fukushima I nuclear accidents, and was ordered to leave port before schedule, with a smaller-than-normal crew, to avoid the radioactive plume. The smaller crew was unable to continue to provide aid. While at sea, the carrier made two visits to United States Fleet Activities Sasebo to exchange crew members and take on maintenance equipment. The ship returned to her berth at Yokosuka on 20 April 2011.

A 2011 proposal by U.S. Senator Tom Coburn (OK-R) called for the decommissioning of George Washington in 2016, before beginning her refueling and complex overhaul but after the carrier Gerald R. Ford enters service.

After redeploying on another training cruise, a 25 September 2011 video from the carrier uploaded to YouTube became a viral hit. In the video, two flight deck crewmen are almost hit by a landing F/A-18, which is waved-off shortly before landing on the deck where the crewmen are walking. On 22 November 2011, George Washington returned to Japan to conclude her 2011 patrol, with four port visits including Thailand, South Korea, Singapore, and Hong Kong and two major exercises while cruising more than 50,000 nautical miles across the western Pacific Ocean. During deployment, the aircraft carrier participated in joint training exercises with other service branches and regional partners, visited three Asia-Pacific nations (South Korea, Hong Kong, Malaysia) to practice interoperability, and conducted dual-carrier operations with John C. Stennis.

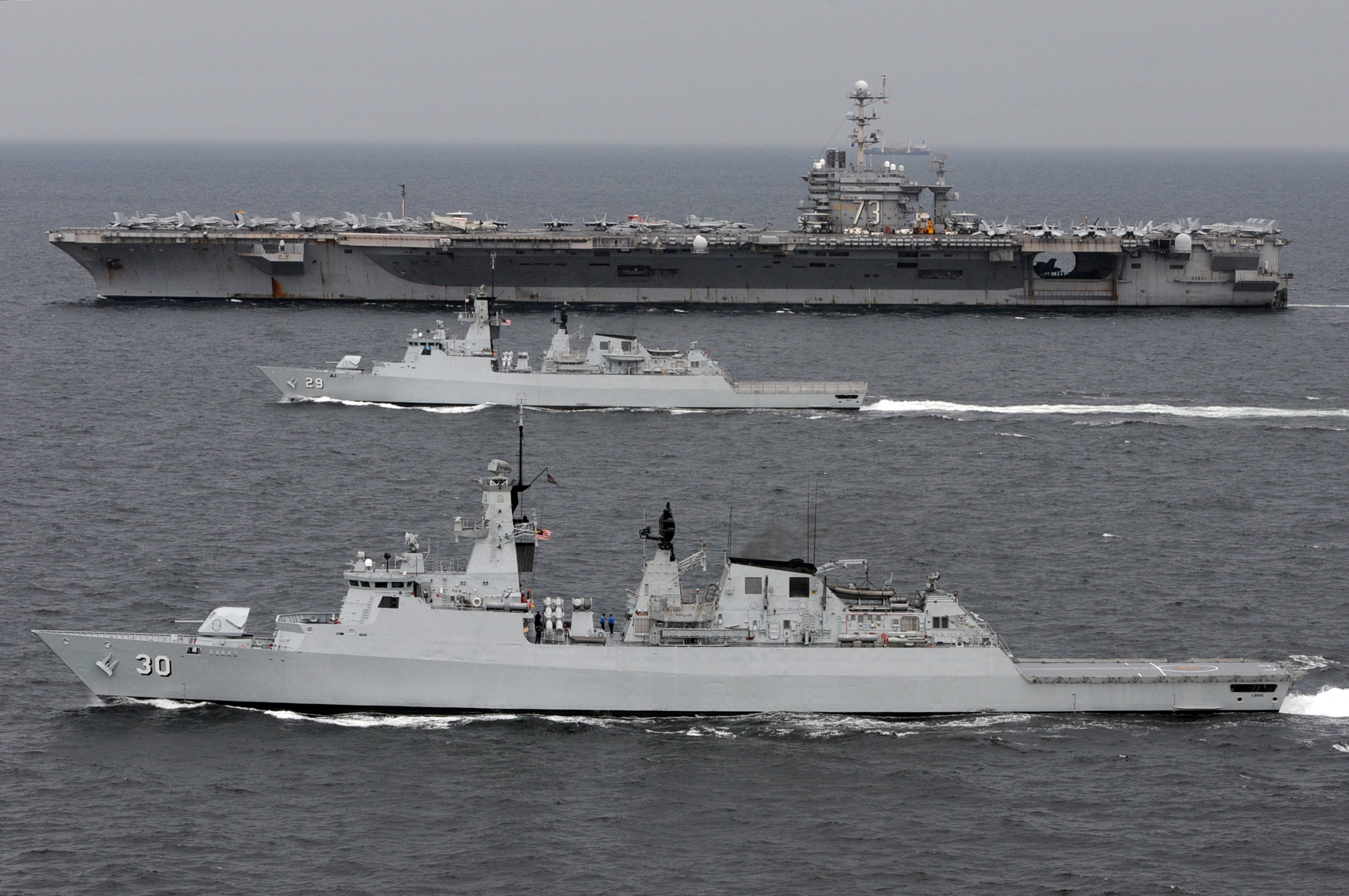
Nimitz-class aircraft carrier George Washington is underway with the Royal Malaysian Navy Lekiu-class frigates KD Jebat and KD Lekiu (foreground) during a transit of the Andaman Sea

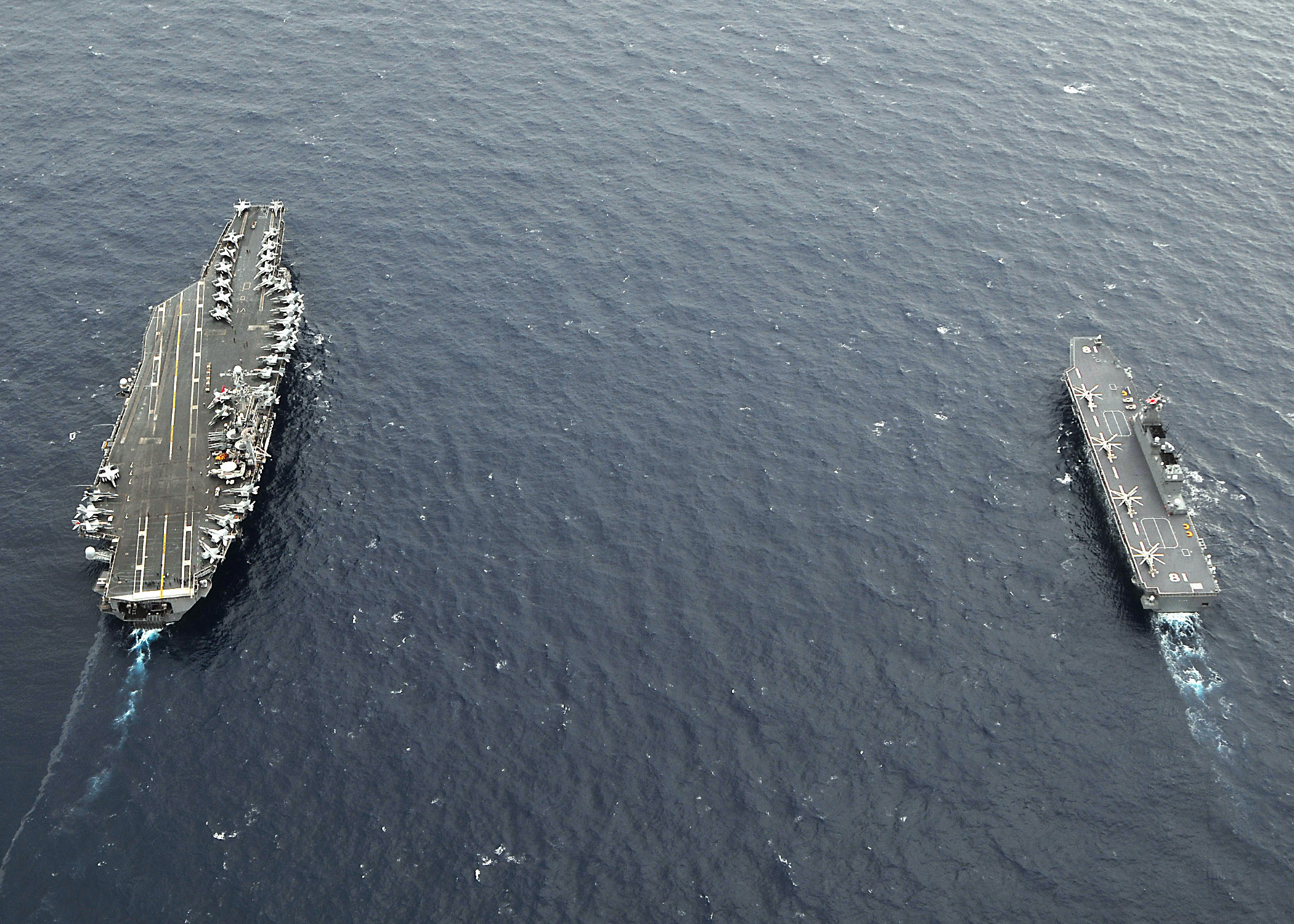
USS George Washington and the Japan Maritime Self-Defense Force helicopter destroyer Hyūga

On 8 February 2013, the U.S. Department of Defense announced that the scheduled mid-life complex overhaul for the carrier Abraham Lincoln would be postponed pending the resolution of the upcoming budget sequestration. The budget shortfall would affect Lincoln's refueling of her nuclear propulsion plant, the next scheduled mid-life complex overhaul involving George Washington forward-based in United States Fleet Activities Yokosuka, Japan, and the de-fueling of the recently deactivated nuclear-powered Enterprise. George Washington and her support vessels visited Brisbane, Australia in July.

The ship moored on 4 October 2013 in Busan, South Korea, for a regularly scheduled liberty port visit. In November 2013, she visited Victoria Harbour, Hong Kong. On 11 November 2013 George Washington and her carrier strike group were deployed for a humanitarian mission in the Philippines, Operation Damayan, after destructive Typhoon Haiyan. The carrier group arrived on 14 November, delivered relief supplies, and deployed aircraft for search and rescue missions. On 6 December 2013, George Washington returned to her forward-deployed port of Fleet Activities Yokosuka, Japan.

In January 2014, it was announced that George Washington would be replaced by Ronald Reagan at Yokosuka when the ship's Refuelling and Complex Overhaul is due.

As part of the Navy's FY 2015 budget, Pentagon officials hinted at the possibility of taking George Washington out of service due to budget reductions. The ship is due for her mid-life refueling and overhaul in 2016, which will take three years and cost over $3 billion. The decision to replace George Washington with the newer Ronald Reagan in her area of operations near Japan means decommissioning the ship would not affect American carrier presence in the region. In 2011, the Congressional Budget Office had found that the elimination of a carrier and an air wing would save about $7 billion from 2012 through 2021, the time at which George Washington would be expected to return to service. Nimitz is the oldest ship in the class and would be expected to be decommissioned early instead of George Washington. However, Nimitz has undergone a mid-life refuelling and is not due for decommission until the mid-2020s, whereas George Washington has yet to undergo this procedure, providing an opportunity to remove the ship from service before the planned expenditure.

In February 2014, under pressure from Congress, the Obama administration was reported to have decided to request additional funds from Congress for the refueling. However, if sequestration is not repealed by 2016, the Pentagon may not be able to find funding to keep George Washington operating and it may have to be retired.

In the draft of the Navy's unfunded priorities list for FY 2015, a $796 million line item was included for the Refueling and Complex Overhaul (RCOH) of George Washington. Before it was approved by the Pentagon and sent to Congress, it was vetted by the Office of the Secretary of Defense (OSD) and signed by Chief of Naval Operations Jonathan Greenert, after which the line item was removed. In a 31 March 2014 letter to Congress, Admiral Greenert said that the decision to remove the RCOH line item from the unfunded priorities list was made to align with budget decisions over the next several years. The list was for the FY 2015, so a decision to refuel or inactivate the carrier has to be made during FY 2016 budget planning with the fiscal outlook at that time and the possibility of sequestration funding levels. The removal of the line item removes funding for advanced procurement of materials for the overhaul; another line item had funding to remove the fuel from the ship, but not to overhaul or refuel it.

By July 2014, the Navy had decided it would find the $7 billion in funds needed to keep George Washington in service. This was followed by three congressional marks to fund the Refueling and Complex Overhaul if the Navy would not provide funding in the FY 2015 budget. As of July 2014, the Navy was still awaiting the fate of sequestration and the moving of funds to refueling the ship puts pressure on other programs. The Navy's FY 2016 budget funds nuclear refueling and overhaul of George Washington.

George Washington departed Japan in May 2015 to participate in Exercise Talisman Saber 2015 with Australia and New Zealand. She arrived at NAS North Island on 10 August. In San Diego, George Washington conducted a 10-day turn over period with Ronald Reagan before leaving the Southern California operating area for Naval Station Norfolk, where the ship is expected to begin mid-life RCOH at Newport News Shipbuilding, Huntington Ingalls Industries in fall 2016.

George Washington deployed in October 2016 to Haiti to provide support after Hurricane Matthew, along with USNS Comfort and USS Mesa Verde.

=== 2017–2023 overhaul ===
On 4 August 2017, George Washington entered the Dry Dock #11 at the HII Newport News Shipbuilding in Newport News, Virginia, for a four-year Refueling and Complex Overhaul (RCOH). The contract for the RCOH was worth $2.8 billion and work was expected to be completed by August 2021. However, due to the COVID-19 pandemic, work was planned to finish in early 2023. This target date was confirmed in August 2022. Sea trials and re-delivery to the Navy were completed in May 2023.

In October 2024, the Navy reported that welders at the Newport News Shipyard purposely circumvented proper procedures, resulting in substandard welds on the ship. The Navy said the faulty welds did not impact the safety of the vessel.

==== 2021–2022 suicides ====
On 11 April 2022, Captain Brent Gaut informed sailors on George Washington over intercom that two sailors had died on 9 and 10 April, and that those deaths were the eighth and ninth suicides the ship had experienced in nine months. Shortly thereafter, a tenth suicide occurred on 15 April, described by Gaut to the crew as a member of the ship's security team, who had a self-inflicted wound. Of these reported suicides, the Navy had acknowledged seven deaths, with only five noted as suicides. Initially, the Navy's response from Russell L. Smith, the Master Chief Petty Officer of the Navy, was that things could be worse, "at least you're not in a foxhole", and that the Navy was effectively unable to remedy the situation. The issue gained wider media attention during the next two weeks, and by 29 April 2022, Captain Gaut announced that the ship would move 260 sailors "to an offsite barracks-type living arrangement on Norfolk Naval Shipyard in Portsmouth", specifically, a Navy Gateway Inn and Suites, starting the following Monday, and the number would expand at about 50 additional beds per week. According to the commanding officer, the ship currently has 422 sailors living on board. The move was confirmed by the Navy and would continue "until all Sailors who wish to move off-ship have done so." Interviews with the crew and the crew's family have described the issue as "living at a construction site" as the George Washington has been docked at the Newport News Shipyard in Virginia since 2017, and many sailors trained for shipboard duties are relegated to maintenance or cleaning, while suffering lack of sleep. Several have claimed to sleep in their cars in preference to the ship.

The Navy opened an investigation into the command climate and culture on board George Washington in response to the suicides.

=== 2025 deployment ===
President Donald Trump arrives in Japan on George Washington to meet Prime Minister Sanae Takaichi, 28 October 2025

It was announced on 3 March 2023 that following the completion of her overhaul, George Washington was expected to be forward-deployed to Japan. She replaced USS Ronald Reagan, which by that point had been forward-deployed there for ten years. This follows the new federal law enacted in 2019, that limited the forward-deployment length of naval vessels to ten years. She departed NS Norfolk on 25 April 2024, and participated in U.S. Naval Forces Southern Command/U.S. 4th Fleet's Southern Seas 2024 deployment en route to NAS North Island. There, the crews of George Washington and Ronald Reagan swapped ships. George Washington proceeded to Japan from there, arriving in her new homeport of Yokosuka, Japan on 22 November 2024.

=== 2026 deployment ===
On 13 August 2026, The Wall Street Journal reported that the United States was sending George Washington to the Middle East to relieve the USS Abraham Lincoln, which was being rotated out after an extended deployment of more than 250 days that included combat operations in the U.S. campaign against Iran. NPR reported on 14 August 2026 that the George Washington left port from Da Nang, Vietnam, the prior week. On August 20, CENTCOM posted on X that the ship had arrived in theatre the day before. On 22 August Senator Richard Blumenthal expressed his concern for supplying the George Washington in light of the challenges experienced by the Lincoln, as he doubted the means and routes to supply the ship during the Iran War had improved.

The move of the George Washington to the Middle East left no U.S. aircraft carrier in the West Pacific at that time. Retired Rear Admiral Mark Montgomery, a former commander of Carrier Strike Group 5 aboard the George Washington, stated that the move would leave limited naval presence for over a year and half in the Pacific, representing a "national security risk" as it weakened deterrence to China.
