= FITC =

FITC may refer to:

- Fluorescein isothiocyanate, a chemical compound
- Flash In the Can, a variation of the expression "flash in the pan" that indicates brevity - see Flash pan
- Fleet Intelligence Training Center - see Intelligence Specialist (United States Navy ratings)
