= James Honea =

16th Master Chief Petty Officer of the US Navy

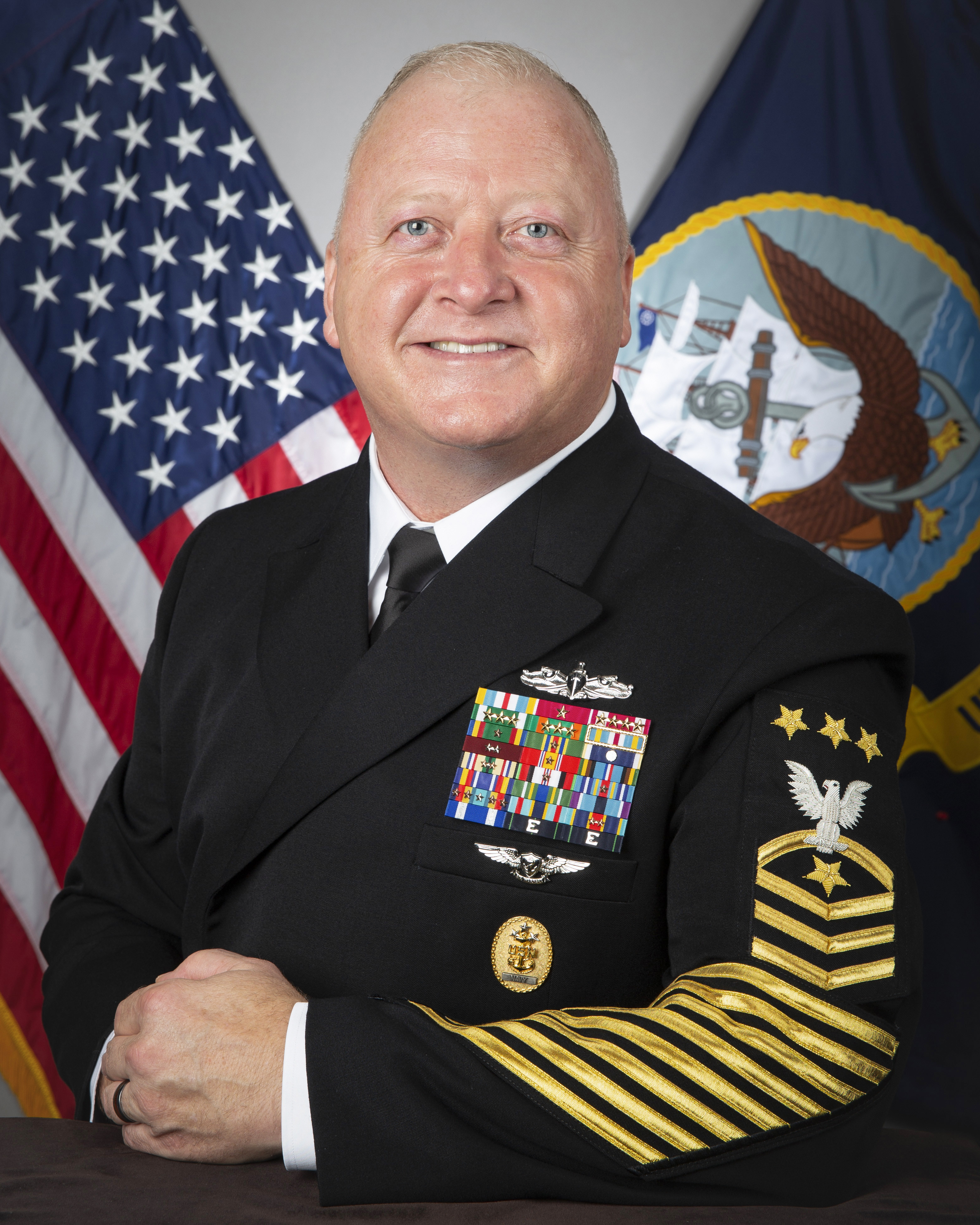
- Official portrait, 2022
- Born: Lubbock, Texas, U.S.
- Military career
- Allegiance: United States
- Branch: United States Navy
- Service years: 1987–2025
- Rank: Master Chief Petty Officer of the Navy
- Conflicts: War in Afghanistan
- Awards: Defense Superior Service Medal; Legion of Merit (2); Meritorious Service Medal (5); Navy and Marine Corps Commendation Medal (4); Navy and Marine Corps Achievement Medal (4)
- James Honea's voice Honea's opening statement at a House Armed Services Military Personnel Subcommittee hearing on the state of enlisted personnel Recorded March 9, 2023

James M. Honea is a retired United States Navy sailor who served as the 16th Master Chief Petty Officer of the Navy from 8 September 2022 to 12 September 2025. He was previously the Senior Enlisted Leader of United States Indo-Pacific Command from August 2021 to June 2022.

== Naval career ==
After attending basic training at Recruit Training Center San Diego, California, in 1987, Honea began his navy career as a Boatswain's Mate on USS John A. Moore (FFG-19). He continued to rise through the ranks, serving aboard amphibious assault ships. His sea assignments include USS Juneau (LPD-10), USS Dubuque (LPD 8), and USS Bonhomme Richard (LHD 6). When he achieved the rank of command master chief, he continued to serve at sea aboard the destroyer USS Gridley (DDG 101), and later another amphibious assault ship USS New Orleans (LPD 18).

Honea's shore tours include service as the command master chief of United States Navy Embedded Training Teams, Combined Joint Task Force Phoenix, deployed to Afghanistan; as the command master chief at Naval Support Activity South Potomac; as the command master chief of United States Naval Forces Korea; and most recently as the fleet master chief of United States Pacific Fleet.

Honea completed the Command Master Chief Course and Senior Enlisted JPME Keystone Course at the National Defense University. He is also a graduate from the United States Air Force Senior Non-Commissioned Officer Academy.

He assumed the office of Master Chief Petty Officer of the Navy (MCPON) on September 8, 2022 from Russell L. Smith. He retired on September 12, 2025.

== Personal life ==
Honea married Evelyn in 1989 when he was stationed in Long Beach, California. They have two children.

== Awards and decorations ==
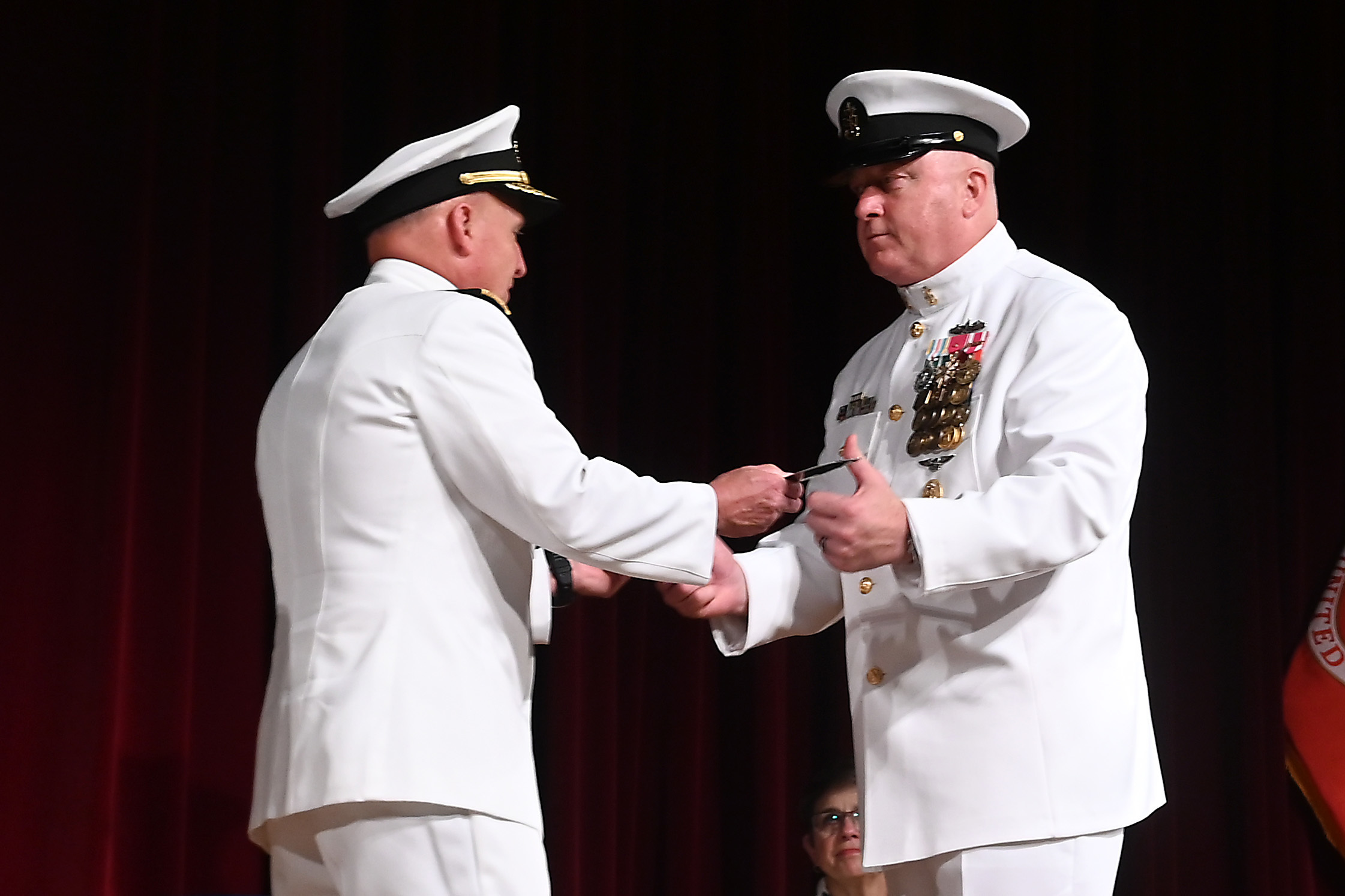
Honea receives the MCPON cutlass from Chief of Naval Operations Admiral Michael M. Gilday on September 8, 2022.

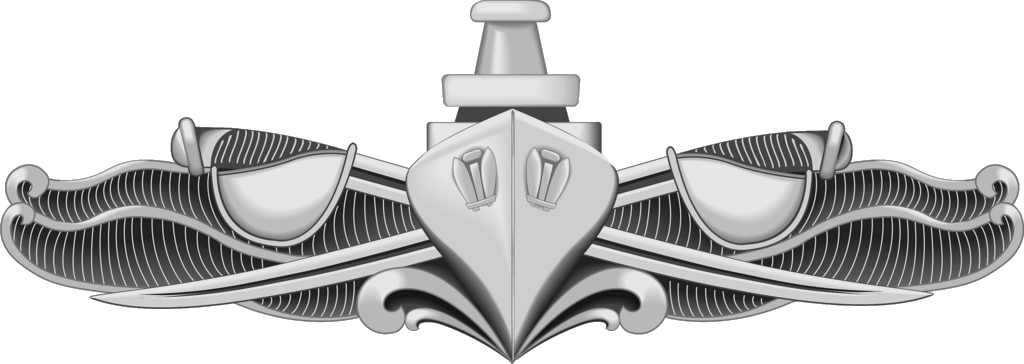

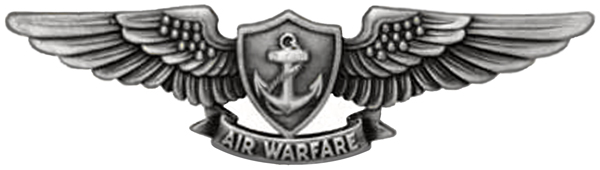

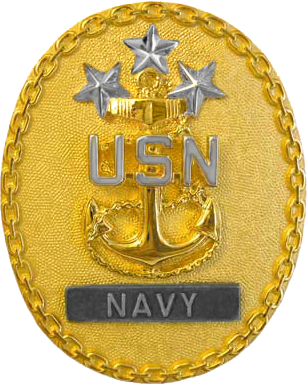

Badge	Enlisted Surface Warfare Specialist insignia		
1st row	Defense Superior Service Medal	Legion of Merit with one gold award star	Meritorious Service Medal with four award stars
2nd row	Navy and Marine Corps Commendation Medal with three award stars	Navy and Marine Corps Achievement Medal with three award stars	Joint Meritorious Unit Award
3rd row	Navy Unit Commendation with one bronze service star	Navy Meritorious Unit Commendation with one bronze service star	Navy "E" Ribbon w/ Wreathed Battle E device
4th row	Navy Good Conduct Medal with two silver service stars	National Defense Service Medal with service star	Armed Forces Expeditionary Medal
5th row	Southwest Asia Service Medal with two service stars	Afghanistan Campaign Medal with service star	Global War on Terrorism Expeditionary Medal with service star
6th row	Global War on Terrorism Service Medal	Korea Defense Service Medal	Humanitarian Service Medal
7th row	Navy Sea Service Deployment Ribbon with one silver and four bronze service stars	Navy Reserve Sea Service Deployment Ribbon	Navy & Marine Corps Overseas Service Ribbon with two service stars
8th row	NATO Medal (Non-Article 5)	Navy Expert Rifleman Medal	Navy Expert Pistol Shot Medal
Badge	Enlisted Aviation Warfare Specialist insignia		
Badge	Master Chief Petty Officer of the Navy Badge		

- Nine gold service stripes

Military offices
Preceded by Russell L. Smith	Master Chief Petty Officer of the Navy; 2022–2025	Succeeded by John J. Perryman IV
