= Intelligence specialist =

United States Navy occupational rating

Intelligence Specialist
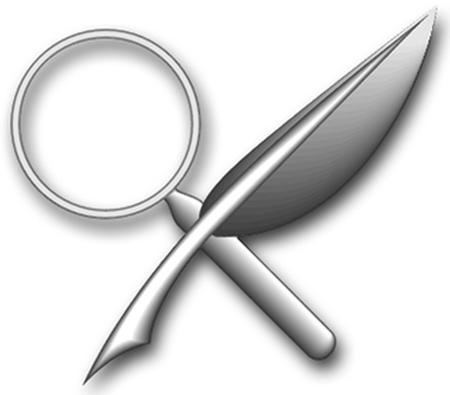
- Rating Insignia
- Issued by: United States Navy
- Type: Enlisted rating
- Abbreviation: IS
- Specialty: Information Warfare

Intelligence Specialist (IS) is a United States Navy enlisted rating within the Information Warfare community. The Intelligence Specialist rating was established in 1975 by combining the Photographic Intelligenceman (PT) rating (first established in 1957) and parts of the Yeoman (YN) rating. Initial training ("A" School) was conducted at Lowry Air Force Base in Aurora, Colorado until 1986 when the school was moved to the Navy Marine Corps Intelligence Training Center (NMITC) in Dam Neck, VA. As of September 2018, there are roughly 2950 enlisted Intelligence Specialists in the US Navy.

== General description ==
Military intelligence is a discipline utilized to collect information for decision makers within the military. Intelligence Specialists analyze information from all forms of intelligence (OSINT, HUMINT, SIGINT, etc.) and interpret their value for decision makers. Intelligence Specialists present their information compiled through intelligence briefings and maps.

== Notable Intelligence Specialists ==
- Chris Kyle (1974 - 2013) - former Intelligence Specialist turned United States Navy SEAL sniper
- Lt. Duane L. “Sam” Gillette (1956 - 2022) - Intelligence Specialist taken hostage during the Iran Hostage Crisis
- Russell L. Smith - 15th Master Chief Petty Officer of the Navy (MCPON)
