= John Perryman =

American naval non-commissioned officer

John J. Perryman IV
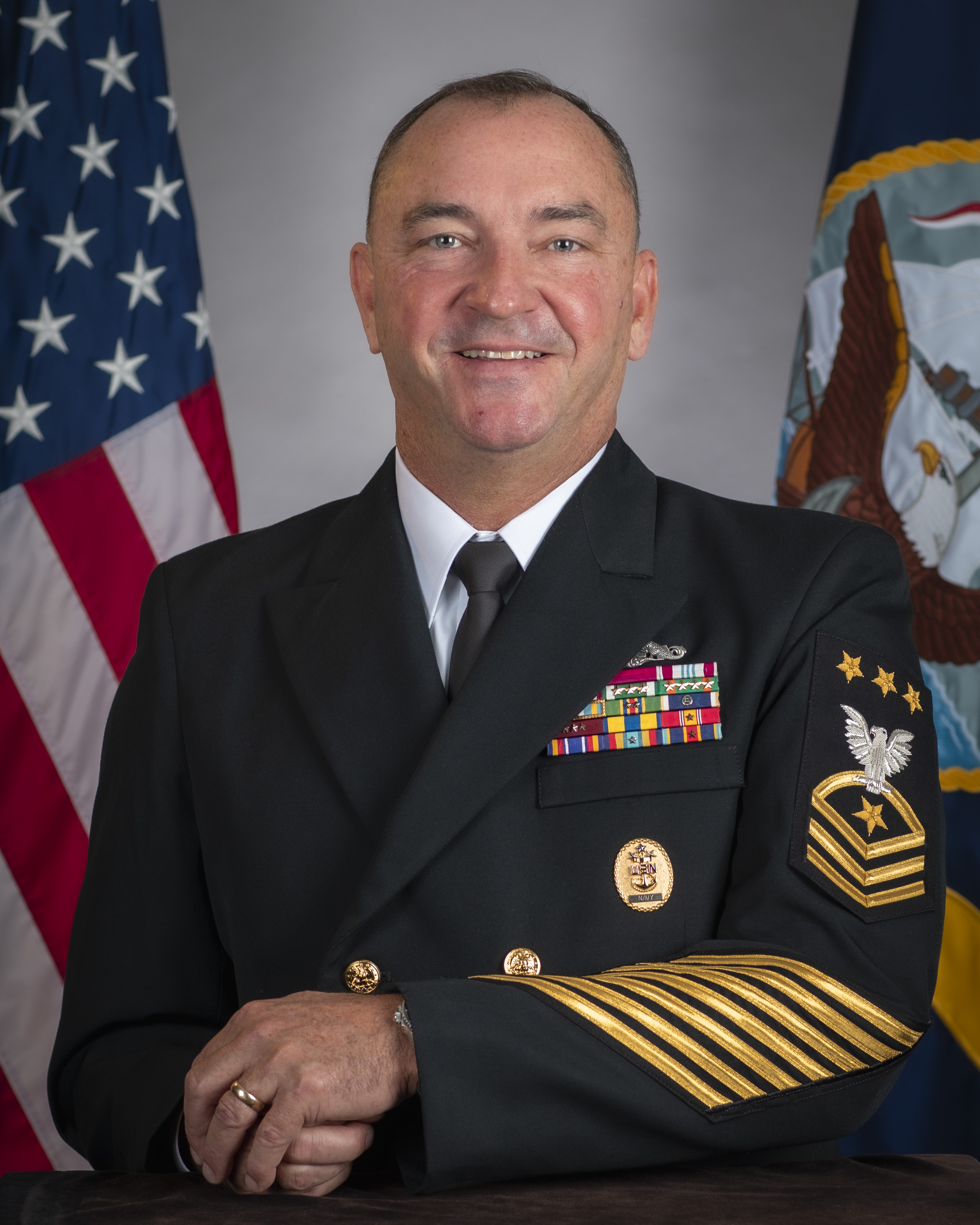
- Perryman in 2025
- Military career
- Allegiance: United States
- Branch: United States Navy
- Service years: 1994–present
- Rank: Master Chief Petty Officer of the Navy
- Awards: Defense Superior Service Medal; Legion of Merit; Defense Meritorious Service Medal; Meritorious Service Medal (2); Navy and Marine Corps Commendation Medal (4); Navy and Marine Corps Achievement Medal (5)

John J. Perryman IV is a senior sailor of the United States Navy currently serving as the 17th Master Chief Petty Officer of the Navy since 2025. He previously served as command senior enlisted leader of United States Strategic Command and fleet master chief of United States Fleet Forces Command.

== Naval career ==
Perryman enlisted in the United States Navy in 1994, and completed basic training at Recruit Training Command Great Lakes. Following basic training, he completed Basic Enlisted Submarine School and further training to become an electronics technician.

Following his graduation, he served as an electronics technician on the submarines USS Bremerton, USS Dolphin, and USS Cheyenne. He went on to serve as command master chief of the USS Hawaii, as well in command enlisted roles for Commander, Submarine Force, U.S. Pacific Fleet, Submarine Squadron 7, Commander, Submarine Force Atlantic, and United States Strategic Command.

=== Master Chief Petty Officer of the Navy ===
Perryman was announced as the 17th Master Chief Petty Officer of the Navy in August 2025, and assumed the role on September 8. He identified his priorities as improving housing and barracks, ensuring timely access to medical care, and developing additional continuing education and technical training opportunities. Alongside the Chief of Naval Operations, he has expressed a willingness to allow sailors to make DIY repairs to their barracks and living quarters.

== Awards and decorations ==
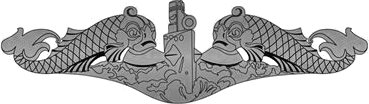

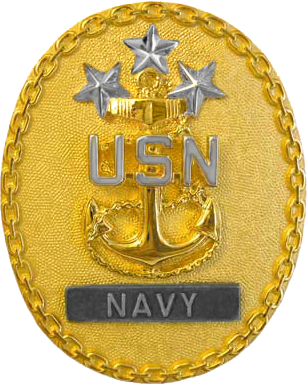

Badge	Enlisted Submarine Warfare Insignia		
1st row	Defense Superior Service Medal	Legion of Merit	Defense Meritorious Service Medal
2nd row	Meritorious Service Medal with award star	Navy and Marine Corps Commendation Medal with three award stars	Navy and Marine Corps Achievement Medal with four award stars
3rd row	Joint Meritorious Unit Award	Navy Meritorious Unit Commendation with two bronze service stars	Navy "E" Ribbon w/ Wreathed Battle E device
4th row	Navy Good Conduct Medal with one silver service star and two bronze service stars	Navy Expeditionary Medal	National Defense Service Medal with bronze service star
5th row	Global War on Terrorism Service Medal	Navy Sea Service Deployment Ribbon with silver service star	Navy & Marine Corps Overseas Service Ribbon
Badge	Master Chief Petty Officer of the Navy Badge		

- Seven gold service stripes

Military offices
Preceded by James Honea	Master Chief Petty Officer of the Navy; 2025–present	Incumbent
