= Delbert Black =

1st Master Chief Petty Officer of the US Navy

Delbert D. Black
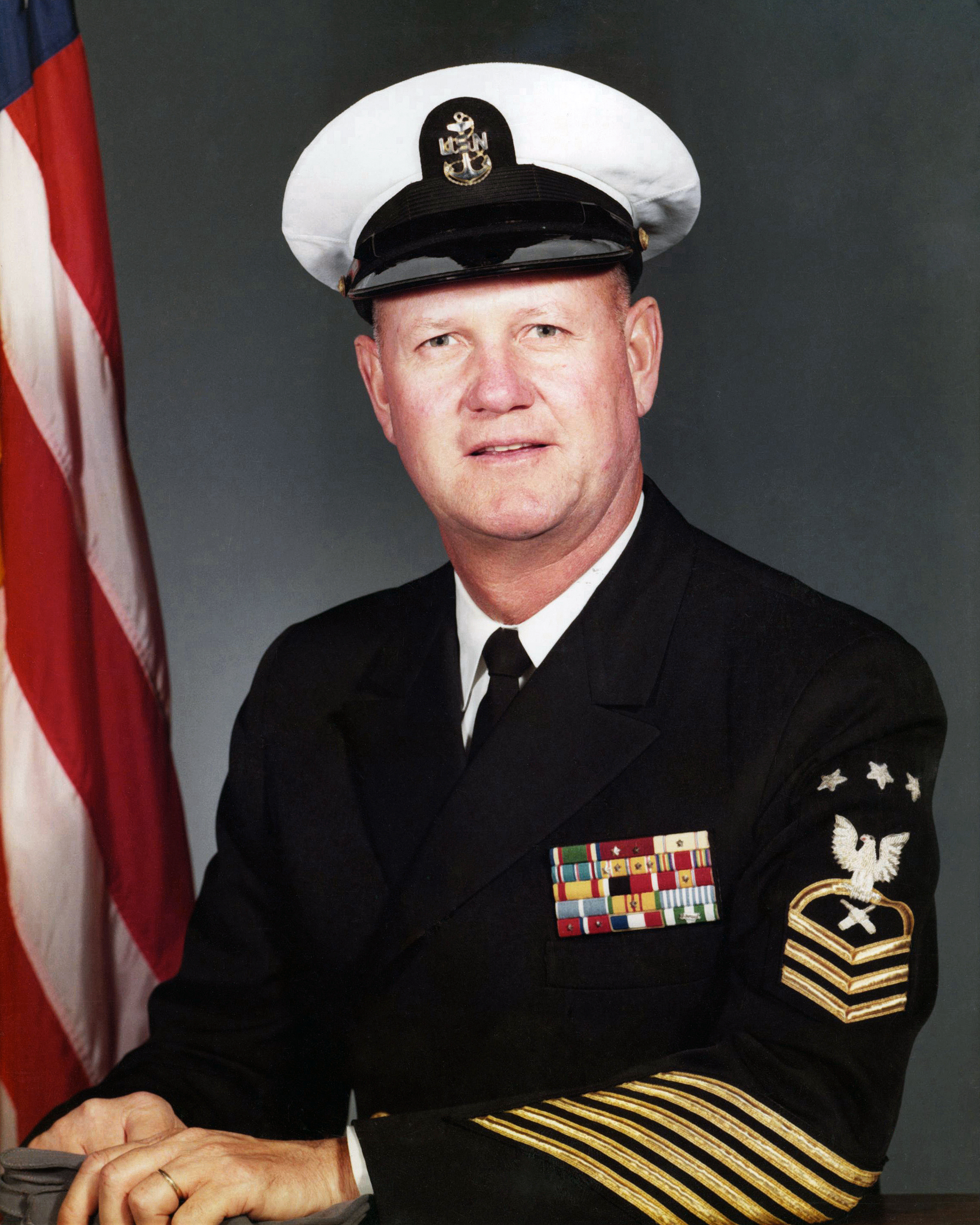
- 1st Master Chief Petty Officer of the Navy
- Born: 11 July 1922; Orr, Oklahoma, US
- Died: 5 March 2000 (aged 77); Winter Park, Florida, US
- Burial place: Arlington National Cemetery
- Military career
- Allegiance: United States
- Branch: United States Navy
- Service years: 1941–1971 (30 years)
- Rank: Master Chief Petty Officer of the Navy
- Commands: Master Chief Petty Officer of the Navy
- Conflicts: World War II; Attack on Pearl Harbor
- Awards: Navy Distinguished Service Medal

Delbert D. Black (11 July 1922 – 5 March 2000) was a senior sailor in the United States Navy who served as the first Master Chief Petty Officer of the Navy from 13 January 1967 to 1 April 1971.

== Early life and family ==
Black was born in Orr, Oklahoma, graduating from high school in 1940. He enlisted in the United States Navy on 14 March 1941. Delbert "Del" Black was married to Ima Black for 50 years and had a son Donny D. Black. Grandfather to Dylan and Nathan Black.

== Naval career ==
Upon completion of recruit training in San Diego, Black was assigned to the USS Maryland (BB-46) and was aboard during the attack on Pearl Harbor on 7 December 1941. He later served at Receiving Station, Pearl Harbor; USS Doyle C. Barnes (DE-353); Naval Air Base Samar, Philippines; USS Gardiners Bay (AVP-39), USS Boxer (CVA-21); USS Antietam (CVA-36); U.S. Navy Ceremonial Guard, Washington, D.C.; Yokosuka, Japan ship repair facilities; USS Brush (DD-745); USS Carpenter (DDE-825); USS Norfolk (DL-1); Recruiting Duty, Columbia, Tennessee; USS Springfield (CL-66); USS Independence (CV-62); and Fleet Anti-Air Warfare Training Center (FAAWTC), Dam Neck, Virginia. During his career, he advanced from striking for the rate of Gunner's Mate to the rank of Master Chief.

=== Master Chief Petty Officer of the Navy ===
On 13 January 1967, the Secretary of the Navy announced the appointment of Master Chief Gunner's Mate (GMCM) Black as the first Senior Enlisted Advisor, the position that would evolve into Master Chief Petty Officer of the Navy. As such, he was the highest rated enlisted man in the United States Navy, serving as the enlisted representative to the Chief of Naval Operations. His function was to counsel the highest ranks of the Navy on issues associated with enlisted guidance, leadership, and policy. Black was the first enlisted man to write a foreword for The Bluejacket's Manual.

== Retirement and later work ==
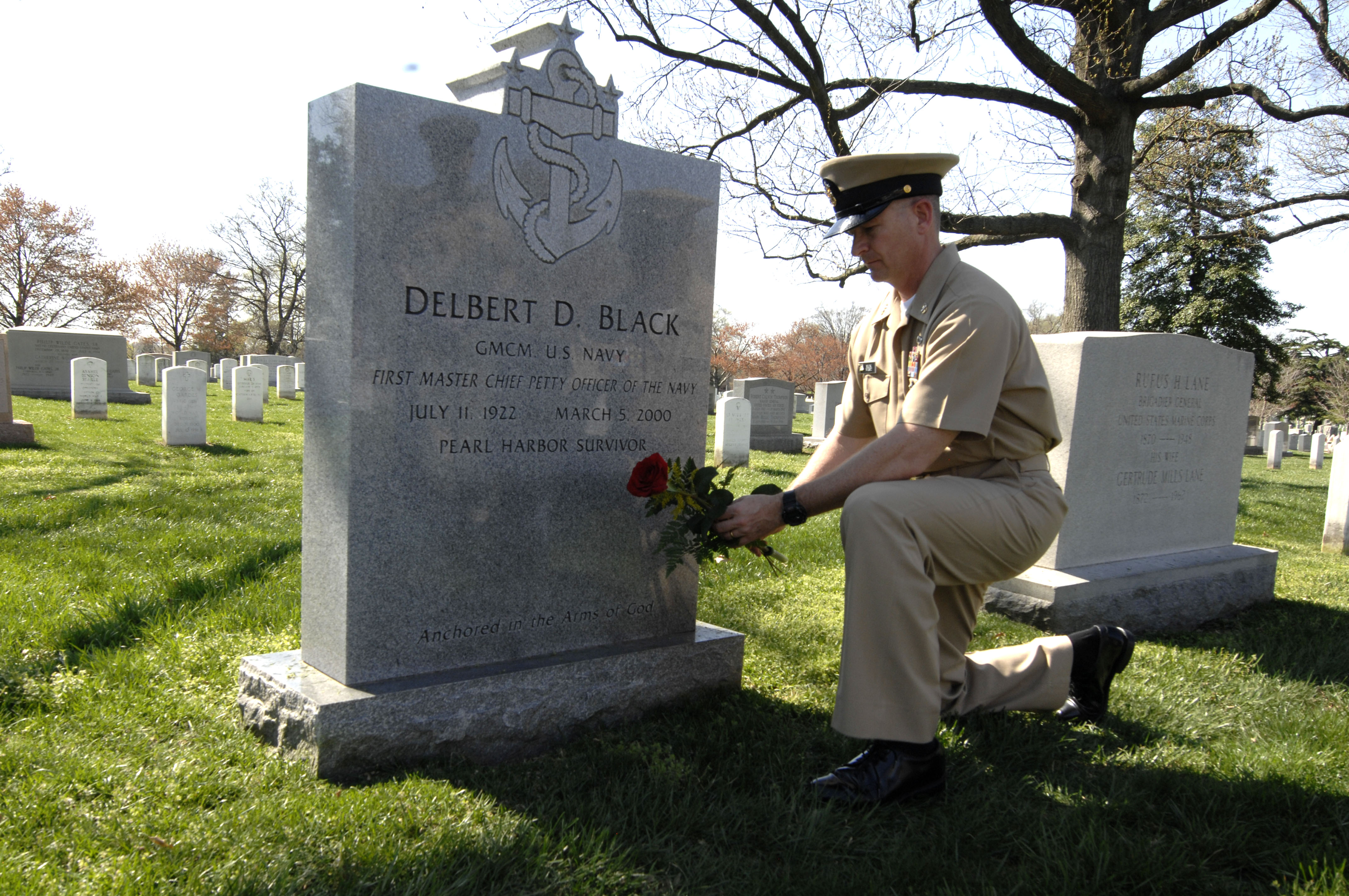
The twelfth Master Chief Petty Officer of the Navy (MCPON) Rick D. West lays a single red rose at the gravesite of the first MCPON Delbert Black at Arlington National Cemetery.

Upon retirement from active duty, Black continued his involvement with the Navy through retired and active duty organizations. He was an active member of the USO Council of Central Florida; the Fleet Reserve Association; and co-chairman on the Secretary of Navy Committee on Retired Personnel. He died at his home in Winter Park, Florida from a heart attack at the age of 77. He is buried in Arlington National Cemetery, Section 11, Site 496 LH.

At a 13 March 2015 ceremony at the Navy Memorial in Washington, D.C., Navy Secretary Ray Mabus and Master Chief Petty Officer of the Navy (AW/NAC) Michael D. Stevens announced that an Arleigh Burke-class destroyer, USS Delbert D. Black, would honor Delbert Black.

== Awards and decorations ==

1st Row	Navy Distinguished Service Medal (Master Chief Black was the first Navy enlisted man to receive this award.)	Combat Action Ribbon	Navy Unit Commendation
2nd Row	Navy Good Conduct Medal (with 6 service stars)	China Service Medal	American Defense Service Medal (with 1 campaign star)
3rd Row	American Campaign Medal	Asiatic-Pacific Campaign Medal (with 8 campaign stars)	World War II Victory Medal
4th Row	Navy Occupation Service Medal	National Defense Service Medal (with 1 service star)	Korean Service Medal
5th Row	Antarctica Service Medal	Vietnam Service Medal with service star	Philippine Presidential Unit Citation
6th Row	Korean Presidential Unit Citation	Vietnam Gallantry Cross Unit Citation	Philippine Liberation Medal (with 2 service stars)
7th Row	United Nations Korea Medal	Vietnam Campaign Medal	Korean War Service Medal

- 7 gold Service stripes.

Military offices
New title	Master Chief Petty Officer of the Navy; 13 January 1967 – 1 April 1971	Succeeded by John Whittet
