= Russell L. Smith =

15th Master Chief Petty Officer of the US Navy

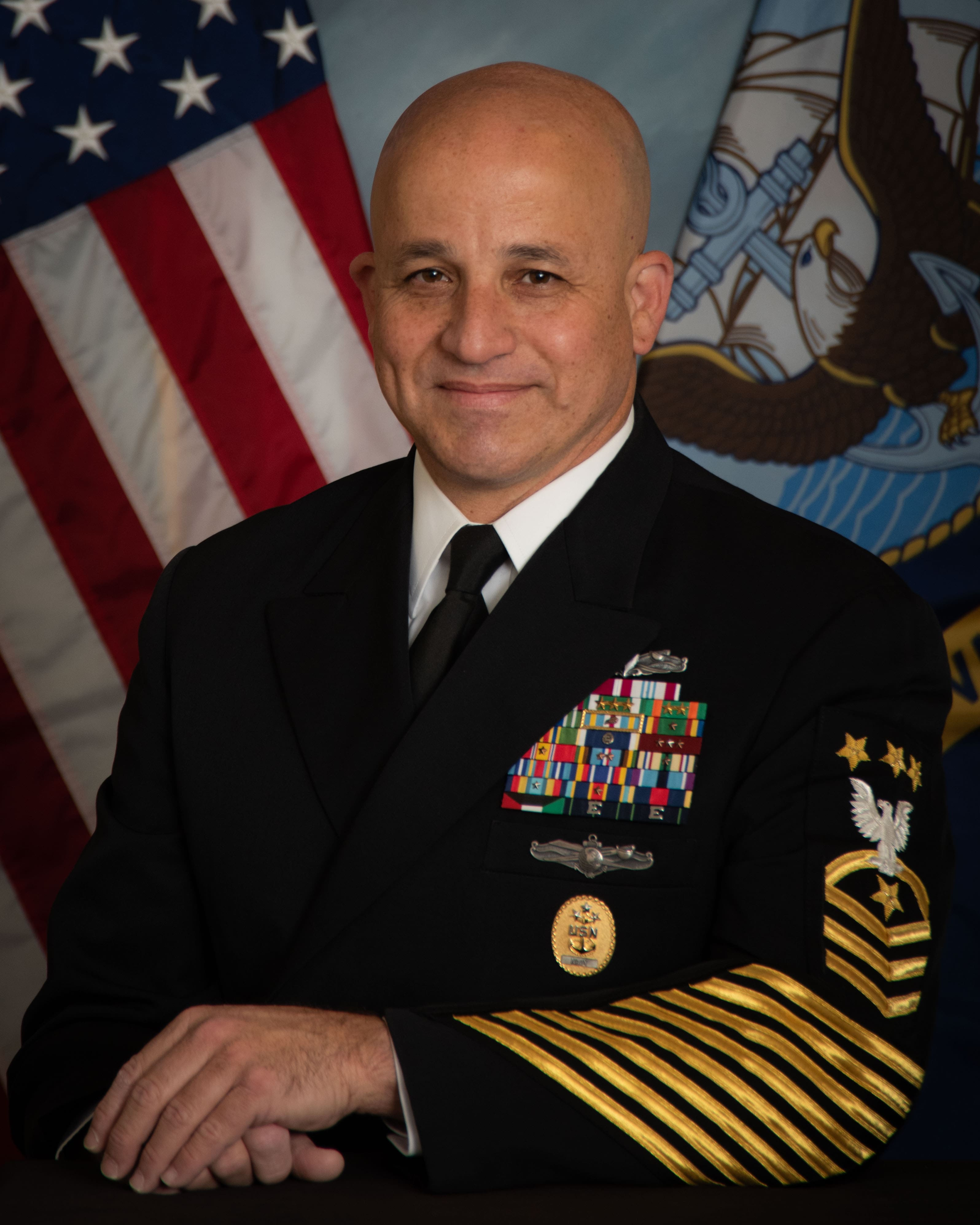
- Smith in April 2021
- Military career
- Allegiance: United States
- Branch: United States Navy
- Service years: 1988–2022
- Rank: Master Chief Petty Officer of the Navy
- Commands: Master Chief Petty Officer of the Navy
- Conflicts: Gulf War
- Awards: Legion of Merit (3); Defense Meritorious Service Medal; Meritorious Service Medal; Navy and Marine Corps Commendation Medal (4); Navy and Marine Corps Achievement Medal (3); Army Achievement Medal

Russell L. Smith is a United States Navy sailor who served as the 15th Master Chief Petty Officer of the Navy (MCPON). He was acting MCPON from June 22, 2018, when Steven S. Giordano resigned, to August 29, 2018, when he officially assumed the role.

== Naval career ==
Smith is a graduate of the United States Navy Senior Enlisted Academy (Class 125/Blue) and the Command Master Chief/Chief of the Boat (CMC/COB) Course (Class 42) at the Naval War College.

Smith reported to Recruit Training Center San Diego, California, in September 1988, and began his career as a airman. He became a weapons technician in 1990, then converted to the intelligence specialist rating in 1993. He was selected for the command master chief program in 2007.

Smith's sea duty assignments include USS Enterprise (CVN-65), SEAL Team Four, USS Carl Vinson (CVN-70), two tours on USS Abraham Lincoln (CVN-72), and as the command master chief on USS Momsen (DDG-92).

Smith had six shipboard deployments to the western Pacific and Central Command area of responsibility in support of operations Desert Storm and Desert Fox, a 292-day deployment during operations Enduring Freedom and Iraqi Freedom, disaster relief operations in Indonesia and counter-piracy operations in the Horn of Africa. He also served on numerous deployments and detachments while attached to Naval Special Warfare and Defense Intelligence Agency elements.

Smith's shore tours include service as the operations non-commissioned officer at the United States Defense Attaché Office in Moscow, Russia; on the Chief of Naval Operations' staff as the senior enlisted for the intelligence community; as the CMC for the Office of Naval Intelligence; as the OPNAV Staff's command master chief in Washington, DC; as the United States Naval Academy's command master chief in Annapolis, and most recently as the fleet master chief, Manpower, Personnel, Training, and Education in January 2017.

In February 2022, it was made public that Smith was under investigation by the Naval Inspector General for unspecified misconduct.

On 22 April 2022, he visited the carrier USS George Washington (CVN-73) after several crew members had committed suicide over the previous ten months, including three in one week earlier in the month. The ship has been at Newport News for a major mid-life overhaul since 2017, and many of the crew have reported life aboard the ship difficult due to the construction-like atmosphere, and the lengthy commute some of them must take daily. After his meeting with the crew, several of them reported feeling unsatisfied with the responses from Smith to their concerns. For example, after sailors complained that they had been unable to sleep due to construction noises related to the RCOH, Smith told them to have "reasonable expectations" and to remember that they were not "sleeping in a foxhole like a Marine might be doing."

He vacated the MCPON office on September 8, 2022 to Fleet Master Chief James Honea.

== Awards and decorations ==
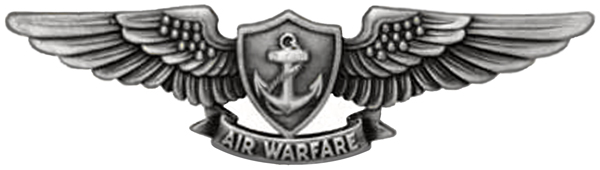
Enlisted Aviation Warfare Specialist insignia
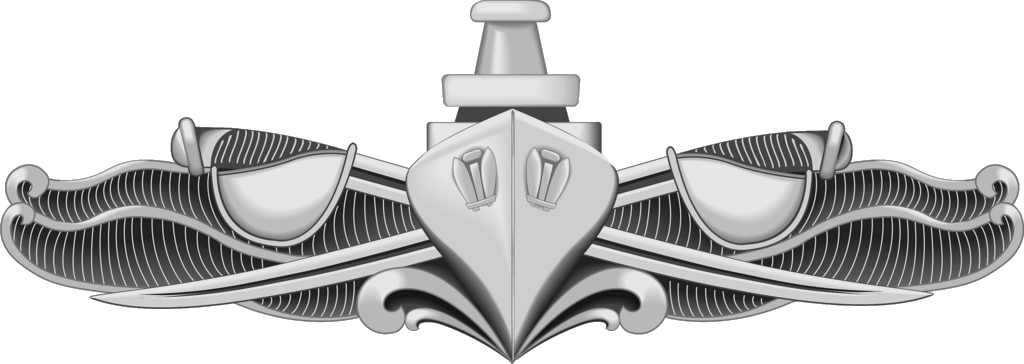
Enlisted Surface Warfare Specialist insignia
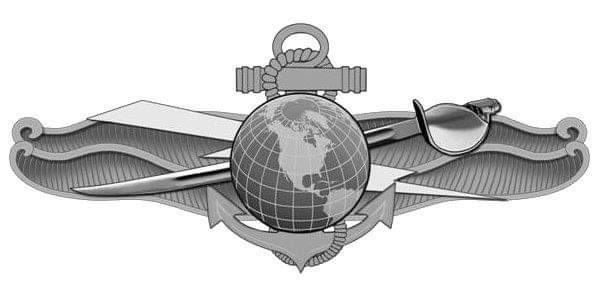
Enlisted Information Dominance Warfare Specialist insignia

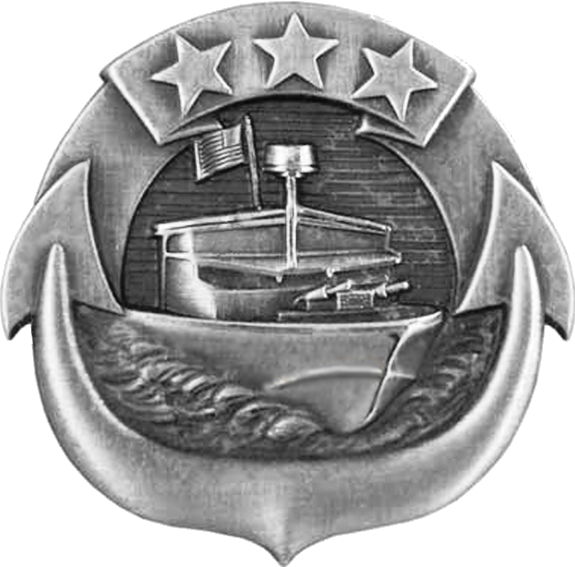

US Navy Small Craft Pin
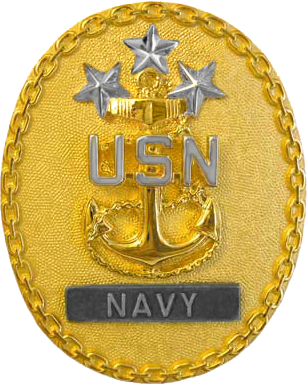
Master Chief Petty Officer of the Navy Badge

Navy Distinguished Service Medal
Legion of Merit with two gold award stars
Defense Meritorious Service Medal
Meritorious Service Medal with one award star
Navy and Marine Corps Commendation Medal with three award stars
Navy and Marine Corps Achievement Medal with two award stars
Army Achievement Medal
Joint Meritorious Unit Award with one bronze oak leaf cluster
Navy Unit Commendation with one bronze service star
Navy Meritorious Unit Commendation
Navy "E" Ribbon w/ Wreathed Battle E device
Navy Good Conduct Medal with one silver and two bronze service stars
National Defense Service Medal with service star
Armed Forces Expeditionary Medal with two service stars
Southwest Asia Service Medal with service star
Global War on Terrorism Expeditionary Medal
Global War on Terrorism Service Medal
Humanitarian Service Medal
Navy Sea Service Deployment Ribbon with silver service star
Navy & Marine Corps Overseas Service Ribbon with service star
Navy Accession Training Service Ribbon
Kuwait Liberation Medal from Kuwait
Navy Expert Rifleman Medal
Navy Expert Pistol Shot Medal

- Eight gold service stripes.
- Smith received the Edwin T. Layton Leadership Award in fall of 2002 for leadership in the Intelligence Community.

Military offices
Preceded by Steven S. Giordano	Master Chief Petty Officer of the Navy; 2018–2022	Succeeded by James Honea
