= Master Chief Petty Officer of the Navy =

Senior enlisted member of the US Navy

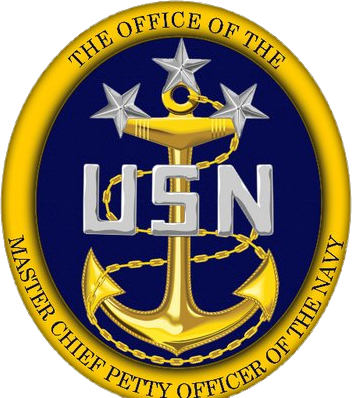
- Seal

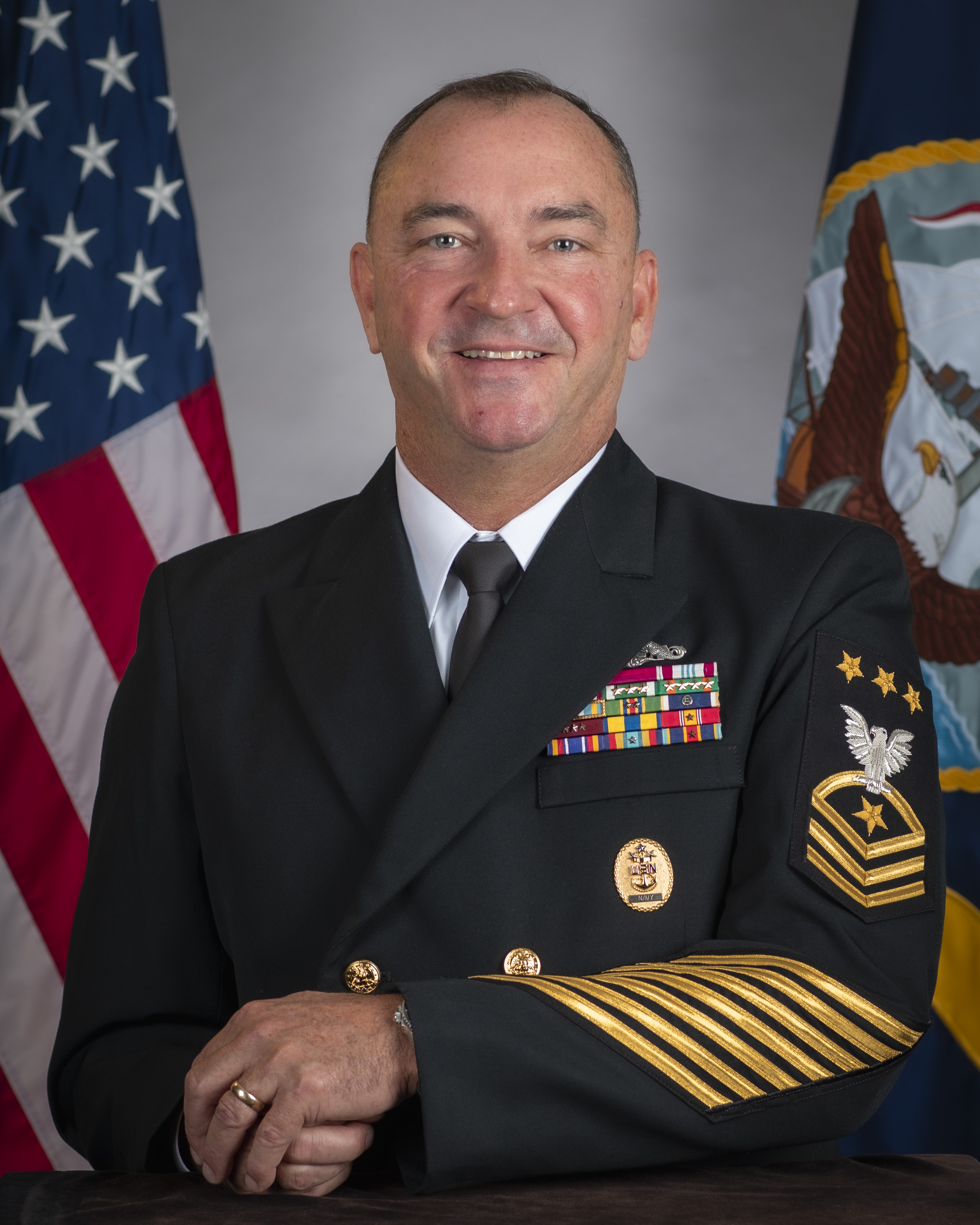
- Incumbent; John J. Perryman IV since 13 September 2025
- United States Navy
- Type: Advisor
- Abbreviation: MCPON
- Reports to: Chief of Naval Operations
- Appointer: Chief of Naval Operations
- Term length: 2 years; renewable once
- Formation: 28 April 1967; 59 years ago
- First holder: Delbert Black
- Deputy: Deputy Master Chief Petty Officer of the Navy
- Salary: $10,758.00 per month, regardless of the incumbent's service longevity
- Website: Official website

The master chief petty officer of the Navy (MCPON /ˈmɪkpɒn/) is a unique non-commissioned rank and position of office of the United States Navy, which is designated as a special paygrade above E-9. The holder of this position is the most senior enlisted member of the U.S. Navy, equivalent to the sergeant major of the Army, chief master sergeant of the Air Force, sergeant major of the Marine Corps, master chief petty officer of the Coast Guard, and chief master sergeant of the Space Force. The holder of this rank and position is typically the most senior enlisted sailor in the Navy, unless an enlisted sailor is serving as the senior enlisted advisor to the chairman. The current MCPON is John Perryman.

The master chief petty officer of the Navy is appointed by the chief of naval operations to serve as a spokesperson to address the issues of enlisted personnel to the highest positions in the Navy. As such, they are the senior enlisted advisor to the chief of naval operations and to the chief of naval personnel. Their exact duties vary, depending on the CNO, though they generally devote much of their time to traveling throughout the Navy observing training and talking to sailors and their families. Their personnel code is N00D as the senior enlisted advisor to Chief of Naval Operations and PERS-00D in their special advisory capacity to Chief of Naval Personnel/Deputy Chief of Naval Operations (Manpower, Personnel, and Training). In 1988, the MCPON's spouse was made the Ombudsman-at-Large, authorizing them to travel around the fleet with their spouse, representing the interests of the spouses of enlisted members. The MCPON serves an appointed two-year term of office but can be reappointed by the CNO for an additional two-year term. Typically; the MCPON serves two terms. While the MCPON is a non-commissioned officer, this rank is protocoled higher than all rear admirals and equivalent to a vice admiral in billet, seating, transportation, and parking.

== Origin ==
In 1966, the opportunity was given to sailors in the U.S. Navy's two largest areas of concentration, Hampton Roads, Virginia, and San Diego County, California, to voice their concerns, complaints, and recommendations to the top levels of the U.S. Navy. The response was overwhelming; naval leaders realized that they were out of touch with the desires of enlisted sailors. To provide a permanent channel for input from the enlisted force to their senior leadership, the Navy acted on a suggestion to create a "Leading Chief Petty Officer of the Navy" who would have a direct dialogue channel with all enlisted sailors and represent their interests. Initially, the post was known as the senior enlisted advisor of the Navy, and on 13 January 1967 GMCM Delbert Black was selected to serve a four-year term in that capacity. On 28 April of the same year, Black's title was changed to Master Chief Petty Officer of the Navy to bring the Navy in line with the U.S. Marine Corps and U.S. Army, which had created equivalent positions in 1957 and July 1966 respectively. MCPON Black's duties were to the Chief of Naval Personnel. All subsequent MCPONs have reported to both the CNO and CNP.

Master Chief Petty Officer of the Navy
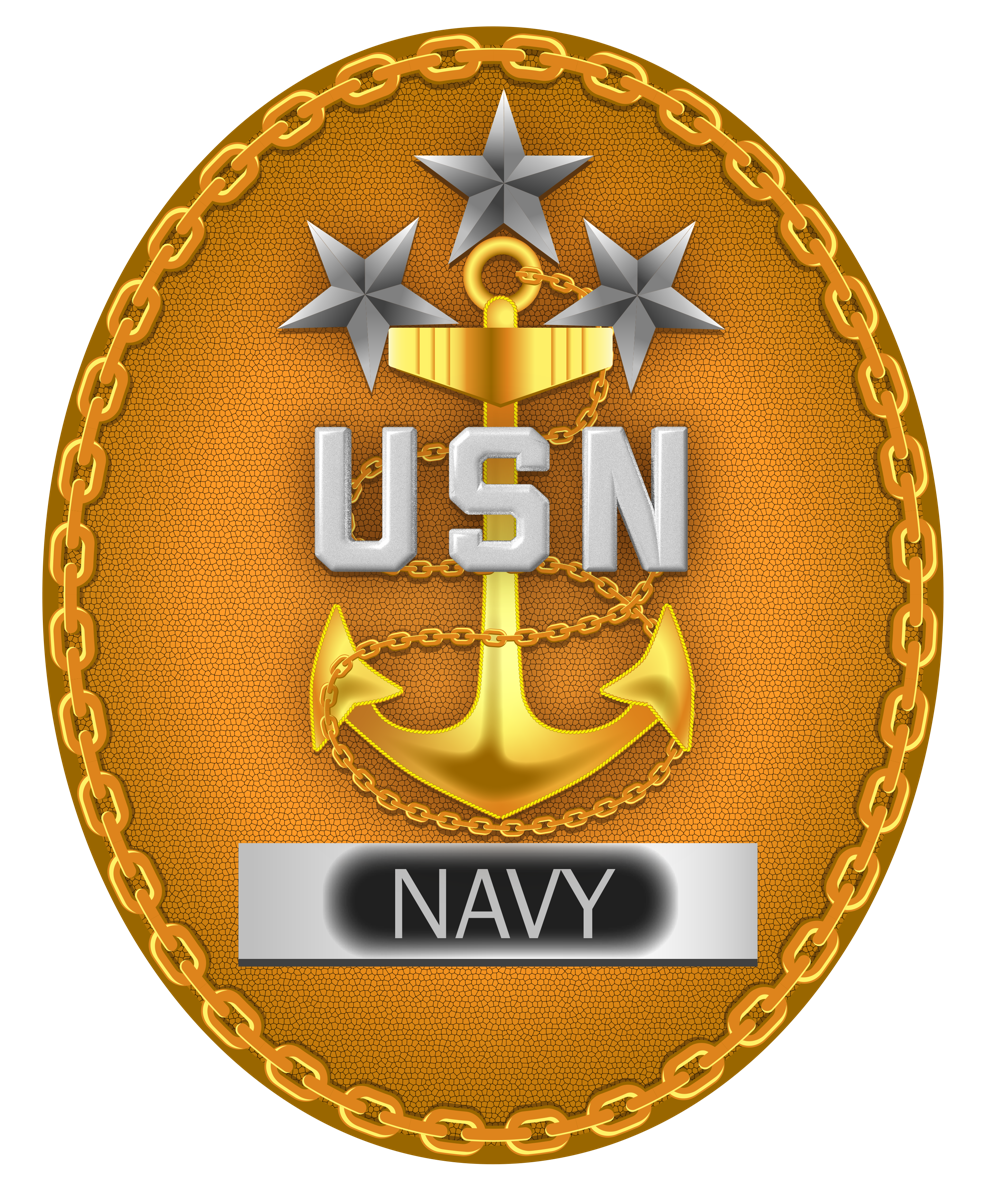
- MCPON Insignia sleeve, cap/collar, shirt, badge
- Country: United States
- Service branch: United States Navy
- Abbreviation: MCPON
- Rank group: Senior Enlisted Advisor
- NATO rank code: OR-9
- Pay grade: Special
- Formation: 1967
- Next higher rank: Senior Enlisted Advisor to the Chairman
- Next lower rank: Command master chief petty officer
- Equivalent ranks: Sergeant Major of the Army; Sergeant Major of the Marine Corps; Chief Master Sergeant of the Air Force; Chief Master Sergeant of the Space Force; Master Chief Petty Officer of the Coast Guard

== MCPON rate insignia ==
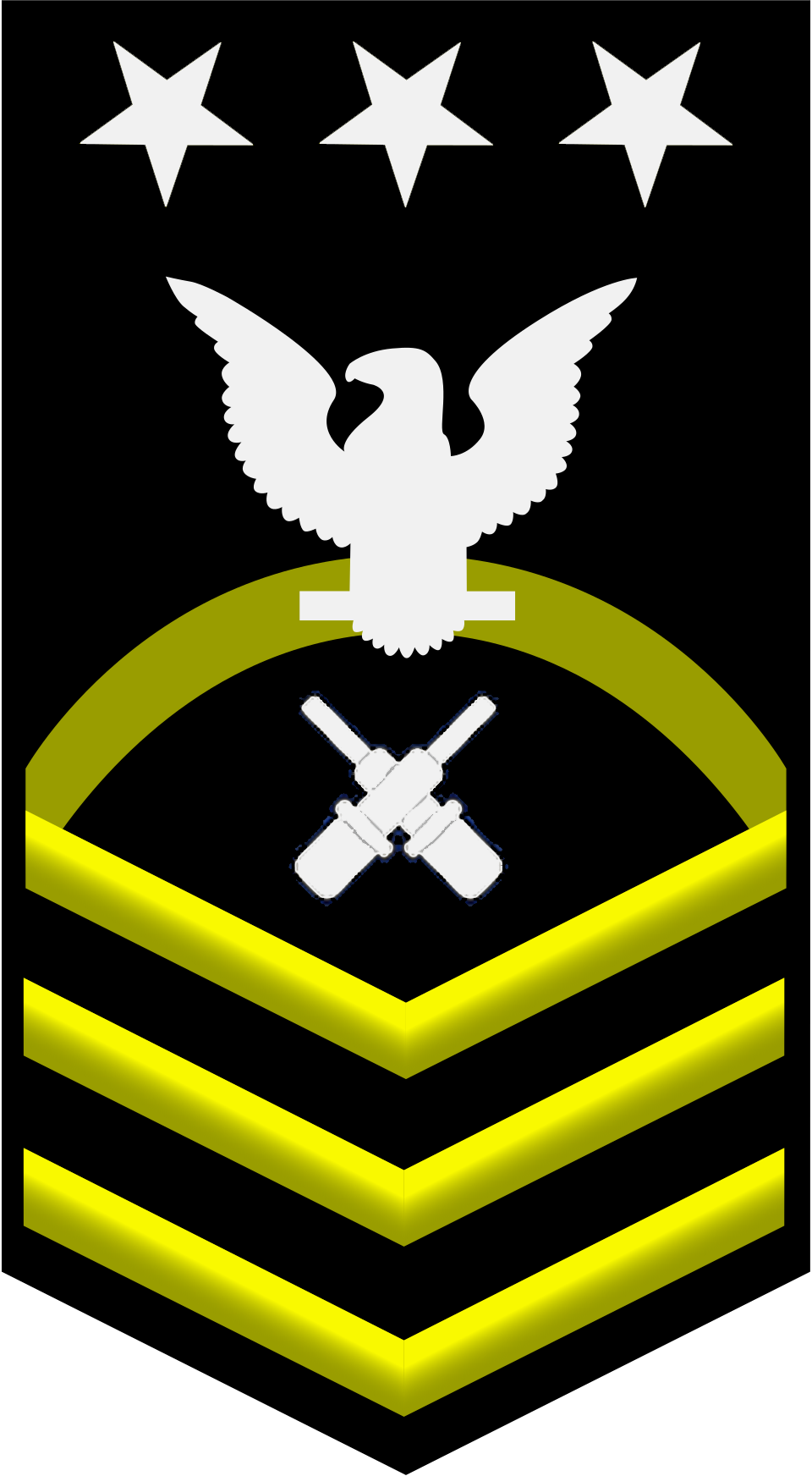
MCPON Delbert Black's rank insignia.

MCPON Delbert Black altered his Chief Gunner's Mate insignia and added a third silver star to the rating badge. Black's wife had been the one who suggested the third star not only on the rating badge, but also the cap and collar insignia. The uniform board agreed.

In 1971, the MCPON's rating specialty mark was replaced by a single inverted gold star as well as the stars being changed to gold.

Thomas S. Crow was the first MCPON to wear the MCPON identification badge.

== List of master chief petty officers of the Navy ==
| No. | Portrait | MCPON | Took office | Left office | Time in office |
|---|---|---|---|---|---|
| 1 | Delbert Black | MCPON; Delbert Black (1922–2000) | 13 January 1967 | 1 April 1971 | 4 years, 79 days |
| 2 | John "Jack" Whittet | MCPON; John "Jack" Whittet (1925–1989) | 1 April 1971 | 25 September 1975 | 4 years, 177 days |
| 3 | Robert Walker | MCPON; Robert Walker (1929–2016) | 25 September 1975 | 28 September 1979 | 4 years, 3 days |
| 4 | Thomas S. Crow | MCPON; Thomas S. Crow (1934–2008) | 28 September 1979 | 1 October 1982 | 3 years, 3 days |
| 5 | Billy C. Sanders | MCPON; Billy C. Sanders (1936–2026) | 1 October 1982 | 4 October 1985 | 3 years, 3 days |
| 6 | William H. Plackett | MCPON; William H. Plackett (1937–2016) | 4 October 1985 | 9 September 1988 | 2 years, 341 days |
| 7 | Duane R. Bushey | MCPON (AW); Duane R. Bushey (born 1944) | 9 September 1988 | 28 August 1992 | 3 years, 354 days |
| 8 | John Hagan | MCPON (SW); John Hagan (born 1946) | 28 August 1992 | 27 March 1998 | 5 years, 211 days |
| 9 | James L. Herdt | MCPON (SS/SW/AW); James L. Herdt (born 1947) | 27 March 1998 | 22 April 2002 | 4 years, 26 days |
| 10 | Terry D. Scott | MCPON (SS/AW); Terry D. Scott | 22 April 2002 | 10 July 2006 | 4 years, 79 days |
| 11 | Joe R. Campa | MCPON (FMF/SW); Joe R. Campa | 10 July 2006 | 12 December 2008 | 2 years, 155 days |
| 12 | Rick D. West | MCPON (SS/SW); Rick D. West (born 1963) | 12 December 2008 | 28 September 2012 | 3 years, 291 days |
| 13 | Michael D. Stevens | MCPON (AW/NAC); Michael D. Stevens | 28 September 2012 | 2 September 2016 | 3 years, 340 days |
| 14 | Steven S. Giordano | MCPON (SG/SW/IW); Steven S. Giordano | 2 September 2016 | 21 June 2018 | 1 year, 292 days |
| - | Russell L. Smith | FLTCM (IW/SW/AW); Russell L. Smith; Acting | 21 June 2018 | 29 August 2018 | 69 days |
| 15 | Russell L. Smith | MCPON (IW/SW/AW); Russell L. Smith | 29 August 2018 | 8 September 2022 | 4 years, 10 days |
| 16 | James Honea | MCPON (SW/AW); James Honea | 8 September 2022 | 12 September 2025 | 3 years, 4 days |
| 17 | John J. Perryman IV | MCPON (SS); John J. Perryman IV | 13 September 2025 | Incumbent | 1 year, 57 days |

== See also ==
- Senior Enlisted Advisor to the Chairman
- Sergeant Major of the Army
- Command Sergeant Major of the US Army Reserve
- Sergeant Major of the Marine Corps
- Chief Master Sergeant of the Air Force
- Chief Master Sergeant of the Space Force
- Master Chief Petty Officer of the Coast Guard
- Master Chief Petty Officer of the Coast Guard Reserve Force
- Senior Enlisted Advisor for the National Guard Bureau
