= Fleet Reserve Association =

American Military Veterans Association

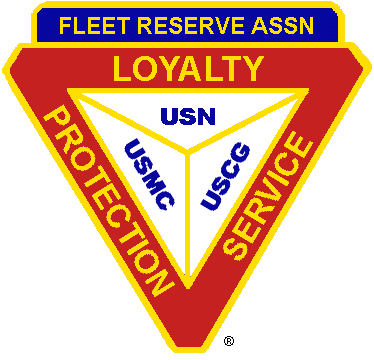
- FRA Emblem
- Established: November 11, 1924; 101 years ago
- Founded at: Philadelphia, Pennsylvania
- Type: 501(c)(19), veterans organization
- Tax ID no.: 53-0067600
- Headquarters: 1600 Duke Street, Suite 300, Alexandria, Virginia
- Coordinates: 38.4825°N 77.0315°W
- Region served: Worldwide
- National President: Sha'ron Martin (Virginia Beach, Virginia)
- Board of directors: National Executive Committee
- Key people: National Executive Director Donna Jansky
- Publication: FRAToday
- Subsidiaries: FRA Education Foundation; FRA Veteran Service Foundation; Auxiliary of the Fleet Reserve Association
- Website: www.fra.org

The Fleet Reserve Association (FRA) is a non-profit U.S. military and veterans organization headquartered in Alexandria, Virginia, chartered by the United States Congress that represents the interests of all members of the Navy, Coast Guard, and Marine veterans and active duty personnel in the United States.

FRA represents approximately; 277,428 active-duty members of the Navy, 163,346 active-duty of the Marine Corps and 40,000 active-duty of the Coast Guard The FRA was named after the US Navy retirement procedure "PERS 836". The organization was founded in Philadelphia in October 1922, by Chief Yeoman George L. Carlin, and it was chartered on November 11, 1924, by the U.S. Congress. The association is composed of branches located in each State, U.S. territory, and several overseas locations.

The guiding principles of the FRA are Loyalty, Protection and Service. In addition to organizing events, members provide assistance at VA hospitals and clinics. It is active in issue-oriented U.S. politics. Its primary political activity is advocating on behalf of the Sea Service personnel, including support for benefits such as pay and pensions. The organization has also prompts "Americanism and Patriotism" through its essay contest.

== History ==
1919: Chief Yeoman Robert W. White and Chief Gunner’s Mate Carl H. McDonald are the first enlisted personnel to testify before Congress. They present the enlisted perspective on military pay legislation.

1921: Chief Yeoman George Carlin conceives an association dedicated to monitoring all legislation that impacts enlisted personnel. Carlin is considered the father of the FRA.

1923: The Association’s Constitution and Bylaws Committee determined membership eligibility for the new organization. The document stated, “a shipmate is a shipmate, regardless of race, creed or color.”

Conceived as the U.S. Fleet Naval Reserve Association. The organization was chartered as Fleet Reserve Association under Title 36 of the United States Code. Officially chartered by the U.S. Congress.

1925: FRA adopts its cardinal principles of “Loyalty, Protection and Service” as its official motto.

1925: The Association holds its first national convention in the place of its birth — Philadelphia.

Founded as an association for enlisted career Navy, FRA expanded its membership to Marine enlisted personnel in January 1956. The cover of the Naval Affairs published by The Fleet Reserve Association "For Career Navy and Marine Corps Enlisted Personnel. (Volume 35, No. 1 January 1958) By March 1957 the cover statesmen read "The Magazine for Career Enlisted Men of the U.S. Navy and U.S. Marines Corps." (Naval Affairs, March 1957) The next significant change was in October 1970 when the cover statement was updates to The Magazine for Career Enlisted Personnel of the U.S Navy, Marine Corps and Coast Guard. The elimination of the word "Men" was significant as it opened FRA membership to enlisted women of the sea services.

The June 1971 issue of Naval Affairs announced the New National Emblem which included the initials USN USMC and USCG. The emblem was designed by Shipmate Willis H. Wolfe.

The Fleet Reserve Association Headquarters is located in Alexandria, Virginia. It is the primary office for the National President, and also is the Administrative Headquarters which houses the membership services and communications.

On 27 April 2023, Representatives Gus Bilirakis and John Garamendi introduced the bipartisan Fleet Reserve Association 100th Anniversary Act (H.R. 2929) with the proposal of commemorative $5 gold coins, silver dollars, and clad half dollars for the association's 2024 centennial.

On 11 November 2024, the FRA participated in the 71st annual National Veterans Day Observance at the Arlington National Cemetery.

== Advocacy ==
The FRA was a part of the organization that advocated for the Blue Water Navy Vietnam Veterans Act of 2019 which was signed on 25 June 2019.

On 10 February 2020, the FRA together with six other veteran organizations signed a letter to accelerate benefit eligibility for Agent Orange exposure which was presented to President Donald Trump.

The FRA was among the military and veteran organization that signed a letter urging leaders of the Senate to support restrictions on mandatory arbitration clauses involving service member contracts on 17 November 2021.

On 29 March 2022, the FRA took part in the Senate Veterans’ Affairs Committee hearing that examined the Honoring Our PACT Act, which was part of the congressional consideration of reforms about veterans’ military toxic exposures, eligibility for additional benefits and the implementation responsibilities of the Department of Veterans Affairs.

In October 2022, the FRA Director of Legislative Programs John Davis called for intensified action from the Navy to protect sailors from contaminated water incidents involving the USS Nimitz and USS Abraham Lincoln aircraft carriers.

In January 2026, the FRA became a member of the Star Act Alliance, which is made up of 15 veterans and military advocacy organization in support of the Major Richard Star Act. On 3 March 2026, FRA National President Richard Fetro testified in support of the legislation at a joint congressional veterans' affairs hearing.

In May 2026, the FRA endorsed the MISSION RX Act, which would allow TRICARE beneficiaries and Department of Veterans Affairs patients to obtain prescription medications at the loser Medicare-negotiated price.

== Notable Members ==
Notable members of The Fleet Reserve Association have included:

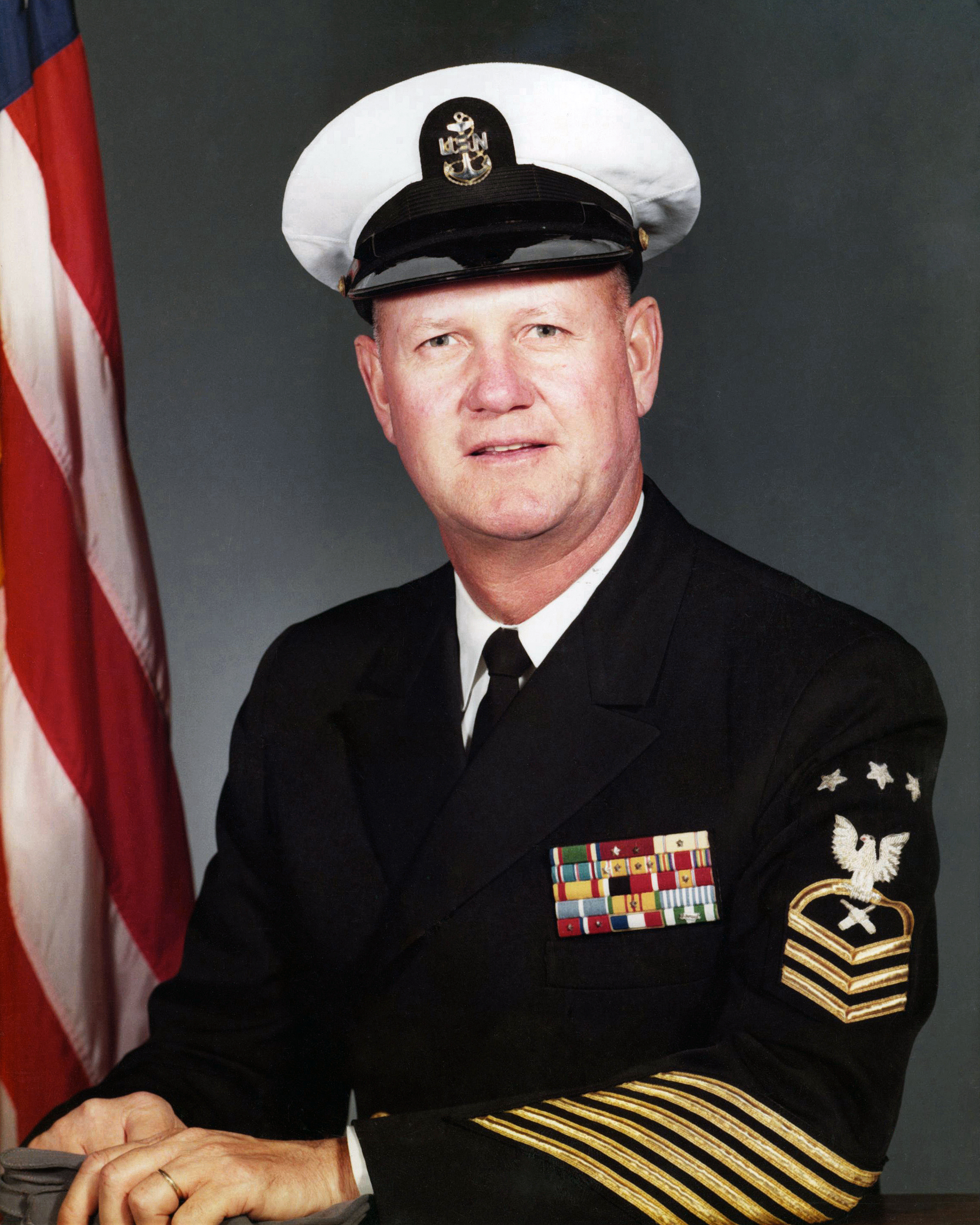
Dilbert Black, First Master Chief Petty Officer of the Navy

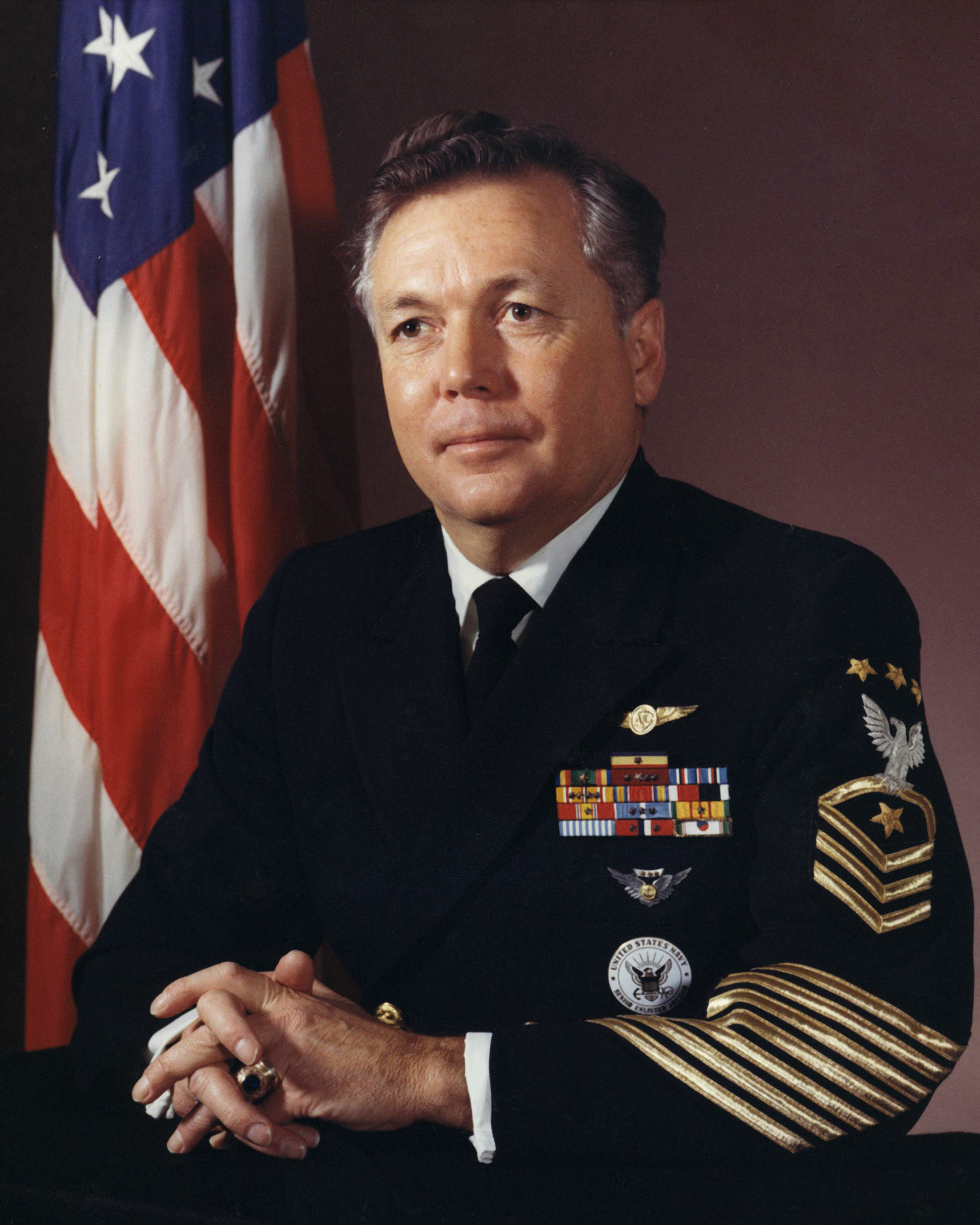
John Whittet, Second Master Chief Petty Officer of the Navy

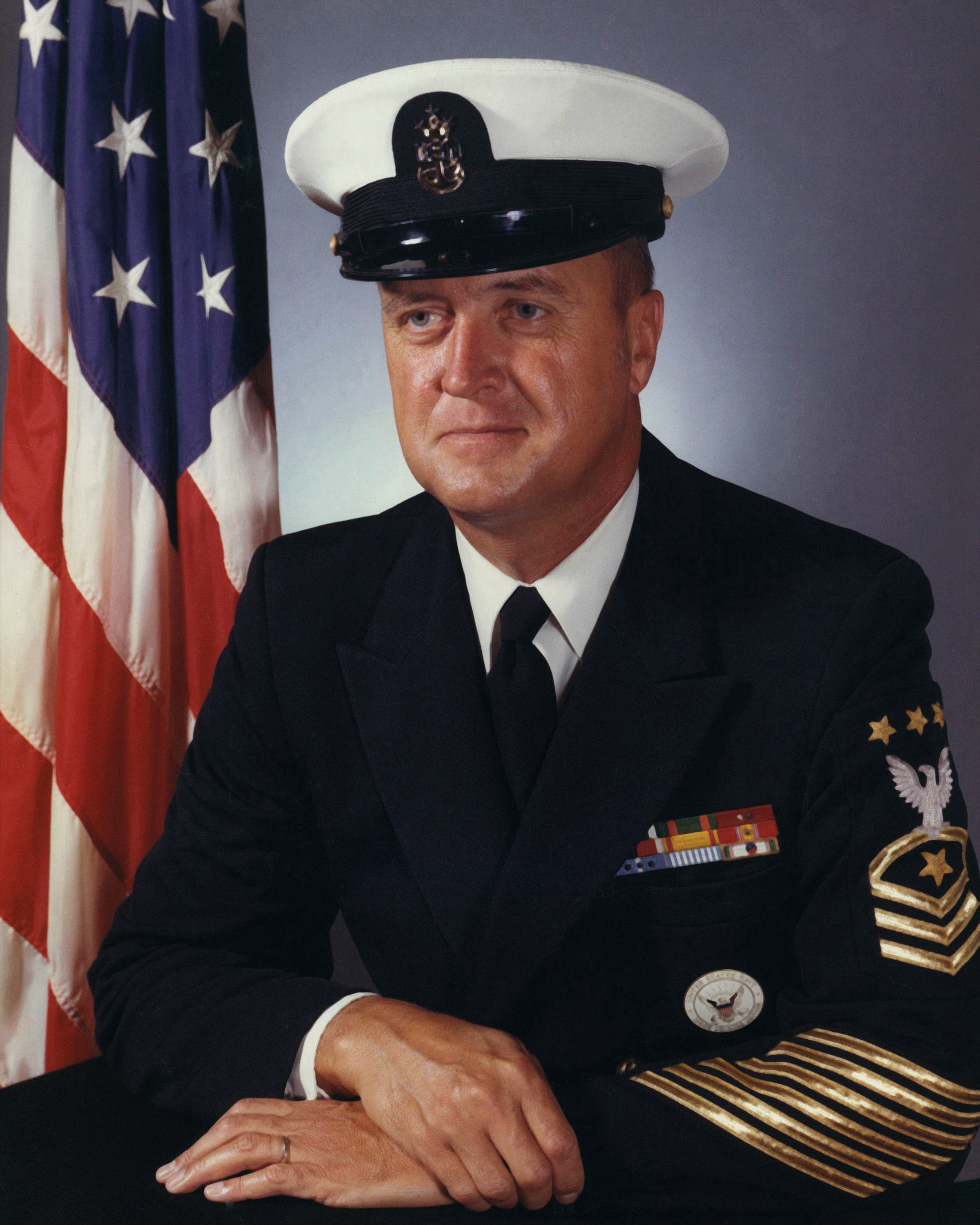
Robert Walker, Third Master Chief Petty Officer of the Navy

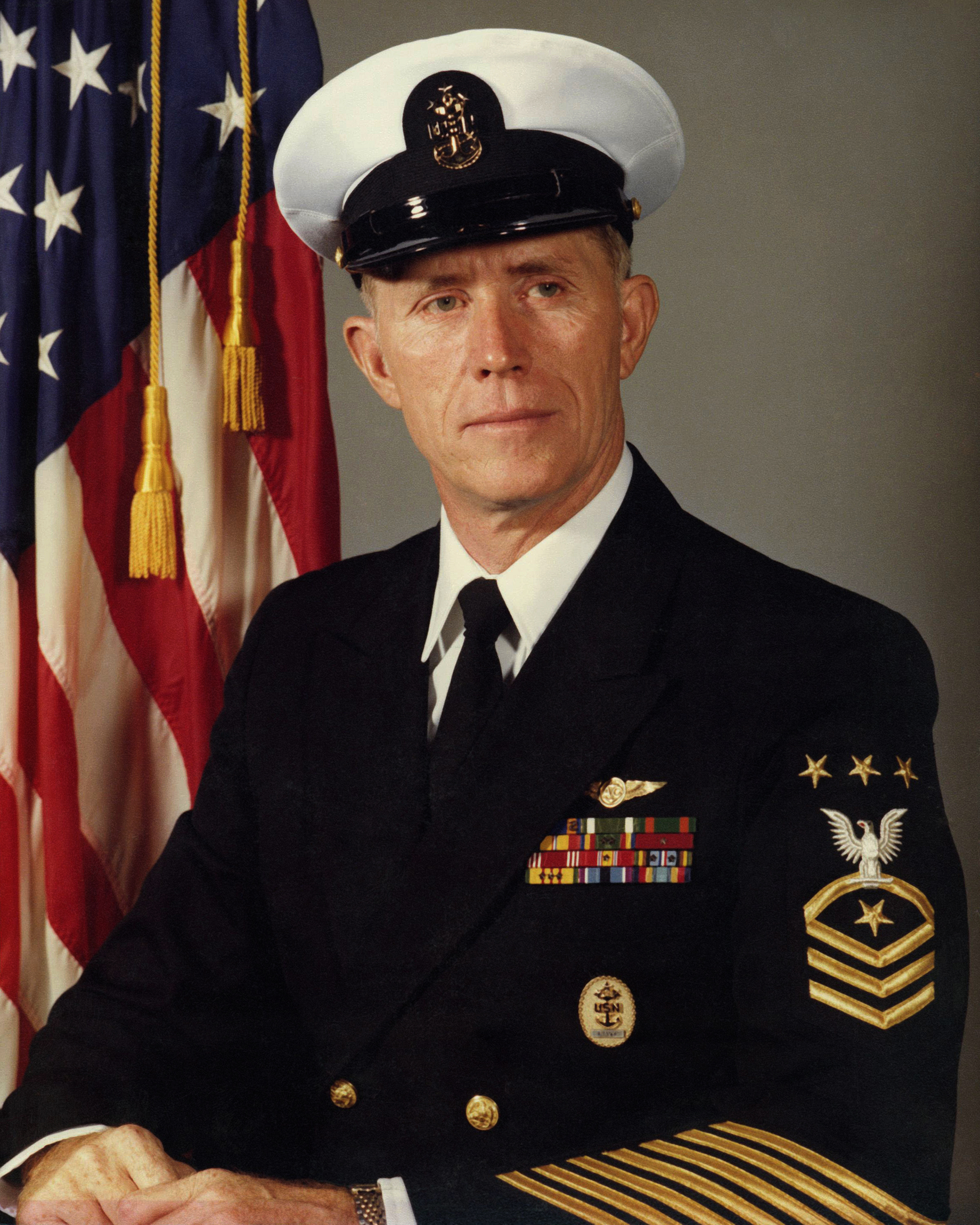
Billy C. Sanders, Fifth U.S. Master Chief Petty Officer of the Navy

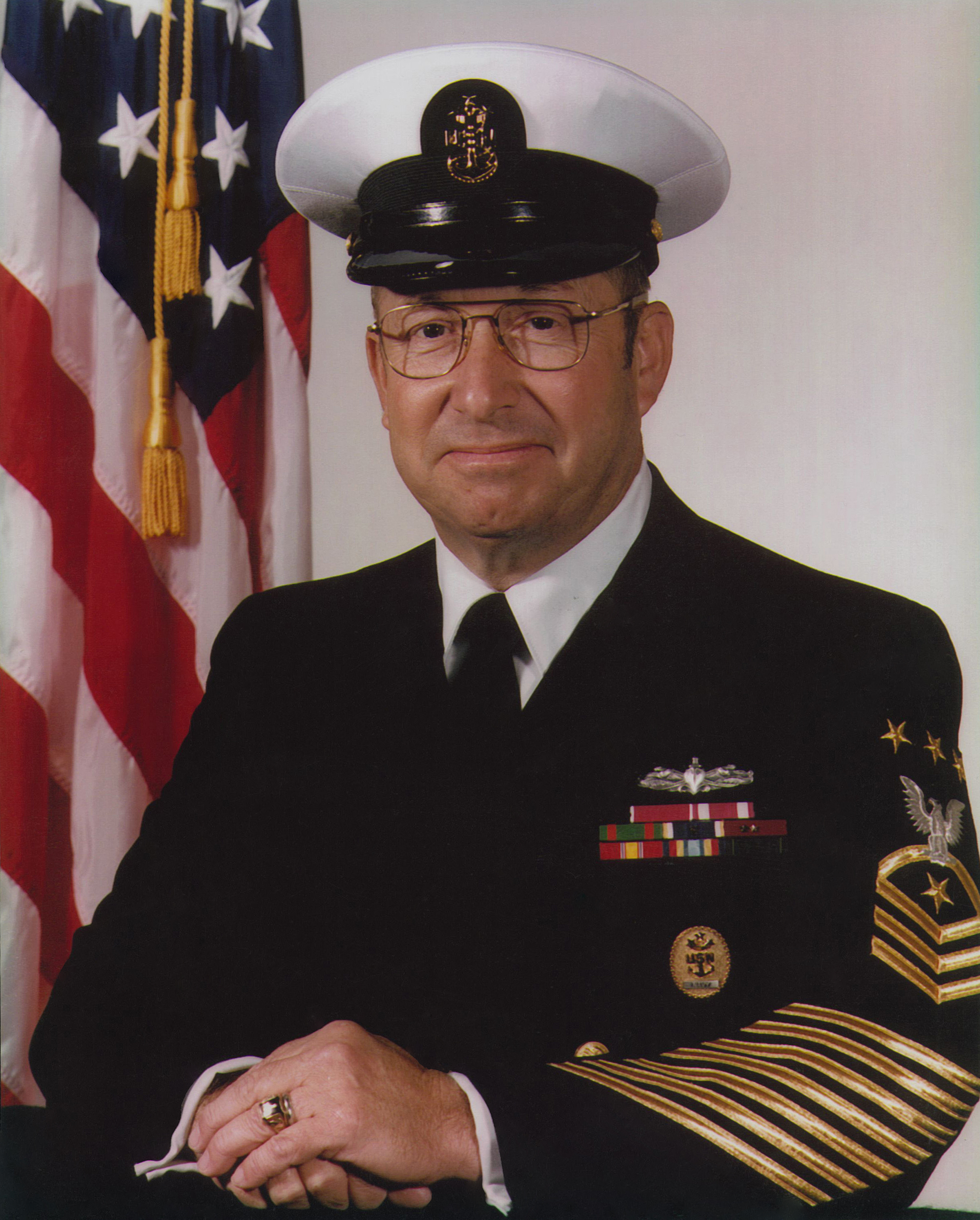
William H. Plackett, Sixth U.S. Master Chief Petty Officer of the Navy

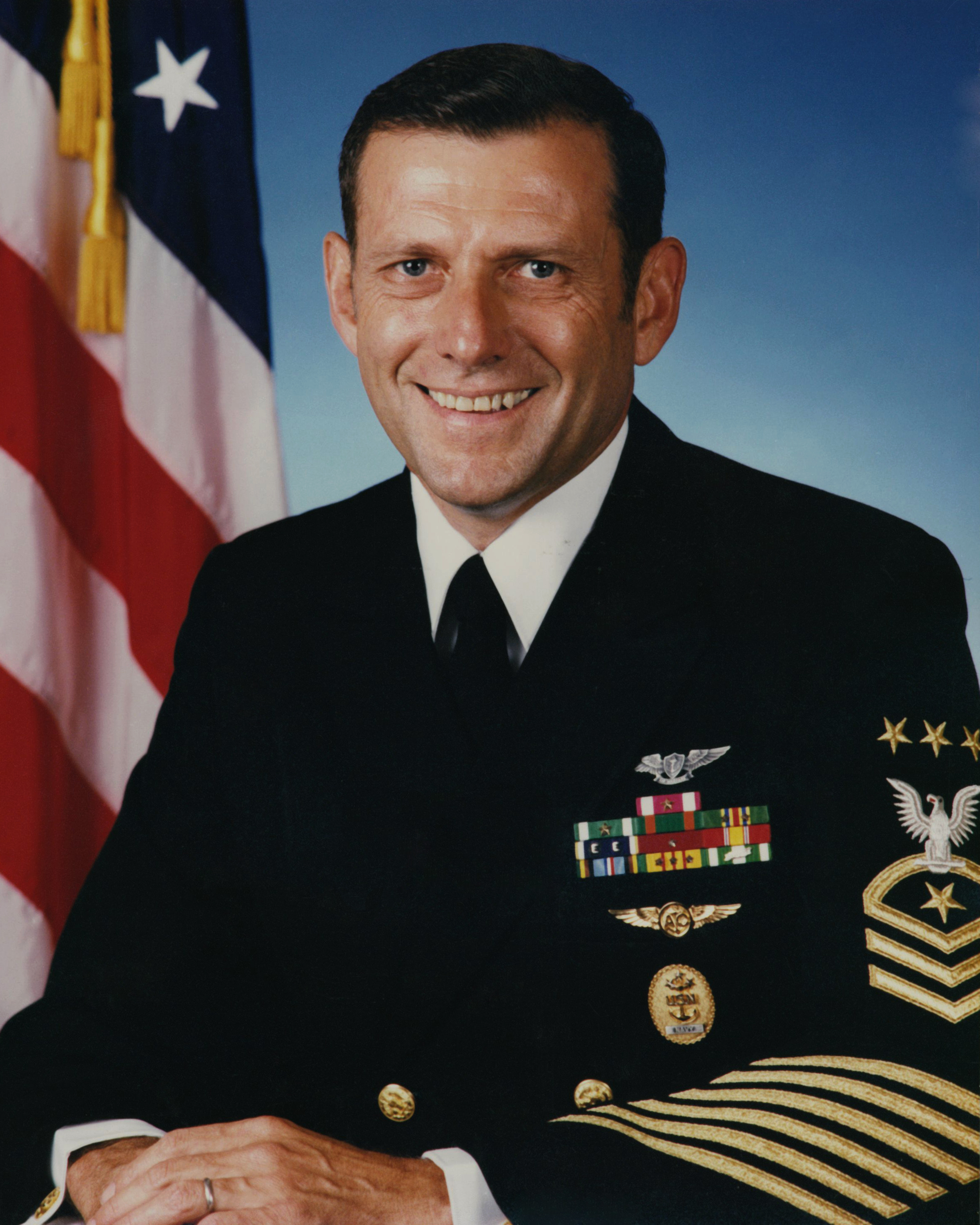
Duane R. Bushey, Seventh Master Chief Petty Officer of the Navy

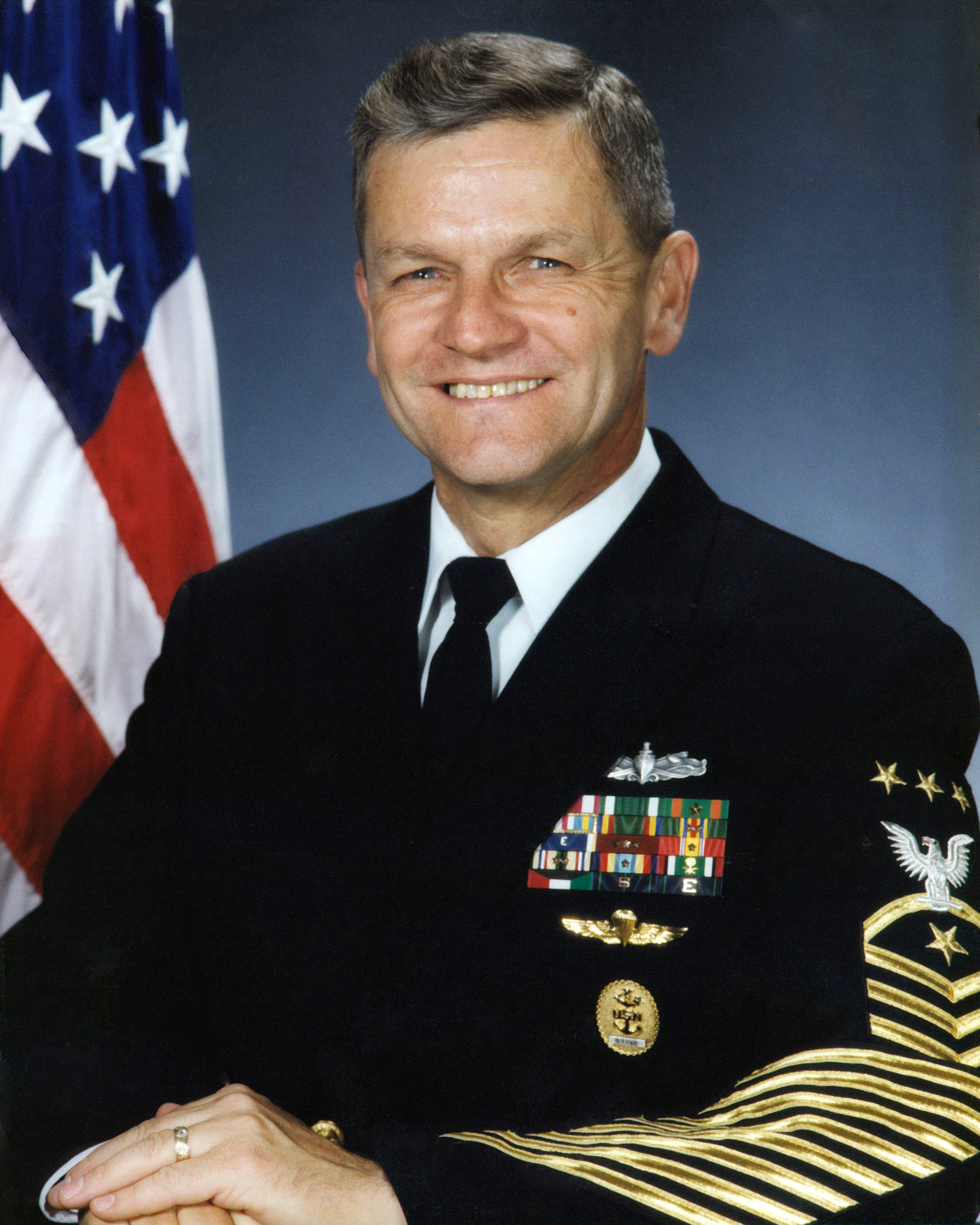
John Hagan, Eighth Master Chief Petty Officer of the Navy

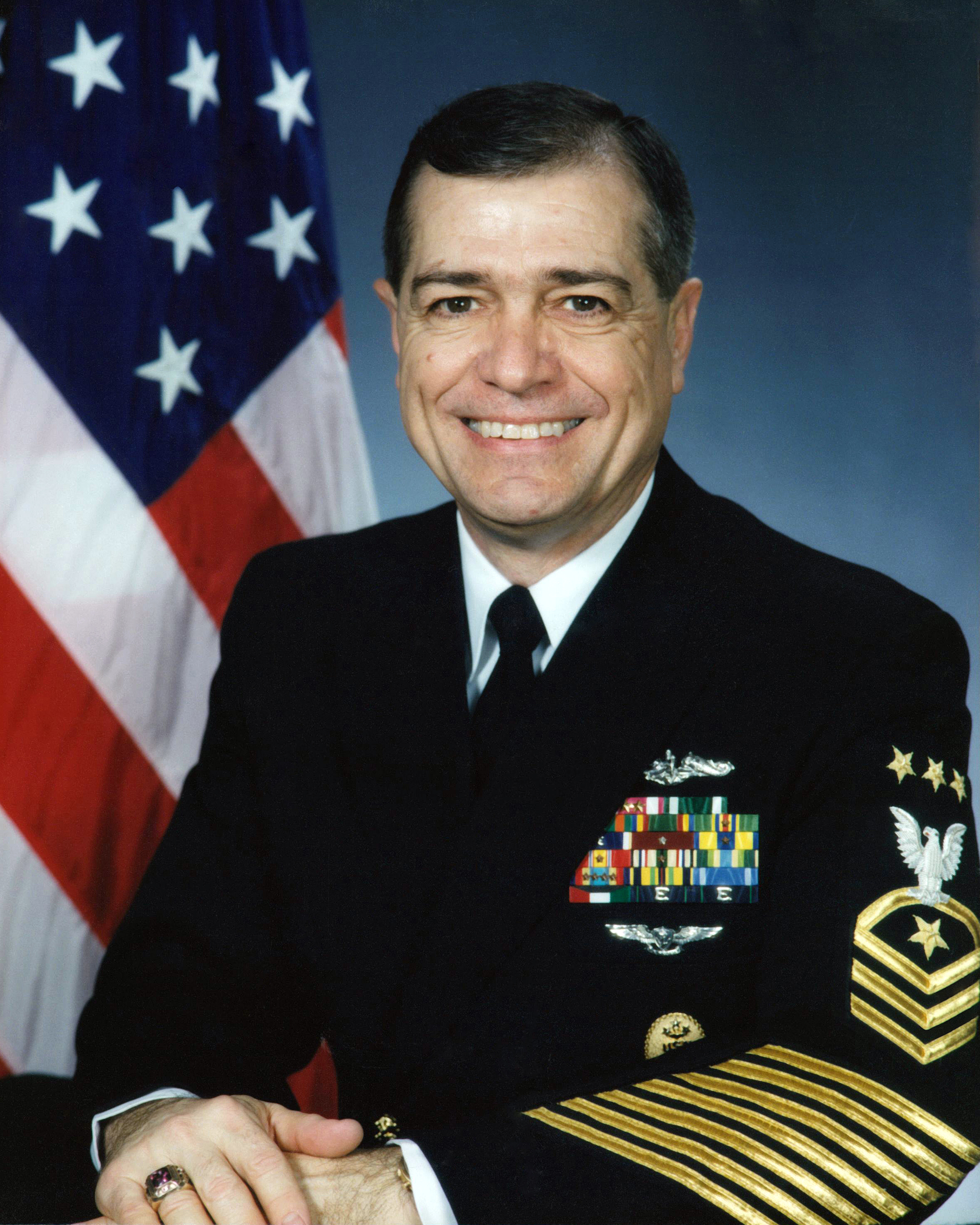
James L. Herdt, Ninth Master Chief Petty Officer of the Navy

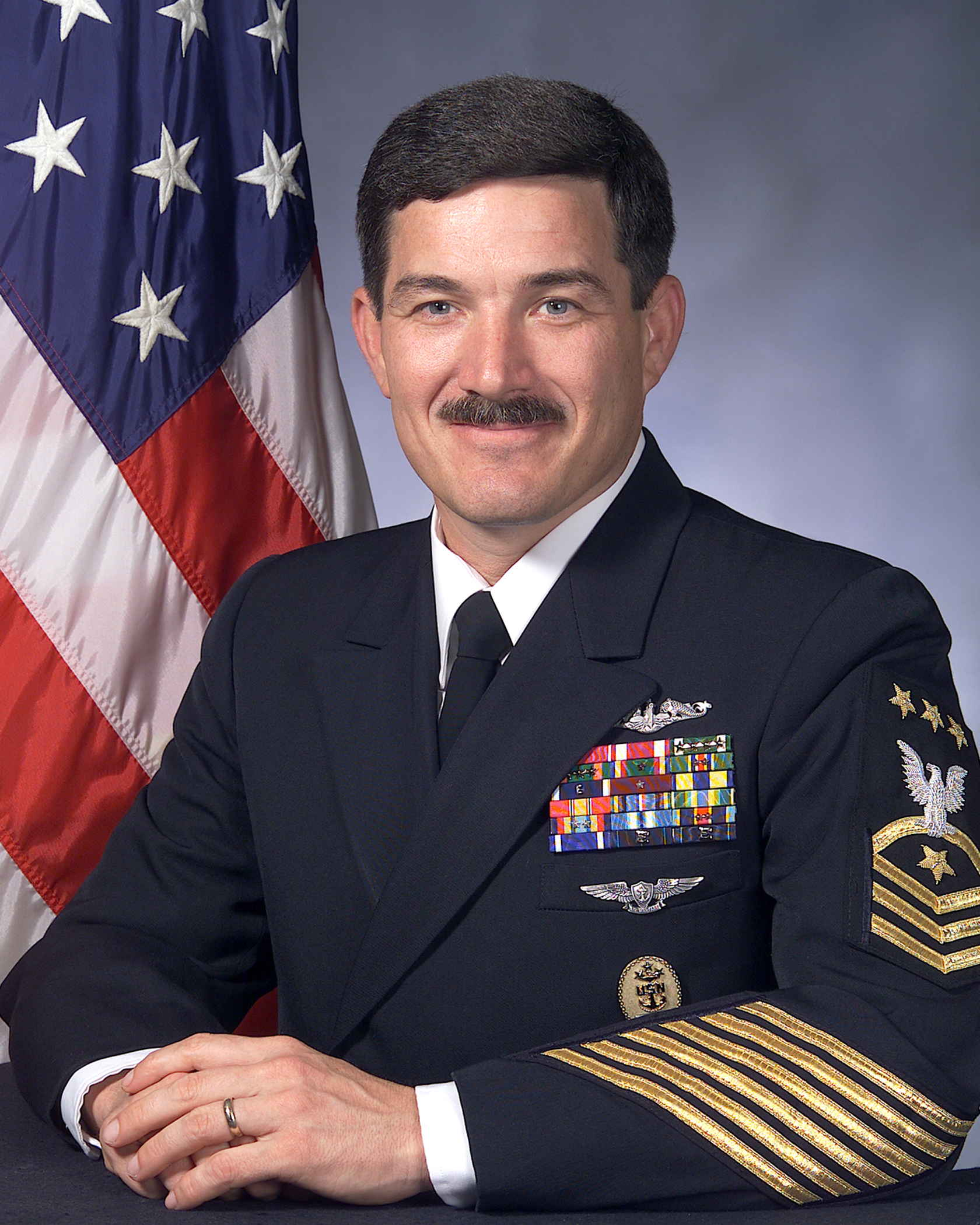
Terry D. Scott Tenth Master Chief Petty Officer of the Navy

== Publications ==
The organization's official full color magazine was originally launched in 1921 and called U.S. Navy Magazine "Fleet Reserve Bulletin". In October 1931 it was renamed Naval Affairs. In November 2006 the magazine's name and volume numbering system changed again, this time to FRAtoday. The publication is typically 48 pages of content and is published bimonthly.

== Organization Structure ==
=== National ===
The Fleet Reserve Association Headquarters is located in Alexandria, VA. It is the primary office for the National President and also houses the Membership Services and Communications.

== List of Past National Presidents ==
- William P. Green, 1922-1924
- Francis A. Knaus, 1924-1925
- Ed W. Wintering, 1925-1926
- Charles J. Batchelor, 1926-1927
- Robert A. Young, 1927-1928
- Otto Grunewald, 1928-1929
- Logan E. Ruggles, 1929-1930
- Philip G. Cronan, 1930-1931
- Cornelius E. Anderson, 1931-1932-1933
- Jesse Acuff, 1933-1934
- Abraham M. Rosenberg, 1934-1935
- John J. Bayer, 1935-1936
- Carl A. Viken, 1936-1937
- Jesse F. Cordes, 1937-1938
- Alexander Steele, 1938-1939
- Thomas C. Ryan, 1939-1940
- George C. Corbell, 1940-1941
- Frank T. Walker, 1941-1942
- John H. Burke, 1942-1943
- Clarence Boeckman, 1943-1944
- James H. Van Slycke, 1944-1945
- Robert W. Allen, 1945-1946
- Robert F. Bonomarte, 1946-1947
- Fredrick E. Grammer 1947-1948
- Christopher C. Sanders, 1948-1949
- Leo A. La Belle, 1949-1950
- James J. Ralph, 1950-1951
- James W. Mullins, 1951-1952
- Charles D. Hause, 1952-1953
- Edward E. Keeley, 1953-1954
- Michael F. Catania, 1954-1955
- William F. Hickey, 1955-1956
- Wilson H. Sandefer, 1956-1957
- Edgar H. Cook, 1957-1958
- Robert E. Doherty, 1958-1959
- Harold W. Elke, 1959-1960
- Charles A. Herget, 1960-1961
- Joseph Keehan, 1961-1962
- Robert A. Means, 1962-1963
- Edward C. Duffy, 1963-1964
- George C. Bernatz, 1964-1965
- Eddie King, 1965-1966
- Lawrence M. Bane 1966-1967
- Bernard P. O'hara 1969-1968
- Stanley S. Nahill 1968-1969
- Walter C. Rowell, 1969-1970
- Robert L. Bastian, 1970-1971
- Francis E. McCulley, 1971-1972
- William A. Holdforth, 1972-1973
- Marvin Silverman, 1973-1974
- Albert E. Wilson, 1974-1975
- Joseph D. Morin, 1974-1976
- Thomas A. Heaney, 1976-1977
- Royce J. Hatfield, 1977-1978
- Roderick D. Wiley, 1978-1979
- Marvin F. Harris, 1979-1980
- James W. Neal, 1980-1981
- Lawerence J. Cummings, 1981-1982
- Charles R. McIntyre, 1982-1983
- Daniel Spalding, 1983-1984
- Geworge E. Brown, 1984-1985
- Townsand I King, 1985-1986
- William G. McCarley 1986-1987
- Peter R. Ross Jr.,1987-1988
- John A. Putney, 1988-1989
- Jack A. Coover, 1989-1990
- William E. Combes, 1990-1991
- Wallace E Baker, 1991-1992
- Aloysius D. Caso, 1992-1993
- W.J. "Jim New, 1993-1994
- George P. Hyland, 1994-1995
- J.C. "Jim" Eblen, 1995-1996
- Robert E. Fudge, 1996-1997
- Robert G. Beese, 1997-1998
- Thomas l. Lisher, 1998-1999
- Marvin W. Johnson, 1999-2000
- Eugene Smith, 2000-2001
- Richard M. Smith, 2001-2002
- Ralph A. Schmidt, 2002-2003
- Joseph L. Maez, 2003-2004
- George R. Key, Virginia, 2004-2005
- Edgar M. Zerr, 2005-2006
- Jerry L. Sweeney, Virginia, 2006-2007
- Lawrence J. Bourdreaux, California, 2007-2008
- F. Donald Mucheck, South Carolina, 2008-2009
- Gary C. Blackburn, California, 2009-2010
- James W. Scarbro, Virginia, 2010-2011
- Jeffrey A. Gilmartin, Virginia, 2011-2012
- Mark A. Kilgore, Florida, 2012-2013
- Virgil P. Courneya Nevada, 2013-2014, 2015-2016
- John D. Ippert, Hawaii 2014-2015
- Donald E. Larson, Texas2016-2017
- William E.Starkey, New Jersey, 2017-2018
- Robert Washington, Maryland, 2018-2019
- Donna Jansky, Massachusetts, 2019-2020
- Michael Fulton, California, 2020-2021
- James Campbell, Virginia, 2021-2022
- James E. Robbins Jr., Floridia, 2022-2023
- John Handzuk, Florida, 2023-2024
- Maria A. Behm, Missouri, 2024-2025
- Richard Fetro, California, 2025-2026

== See also ==
- Armed Forces Day
- Memorial Day
- National Pearl Harbor Remembrance Day
- Memorial Poppy
- Veterans Day
