= Thomas Crow =

Thomas Crow may refer to:

- Thomas E. Crow (born 1948), American art historian and art critic
- Thomas S. Crow (1934–2008), Master Chief Petty Officer of the U.S. Navy
- Tom Crow (golfer) (1931–2020), Australian businessman and sportsman

== See also ==
- Thomas Crow Hundley, mayor of Hamburg, Arkansas
