= Thomas S. Crow =

American Navy officer

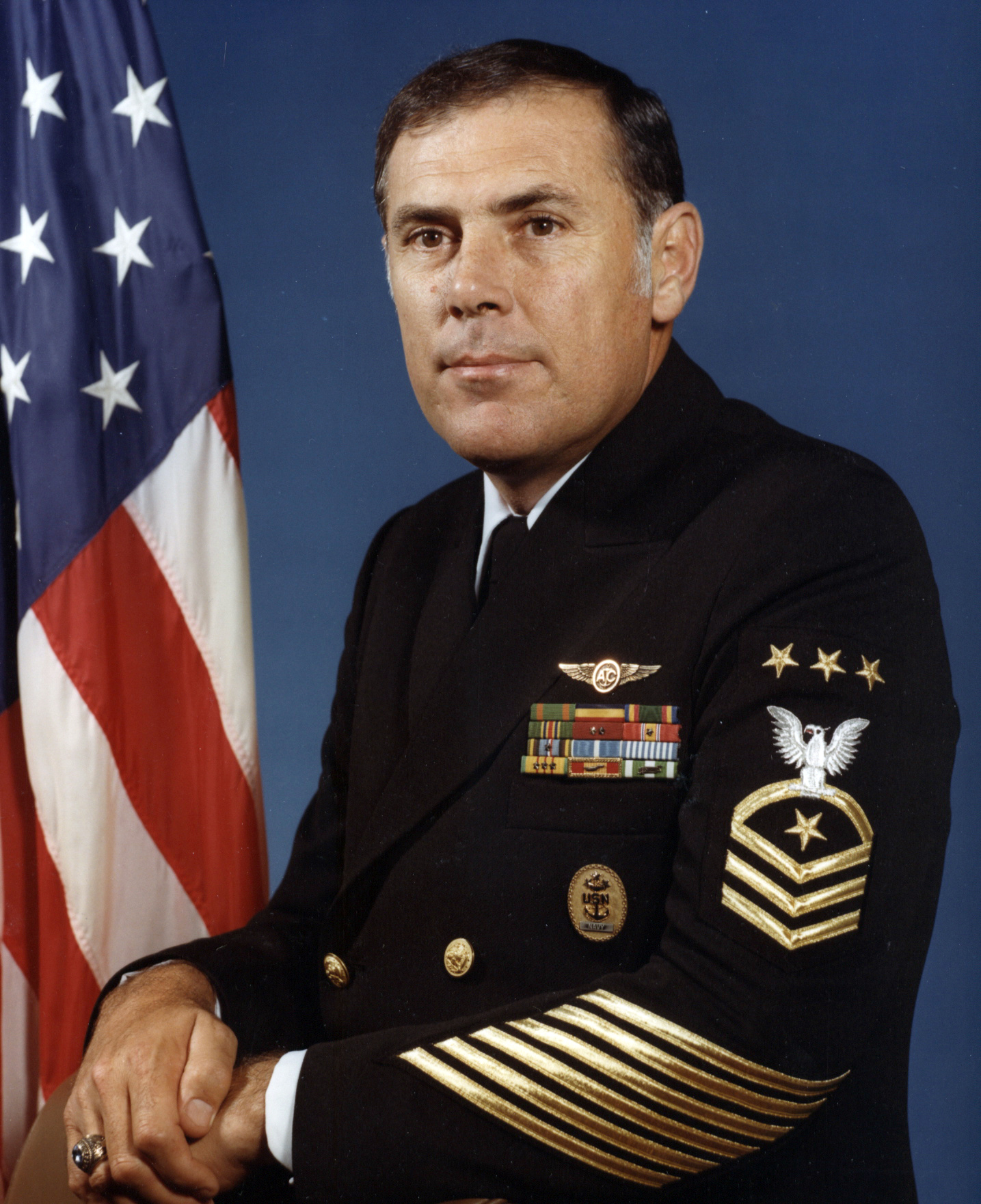
- 4th Master Chief Petty Officer of the Navy
- Born: March 16, 1934; McArthur, Ohio, U.S.
- Died: November 30, 2008 (aged 74) San Diego, California, U.S.
- Allegiance: United States of America
- Branch: United States Navy
- Service years: 1952–1982
- Rank: Master Chief Petty Officer of the Navy
- Commands: Master Chief Petty Officer of the Navy
- Awards: Navy Distinguished Service Medal; Meritorious Service Medal; Navy Achievement Medal
- Other work: Associate Director, National University

Thomas Sherman Crow (March 16, 1934 – November 30, 2008), fourth Master Chief Petty Officer of the Navy was born in 1934, in McArthur, Ohio, and graduated from McArthur High School (now Vinton County High School) in 1952. After battling cancer, he died at his home in San Diego, California on November 30, 2008. He was interred in Fort Rosecrans National Cemetery in San Diego, California.

== Career ==
After completion of recruit training, Crow attended AN "P" School and AM "A" School at NATTC, Memphis, Tennessee. His first tour was as an Airframe Structural Mechanic, Transport Air Crew member, VR-21, Barbers Point, Hawaii. He became a Search and Rescue Helo Crew member, NAS Chincoteague, Virginia. In 1958, he attended AM "B" School at NATTC, Memphis, Tennessee, and was advanced to AMH2.

Crow served as Aircrew A3D, VAH 9, Sanford, Florida, and deployed aboard USS Saratoga (CV-60). This tour was followed with a tour as an instructor at AM "B" school, Memphis, Tennessee. He reported to Fighter Squadron 121, NAS Miramar, California, in September, 1966. During this tour, he deployed aboard USS Coral Sea, and served in country in Da Nang and Chu Lai, Vietnam.

In August 1969, Crow reported to Naval Air Station North Island, California. During this tour he was advanced to Chief Petty Officer. His tour included a four-month TAD to VRC-50 in support of CIA, COD, aircraft maintenance. After his return to North Island, he was advanced to Senior Chief and was awarded the Navy Achievement Medal for performance as Maintenance CPO.

Crow received training at DoD Race Relations Institute at Patrick Air Force Base, Florida. With this training, he reported as Race Relations Education Specialist at Commander Naval Air Force Pacific Det ONE. In April 1974, he served as Program Manager, implementing Phase II of Equal Opportunity/Race Relations Program. He earned his associates of applied science degree in business administration from National University, San Diego.

Crow attended Navy Drug/Alcohol Counselor School, NAS Miramar and served in the Human Resource Management Office in February 1977. In December 1977 he was selected to serve as Master Chief of the Force, Senior Enlisted Advisor to Commander Naval Air Force Pacific. During this tour he earned his Bachelor of Business Administration at National University, San Diego, California.

In June 1979, Crow was selected by the Chief of Naval Operations to serve as the fourth Master Chief Petty Officer of the Navy. He was sworn into the position on September 28, 1979, and retired on October 1, 1982. He remained an active advocate of the Navy as a co-chairman of the Secretary of the Navy Retired Affairs from 1983 to 1986, honorary board chairman, U.S. Navy Memorial Foundation, Navy League of the United States, Fleet Reserve Association, a member on the board of advisors to San Diego Armed Services YMCA, and president of the United Armed Forces Association.

== Awards and decorations ==
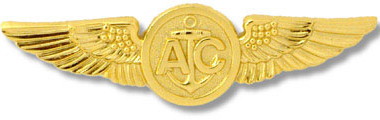
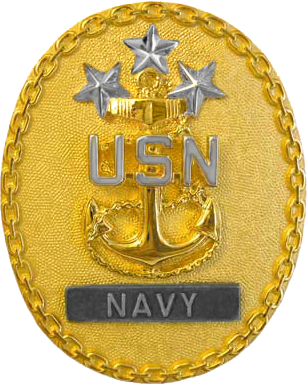
Naval Aircrew Warfare Specialist insignia
Master Chief Petty Officer of the Navy Identification Badge

Navy Distinguished Service Medal
Meritorious Service Medal
Navy and Marine Corps Achievement Medal
Navy Presidential Unit Citation
Navy Unit Commendation
Navy Meritorious Unit Commendation
Navy Good Conduct Medal with one silver and two bronze service stars
National Defense Service Medal with service star
Korean Service Medal
Armed Forces Expeditionary Medal with service star
Vietnam Service Medal with three service stars
Vietnam Gallantry Cross Unit Citation with palm and frame
United Nations Korea Medal
Vietnam Campaign Medal
Korean War Service Medal

- 7 gold Service Stripes.

Military offices
Preceded by Robert Walker	4th Master Chief Petty Officer of the Navy; 28 September 1979 – 1 October 1982	Succeeded by Billy C. Sanders
