= John Whittet =

American Navy officer (1925–1989)

John D. Whittet
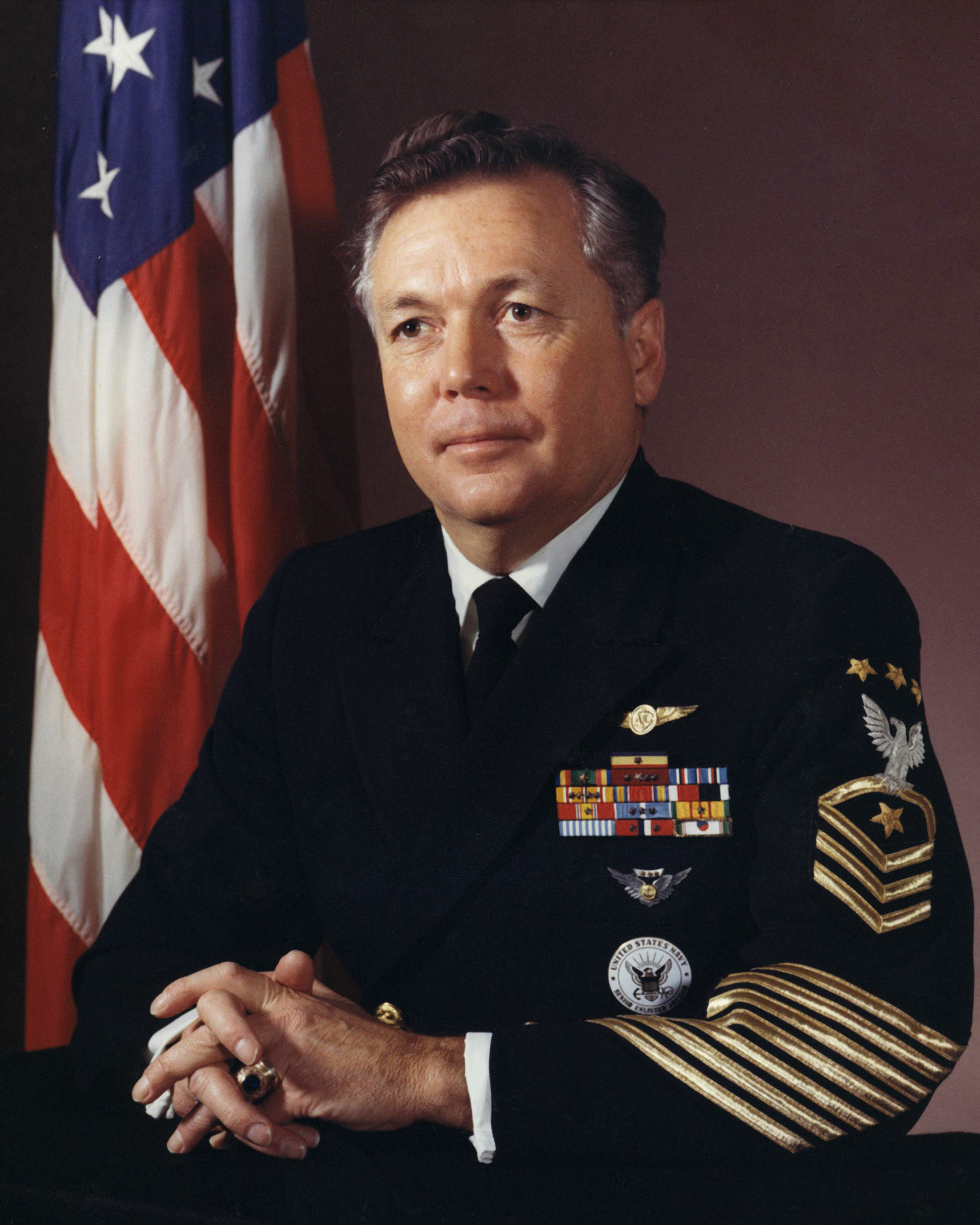
- 2nd Master Chief Petty Officer of the Navy
- Born: September 2, 1925
- Died: May 7, 1989 (aged 63); Colorado River
- Military career
- Allegiance: United States
- Branch: United States Navy
- Service years: 1943–1975
- Rank: Master Chief Petty Officer of the Navy
- Commands: Master Chief Petty Officer of the Navy
- Conflicts: World War II; Korean War; Vietnam War
- Awards: Navy Distinguished Service Medal

John Donaldson Whittet (September 4, 1925 – May 7, 1989) was a senior sailor in the United States Navy who served as the second Master Chief Petty Officer of the Navy.

== Early life ==
Whittet attended local grammar schools and Cranston High School.

== Naval career ==
Whittet enlisted in the United States Navy on March 24, 1943, and upon completion of recruit training, was assigned to the Aviation Machinist's Mate School in Great Lakes, Illinois. He followed the school with an assignment with Carrier Aircraft Service Units which operated from Guam. He won his combat aircrewman wings flying 31 missions from the carrier USS Lexington and USS Anzio, which won Presidential and Navy Unit Citations respectively. He ended his wartime service aboard Anzio following the ship's participation in the capture of Iwo Jima.

Following the war, Whittet completed flight engineer training for the B-24 Liberator aircraft and was assigned to Saudi Arabia. In 1950, he was transferred to Miramar Naval Air Station, San Diego. While serving as the leading petty officer of a shipboard detachment of F9F Panther aircraft, he was assigned temporary duty in the Western Pacific aboard the carrier USS Bon Homme Richard. While there, his air group participated in combat action in the Korean War and was awarded the Navy Unit Commendation.

Whittet followed his Korean War duty with assignments to several naval air station and aviation activities as a Jet Power Plant Instructor in the United States. In 1957 he was transferred to the Continental Air Defense Command at Colorado Springs, Colorado, where he worked as the flight crew plane captain for the Commander of Naval Forces at that command. In March 1960, Whittet joined Fighter Squadron One Nine Three and made three additional Western Pacific deployments aboard Bonhomme Richard.

Returning to stateside duty, Whittet spent two years with heavy attack squadrons at Whidbey Island Washington, and in 1964, was assigned to the Aerospace Recovery Facility at El Centro, California, where he performed duties as the Assistant Aircraft Maintenance Officer and Leading Chief Petty Officer. In 1967, Whittet was transferred to the NAS Argentia, Newfoundland, and served a three-year tour of duty as the Aircraft Maintenance Control Chief and the Senior Enlisted Advisor to the Commander, Fleet Air Argentia. Immediately prior to assuming the duties as the Master Chief Petty Officer of the Navy, he was assigned as the Master Chief of the United States Atlantic Fleet Air Force, in Norfolk, Virginia.

Whittet served as MCPON during a tumultuous time in the Navy's history. The Chief of Naval Operations, Admiral Elmo Zumwalt, was enacting radical changes, via his "Z-grams", to long-standing Navy policies and traditions. These changes, while supported by a majority of enlisted and officers, were resisted by some senior officers at the time. It fell to MCPON Whittet to solicit input and feedback from the enlisted force to the CNO and Chief of Naval Personnel (CNP) regarding these changes, such as the removal of the traditional jumper uniform "crackerjacks" from the junior enlisted seabag, and replacement with the jacket and tie uniform worn by commissioned officers and Chief Petty Officers. Grooming standards were relaxed; sailors were permitted to grow beards, and the maximum hair length was increased. Whittet's tenure saw many modernizations to policy that are still in place today, such as the first posting of women to ships, the institution of random urinalysis for drug testing, revisions to the performance evaluation and enlisted advancement procedures and institution of the Chief Petty Officer selection board, and race sensitivity training to decrease racial tension within the enlisted ranks.

After his tour as Master Chief Petty Officer of the Navy (MCPON), Whittet accepted the position with the Human Resources Management Program at Naval Amphibious School, Coronado, California. A year after his MCPON tour was over, and after having served over 30 years on active duty, Whittet would become one of the first members of the new Master at Arms rating. After retirement from active duty in 1976, Master Chief Whittet went on to a position as director of morale, welfare, and recreation at Naval Amphibious Base Coronado.

== Death ==
On May 7, 1989, Whittet was diving in the Colorado River. He became caught in the rocks and drowned. He was interred in Fort Rosecrans National Cemetery in San Diego, California.

== Awards and decorations ==
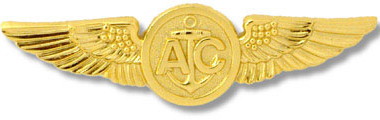
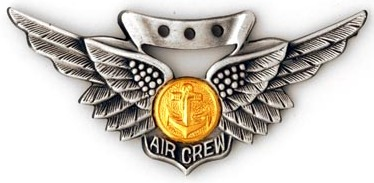
Naval Aircrew Warfare Specialist insignia
Combat Aircrew Badge

Navy Distinguished Service Medal
Navy Presidential Unit Citation with service star
Navy Unit Commendation with service star
Navy Good Conduct Medal with one silver and two bronze service stars
American Campaign Medal
Asiatic-Pacific Campaign Medal with four service stars
World War II Victory Medal
Navy Occupation Service Medal
National Defense Service Medal with service star
Korean Service Medal with three service stars
Vietnam Service Medal with service star
Korean Presidential Unit Citation
Philippine Liberation Medal with two service stars
United Nations Korea Medal
Korean War Service Medal

- 8 gold Service Stripes.
- Senior Enlisted Advisor Badge.

Military offices
Preceded by Delbert Black	2nd Master Chief Petty Officer of the Navy; 1 April 1971 – 25 September 1975	Succeeded by Robert Walker
