= Duane R. Bushey =

Master Chief Petty Officer of the Navy

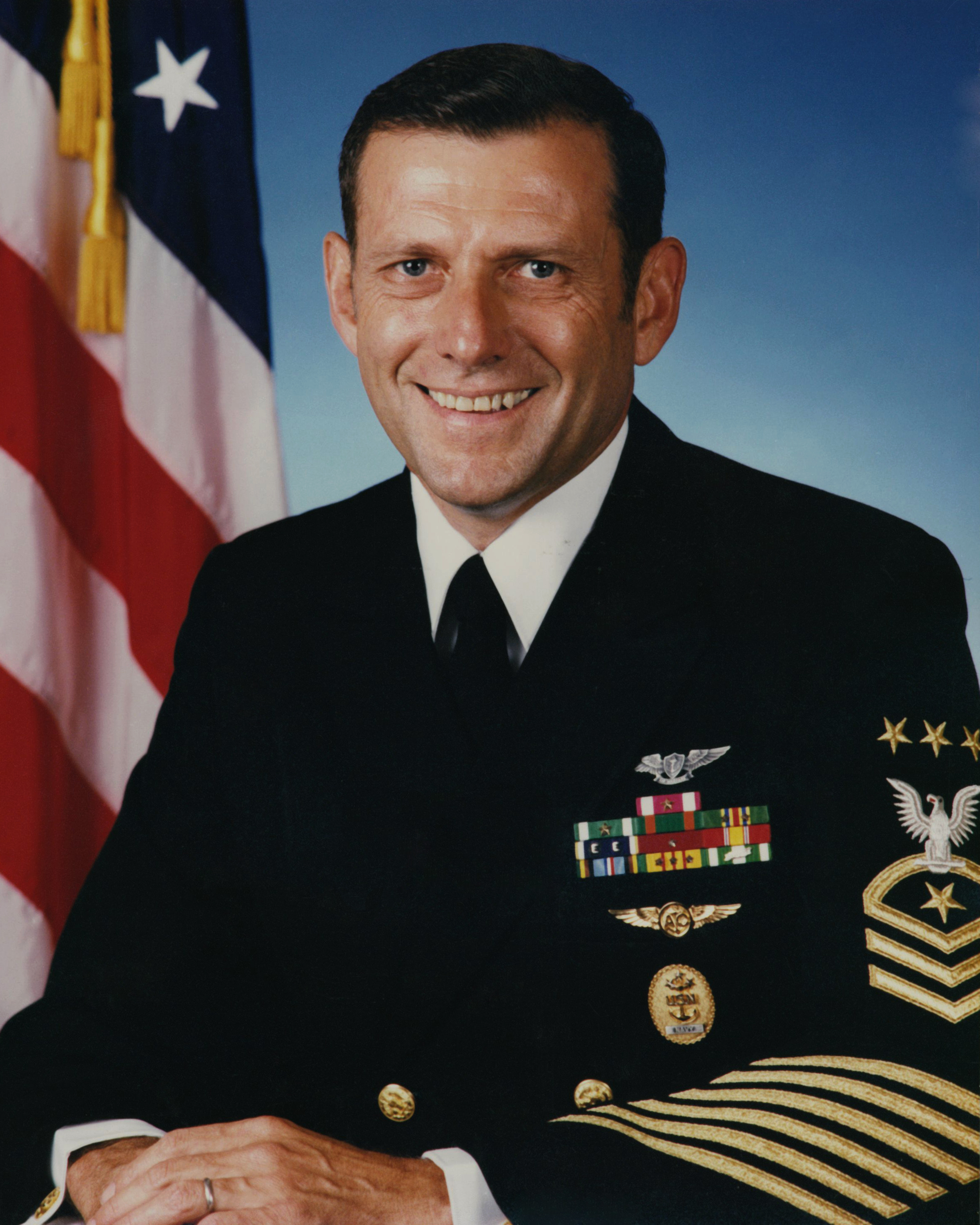
- 7th Master Chief Petty Officer of the Navy
- Born: May 3, 1944 (age 82); Lebanon, New Hampshire, U.S.
- Military career
- Allegiance: United States
- Branch: United States Navy
- Service years: 1962–1992
- Rank: Master Chief Petty Officer of the Navy
- Commands: Master Chief Petty Officer of the Navy
- Conflicts: Vietnam War
- Awards: Navy Distinguished Service Medal; Meritorious Service Medal (2); Navy Commendation Medal (2); Navy Achievement Medal

Duane R. Bushey (born May 3, 1944) is a retired senior sailor of the United States Navy who served as the seventh Master Chief Petty Officer of the Navy.

== Early life ==
Following graduation from Wicomico High School in Salisbury, Maryland, Bushey enlisted in the United States Navy in June 1962.

== Naval career ==
Bushey received recruit training at the Naval Training Center in Great Lakes, Illinois, and completed Aviation Electrician "A" school in Jacksonville, Florida. He first saw duty at the naval Air Test Facility at the Naval Air Station in Patuxent River, Maryland, followed by further technical training in an advanced electronics "B" school. He then served on board the aircraft carrier USS Kearsarge (CVS-33), with two follow-on tours as a flight instructor for fleet replacement navigators with Heavy Attack Squadron 123 at the Naval Air Station, Whidbey Island, Washington and Tactical Electronic Warfare Squadron 130 at the Naval Air Station in Alameda, California, where he served as Celestial and Radar Navigation Instructor.

Bushey then served as the Assistant Aircrew Division Officer for the Aircraft Ferry Squadron Thirty One in Norfolk, Virginia. While serving with VRF-31, he qualified as an overwater navigator in several aircraft, as flight engineer for P-3 Orion aircraft and bombardier/navigator for A-6 Intruder aircraft.

Bushey was selected to attend the United States Army Sergeants Major Academy in Fort Bliss, Texas in January 1980 and while there received the General Ralph E. Hanes Jr. Award for outstanding research. Following graduation in July 1980 he returned to VRF-31 as command master chief. Bushey served as the first Command Master Chief for USS Theodore Roosevelt CVN-71, arriving while the ship was still under construction, and is a "TR Plankowner". On September 9, 1988, Bushey became the seventh Master Chief Petty Officer of the Navy. He has accumulated more than 6,000 flying hours and made more than 400 carrier landings.

== Awards and decorations ==
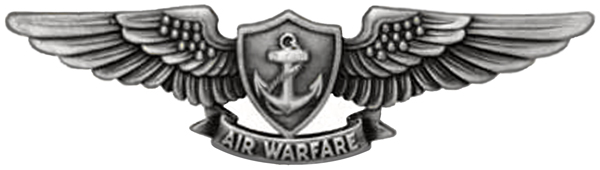
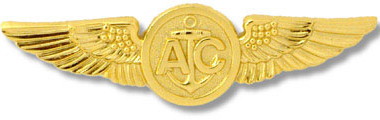
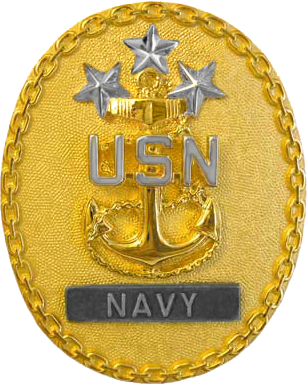
Enlisted Aviation Warfare Specialist insignia
Naval Aircrew Warfare Specialist insignia
Master Chief Petty Officer of the Navy Identification Badge

Navy Distinguished Service Medal
Meritorious Service Medal with award star
Navy and Marine Corps Commendation Medal with award star
Navy and Marine Corps Achievement Medal
Navy Meritorious Unit Commendation with two service stars
Navy "E" Ribbon with two Battle E devices
Navy Good Conduct Medal with one silver and one bronze service stars
National Defense Service Medal with service star
Armed Forces Expeditionary Medal
Vietnam Service Medal with three service stars
Vietnam Campaign Medal

- 7 gold Service Stripes.

Military offices
Preceded by William H. Plackett	7th Master Chief Petty Officer of the Navy; September 9, 1988 – August 28, 1992	Succeeded by John Hagan
