= William H. Plackett =

United States navy officer (1937–2016)

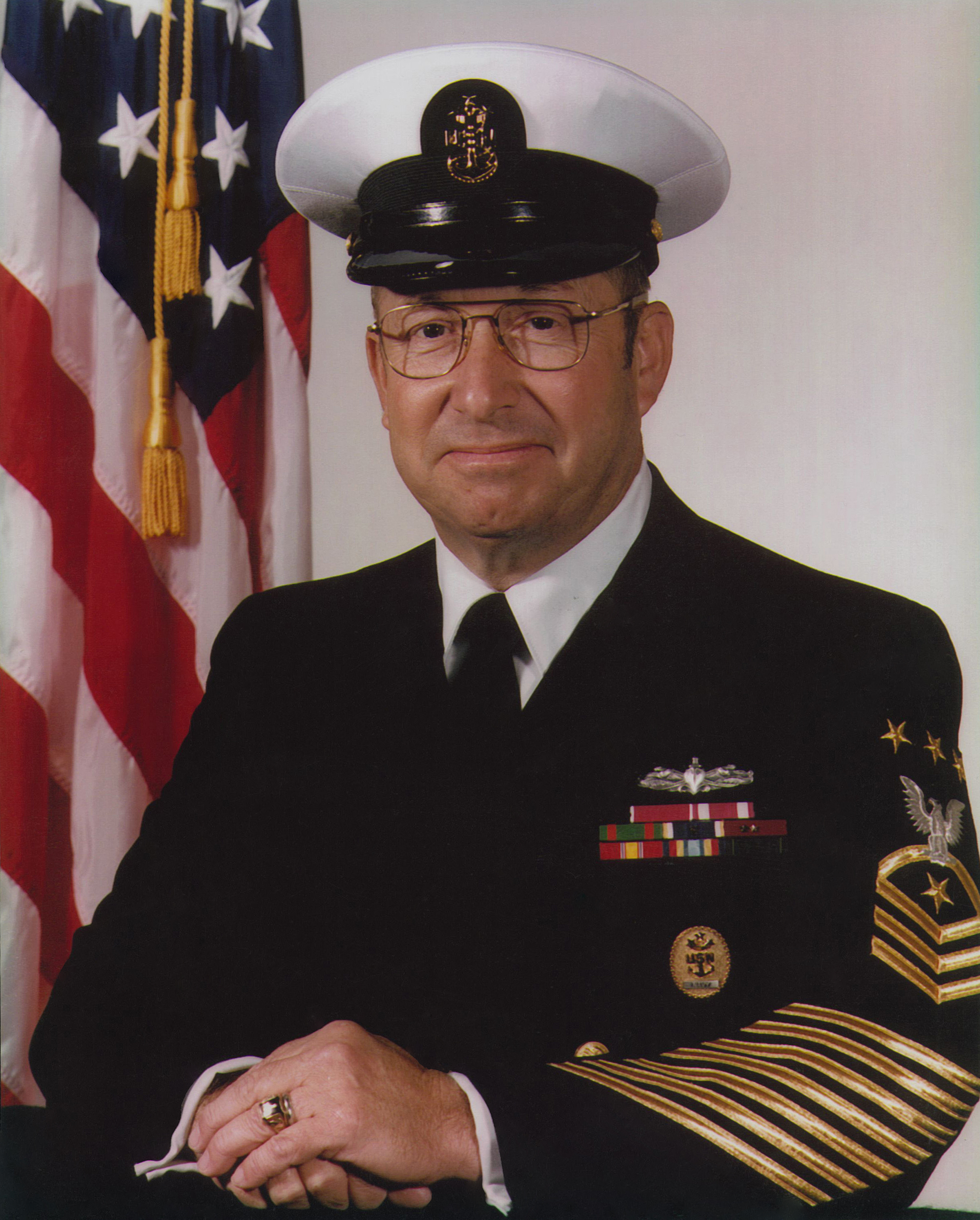
- 6th Master Chief Petty Officer of the Navy
- Born: April 4, 1937; Paxton, Illinois, U.S.
- Died: March 4, 2016 (aged 78); Virginia Beach, Virginia, U.S.
- Military career
- Allegiance: United States
- Branch: United States Navy
- Service years: 1956–1988
- Rank: Master Chief Petty Officer of the Navy
- Commands: Master Chief Petty Officer of the Navy
- Awards: Navy Distinguished Service Medal; Legion of Merit; Meritorious Service Medal; Navy and Marine Corps Achievement Medal

William Howard Plackett (April 4, 1937 – March 4, 2016) was a senior sailor in the United States Navy who served as the sixth Master Chief Petty Officer of the Navy.

== Naval career ==
Plackett's first duty station was with the Naval Control of Shipping Office on Bahrain in the Persian Gulf and earned promotion to petty officer third class. He transferred to the staff of Commander, Amphibious Force, United States Atlantic Fleet, embarked in USS Mount McKinley (LCC-7) in August 1959. Following that tour, he went back to the schoolhouse for Radioman "B" school and was assigned to Representative, Commander East Force/Naval Control of Shipping Office. He was there during the Six-Day War. In September 1967, just 11 years after joining the navy, he was selected as a chief petty officer. Upon completion of a tour aboard USS Forrestal (CV-59), which included an extended ten-month deployment in the Mediterranean Sea, he served as an instructor at Radioman "B" school in United States Naval Training Center Bainbridge.

Plackett was selected for the associate degree Completion Program in April 1971 and was advanced to senior chief petty officer while attending classes at Pensacola Junior College. He graduated with honors in December 1972 and was awarded an academic scholarship at the University of West Florida. He graduated magna cum laude with a Bachelor of Science degree in vocational education one year later.

Following a second tour on the Forrestal and his selection as master chief petty officer, he assumed duties as Director of Communications School, Fleet Training Center, Norfolk, Virginia. In 1979, he was named command master chief for Commander, Training Command, United States Atlantic Fleet Headquarters and subsequently was selected as the first Force Master Chief of the Atlantic Fleet Training Command in July 1981. In July 1982, Plackett was selected as Fleet Master Chief, Commander in Chief United States Atlantic Fleet where he served until his selection in July 1985 as the sixth Master Chief Petty Officer of the Navy.

== Awards and decorations ==
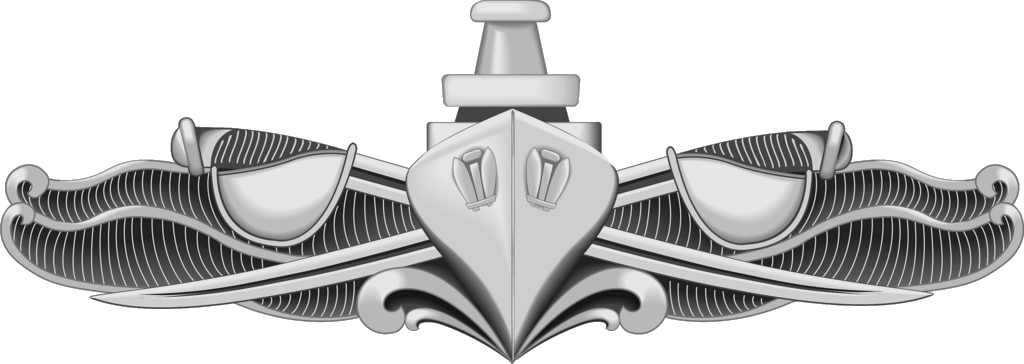
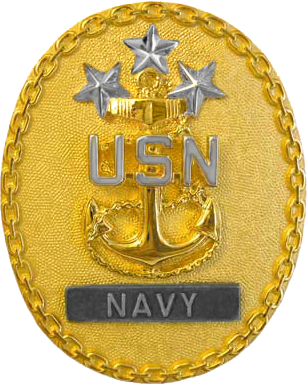
Enlisted Surface Warfare Specialist insignia
Master Chief Petty Officer of the Navy Badge

Navy Distinguished Service Medal
Legion of Merit
Meritorious Service Medal
Navy and Marine Corps Achievement Medal
Navy "E" Ribbon
Navy Good Conduct Medal with one silver and two bronze service stars
National Defense Service Medal
Navy Sea Service Deployment Ribbon
Navy Pistol Marksmanship Ribbon

- 8 gold service stripes.

Military offices
Preceded by Billy C. Sanders	6th Master Chief Petty Officer of the Navy; 4 October 1985 – 9 September 1988	Succeeded by Duane R. Bushey
