= James L. Herdt =

US Navy officer (born 1947)

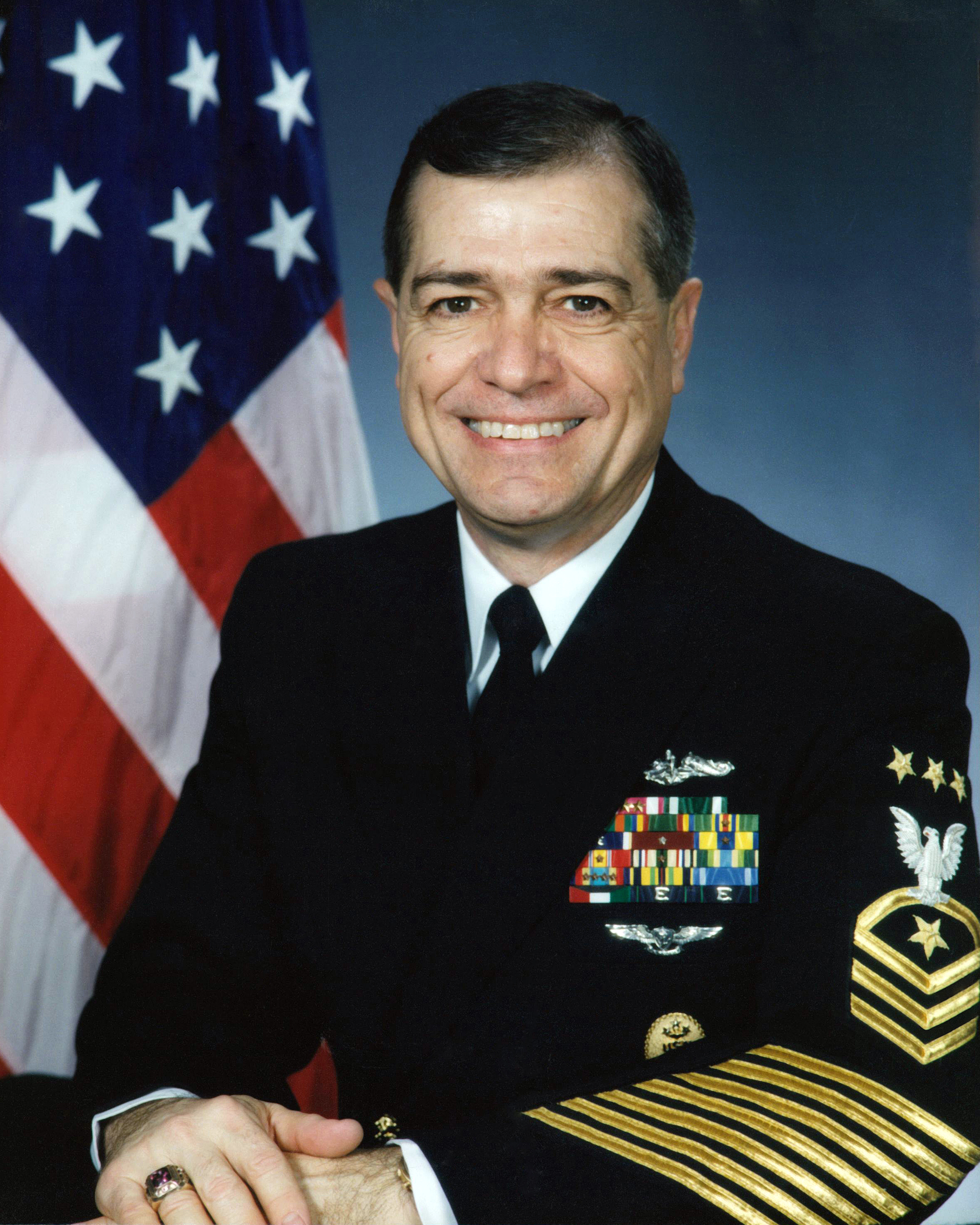
- Born: February 12, 1947 (age 79); Casper, Wyoming, U.S.
- Military career
- Allegiance: United States
- Branch: United States Navy
- Service years: 1966–2002
- Rank: Master Chief Petty Officer of the Navy
- Commands: Master Chief Petty Officer of the Navy
- Conflicts: Gulf War
- Awards: Navy Distinguished Service Medal; Meritorious Service Medal; Navy and Marine Corps Commendation Medal; Navy and Marine Corps Achievement Medal (2)

James Lee Herdt (born February 12, 1947) is a retired senior Sailor in the United States Navy who served as the ninth Master Chief Petty Officer of the Navy from March 27, 1998, to April 22, 2002.

== Early life and education ==
A native of Casper, Wyoming, Herdt enlisted in the United States Navy in 1966. After attending Machinist's Mate "A" School in Great Lakes, Illinois, he served sea tours aboard the USS Independence (CV-62) and USS Will Rogers (SSBN-659) and shore tours at Nuclear Power Training Unit, Windsor, Connecticut, and Radiological Repair Facility in New London, Connecticut.

== Naval career ==
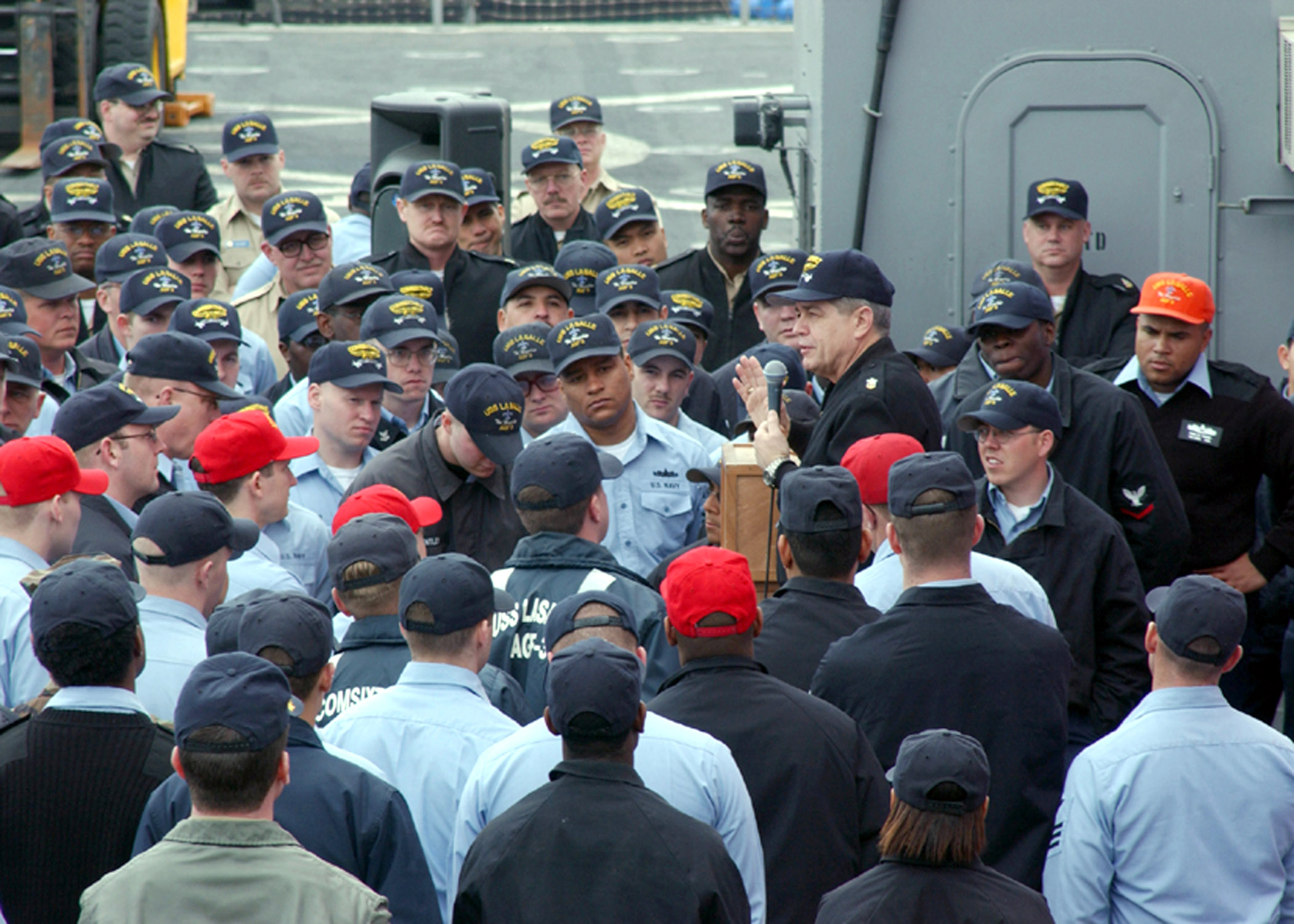
Herdt talking with sailors in March 2002.

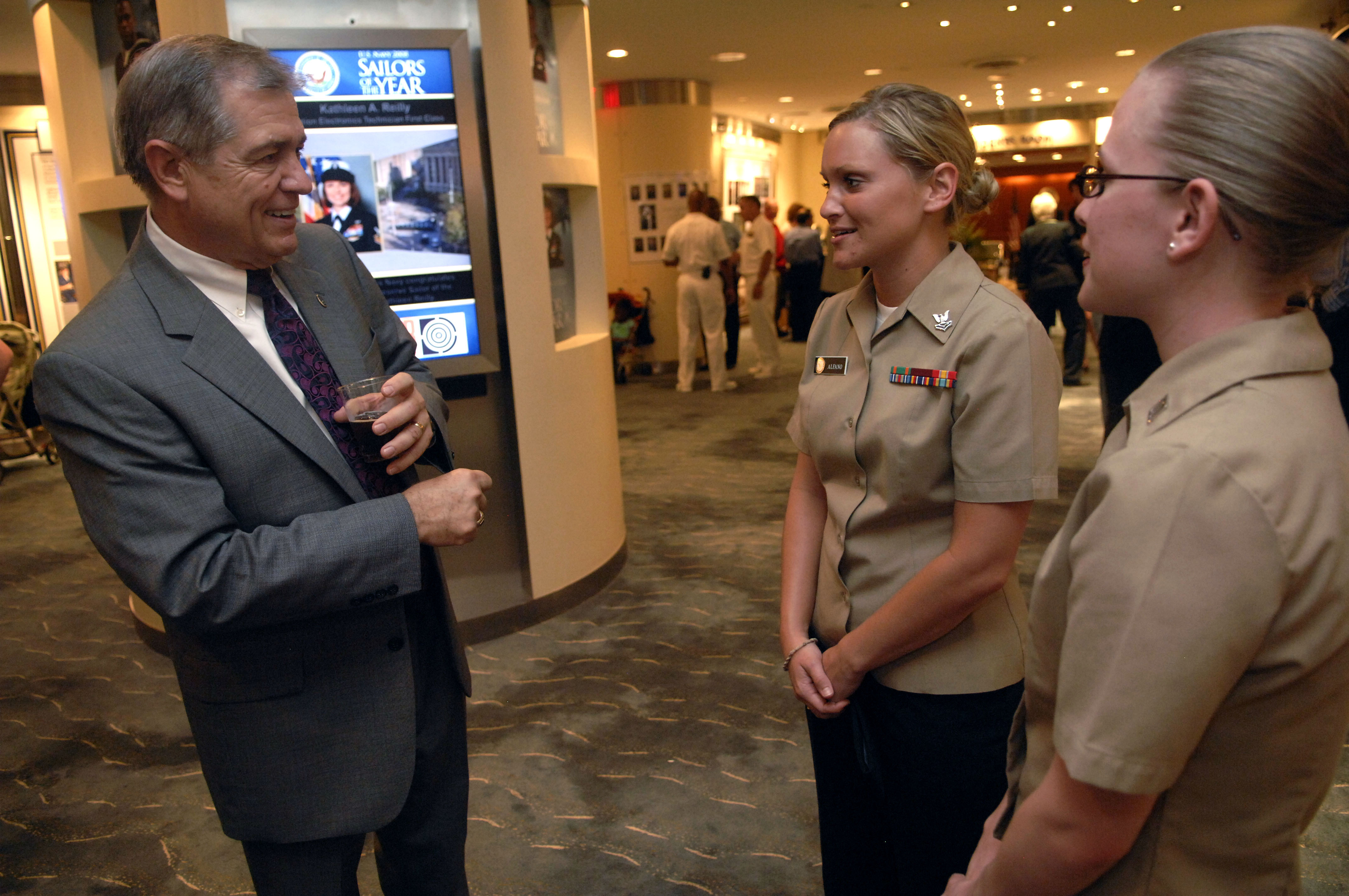
Herdt talking with sailors in June 2009.

After leaving active duty in 1974, Herdt enlisted in the United States Navy Reserve, serving in various Selected Naval Reserve units while attending Kansas State University. Returning to active duty in 1976, he served as a Naval Reserve Recruiter in Milwaukee, Wisconsin, and in 1978 rejoined the regular navy.

Herdt served aboard USS Texas (CGN-39), USS Cincinnati (SSN-693), and on the staff of the Nuclear Power School in Orlando, Florida, prior to his tour as chief of the boat aboard USS Skipjack (SSN-585). He has served as Command Master Chief at Nuclear Field "A" School, Orlando, Florida, on board USS Theodore Roosevelt (CVN-71), and at Naval Training Center, Great Lakes, Illinois. In 1996, he was selected to serve and as the Chief of Naval Education and Training Force Master Chief. He was sworn in as the ninth Master Chief Petty Officer of the Navy on March 27, 1998.

On March 10, 2000, the first MCPON, Delbert Black, was buried at Arlington National Cemetery. Herdt, who was just beginning his enlistment during Black's tour as MCPON, delivered the eulogy.

== Awards and decorations ==
Herdt is a graduate of the United States Navy Senior Enlisted Academy and United States Army Sergeants Major Academy. He has earned a Master of Business Administration degree with a concentration in human resources management from Florida Institute of Technology in 1992. He is "triple qualified" (authorized to wear the Enlisted Aviation Warfare Specialist, Enlisted Surface Warfare Specialist, and Enlisted Submarine Warfare Specialist breast insignias). Herdt is also certified as a Master Training Specialist.

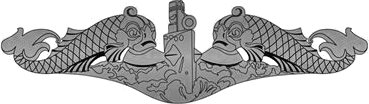
- Enlisted Submarine Warfare Specialist insignia
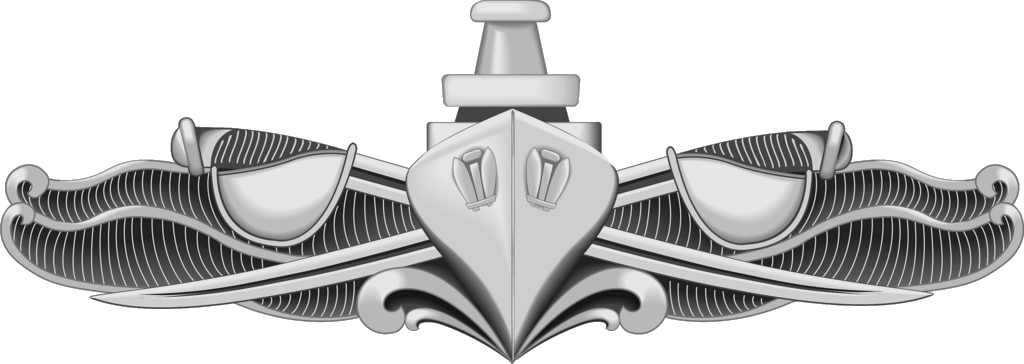
- Enlisted Surface Warfare Specialist insignia
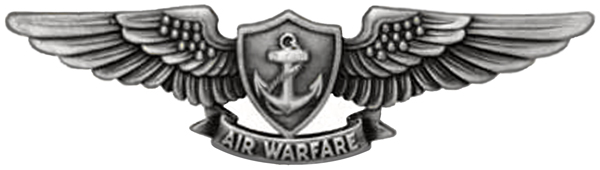
- Enlisted Aviation Warfare Specialist insignia
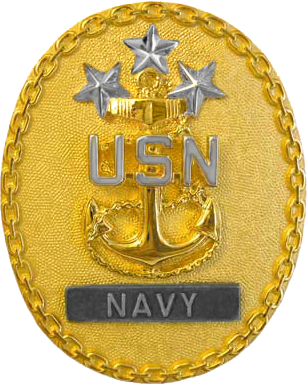
- Master Chief Petty Officer of the Navy Identification Badge

Navy Distinguished Service Medal
Meritorious Service Medal with two gold award stars
Navy and Marine Corps Commendation Medal
Navy and Marine Corps Achievement Medal with award star
Navy Unit Commendation
Navy Meritorious Unit Commendation with one bronze service star
Navy "E" Ribbon
Navy Good Conduct Medal with one silver and two bronze service stars
Navy Expeditionary Medal with service star
National Defense Service Medal with service star
Southwest Asia Service Medal with service star
Armed Forces Service Medal
Navy Sea Service Deployment Ribbon with four service stars
Navy Recruiting Service Ribbon
NATO Medal for the former Yugoslavia
Kuwait Liberation Medal from Kuwait
Navy Expert Rifleman Medal
Navy Expert Pistol Shot Medal

- Eight gold service stripes.

Military offices
Preceded by John Hagan	9th Master Chief Petty Officer of the Navy; March 27, 1998 – April 22, 2002	Succeeded by Terry D. Scott
