= Billy C. Sanders =

Master Chief Petty Officer of the United States Navy (1936–2026)

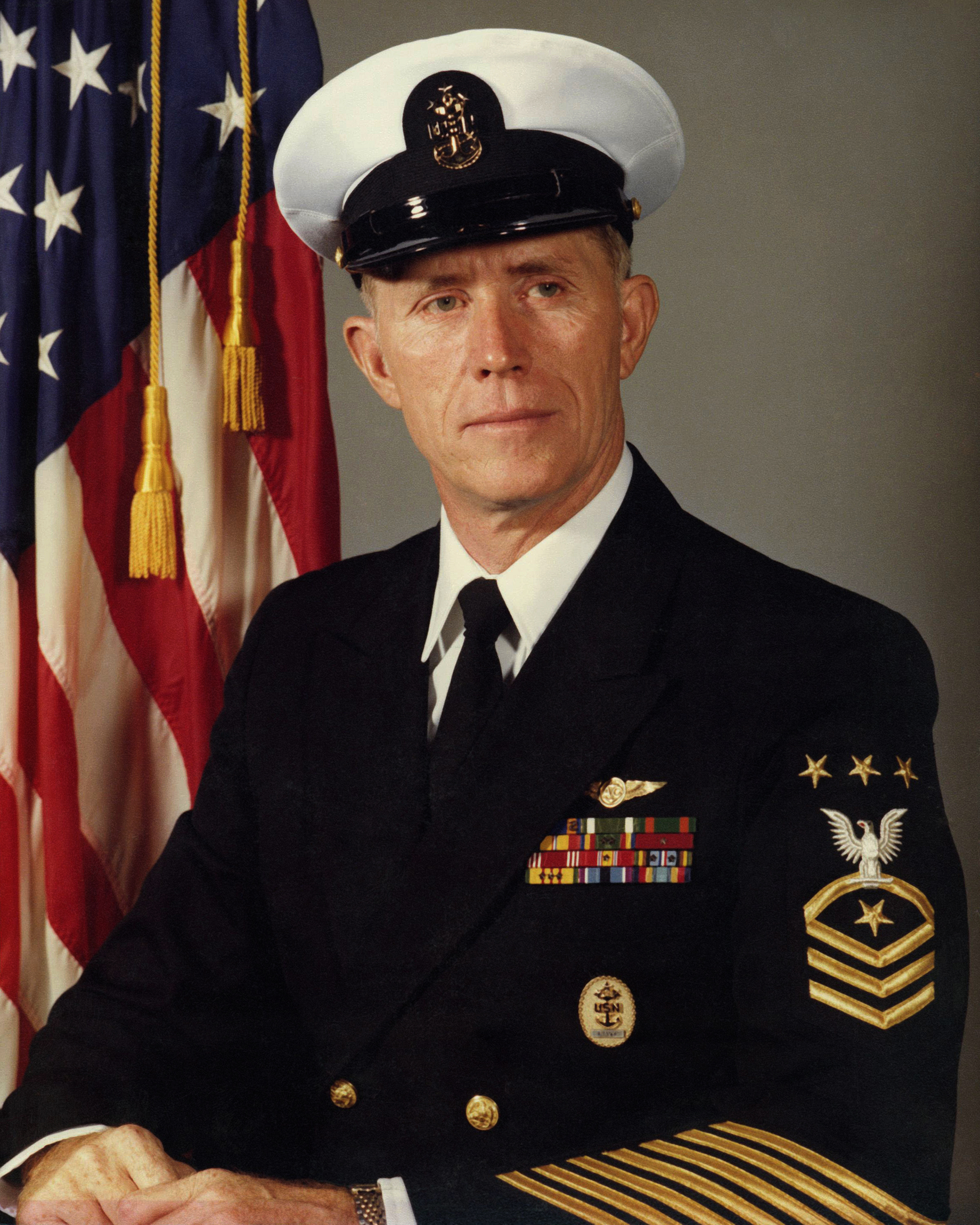
- Born: 21 July 1936; Montgomery, Alabama, U.S.
- Died: 6 November 2026 (aged 90)
- Military career
- Allegiance: United States
- Branch: United States Air Force (1954–1957); United States Navy (1958–1985)
- Service years: 1954–1985
- Rank: Master Chief Petty Officer of the Navy
- Commands: Master Chief Petty Officer of the Navy
- Conflicts: Vietnam War
- Awards: Navy Distinguished Service Medal; Air Medal (2); Navy and Marine Corps Commendation Medal; Navy and Marine Corps Achievement Medal
- Other work: Naval Aviation Museum Foundation, Pensacola, Florida

Billy C. Sanders (21 July 1936 – 6 November 2026) was a senior sailor of the United States Navy who served as the fifth Master Chief Petty Officer of the Navy.

== Military career ==
After graduating from high school, Sanders initially began his military career by joining the United States Air Force in February 1954. Upon being discharged in 1957, Sanders joined the Air Force Reserve. He attended Huntingdon College in Montgomery from January to May 1958.

Sanders enlisted in the United States Navy on 9 May 1958, and after receiving his clothing issue at Charleston, South Carolina, he was transferred to Naval Air Technical Training Center (NATTC) at NAS Memphis, Tennessee, to attend Aviation Electronics Technician "A" School. Upon graduation from "A" school at NATTC Glynco, Georgia, he reported for duty as an enlisted aircrewman on EC-121 type aircraft. He advanced to petty officer third class on 16 December 1959, and to petty officer second class on 16 November 1962.

He was transferred in March 1964 to attend an instructor training course at Memphis, and ultimately reported to Naval Air Maintenance Training Detachment (NAMTD) 1099 at NAS Key West, Florida, as an Anti-Submarine Warfare Systems Instructor. He returned to NATTC Memphis in June 1967 as a student, completing the avionics "B" school in February 1968. He advanced to chief petty officer on 16 February 1968.

Reconnaissance and Maintenance Squadron One, homeported at Atsugi, Japan, was his next assignment from May 1968 until June 1971. While serving as detachment chief petty officer at Da Nang, Vietnam, Sanders received two Air Medals and the Combat Action Ribbon. He advanced to senior chief petty officer on 1 March 1971.

In May 1971, Sanders was transferred to Naval Air Maintenance Training Detachment 1002 at NAS Albany, Georgia, and later at NAS Key West. He served as an instructor on RA-5C aircraft and Leading CPO during this tour. He was advanced to Master Chief Avionics Technician in August 1974. Sanders reported to Fighter Squadron 151 aboard USS Midway homeported in Yokosuka, Japan, in September 1974 where he served as maintenance chief on F-4N aircraft and as Command Master Chief. He was awarded the Navy Achievement Medal during this tour.

Sanders was transferred to NAS Pensacola, Florida, in October 1977 where he served as Air Operations Maintenance Chief until March 1978. He then served as Command Master Chief for NAS Pensacola and Training Air Wing Six.

He had been one of the six final candidates for selection as the fourth Master Chief Petty Officer of the Navy (MCPON) in 1979 but then-Chief of Naval Operations Admiral Thomas B. Hayward selected Thomas S. Crow for the job.

Sanders reported to Naval Air Facility Lajes, Azores, in February 1980 where he served as the maintenance chief and as command master chief. During this tour, he received the Navy Commendation Medal. As he neared the end of his MCPON tour, Crow suggested that Sanders apply again for selection as MCPON. Sanders declined but his commanding officer at Lajes nominated him anyway. Sanders transferred to the Naval Education and Training Program Development Center Saufley Field at Pensacola, Florida in February 1982 to serve as the Special Projects Division Officer, then on 16 July 1982, the new Chief of Naval Operations, Admiral James D. Watkins, announced that he had selected Sanders as the fifth Master Chief Petty Officer of the Navy. He was sworn in on 1 October 1982.

During Sanders' tenure as the MCPON, the grooming standards for sailors made a major change, as males were no longer authorized to wear beards. The first modern navy instruction governing physical readiness (OPNAVINST 6110.1) was written, the forerunner of the instruction still in use. Yearly physical readiness tests became mandatory, and body composition standards were introduced to the fleet. These tests late became bi-annual requirements. The Vietnam-era GI Bill had expired, and the modern GI Bill, which helps fund college educations for active duty military members and veterans, was created. As MCPON, Sanders made combating Navy voter apathy a top priority. In his travels around the fleet, Sanders encouraged sailors to get involved in the government they served. He advocated writing to their Congressional representatives to make their voice heard. He also stressed the role of senior enlisted leadership in the Navy chain of command.

== Later life and death ==
Sanders was relieved by William H. Plackett on 4 October 1985, as he retired from active duty. He later served as the executive assistant to the executive vice president of the Naval Aviation Museum Foundation in Pensacola, Florida. His wife, Mozelle, died in 1990.

Sanders died on 6 November 2026, at the age of 90.

== Awards and decorations ==
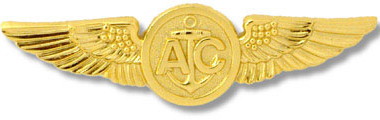
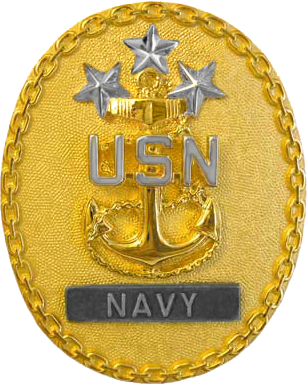
Naval Aircrew Warfare Specialist insignia
Master Chief Petty Officer of the Navy Identification Badge

Navy Distinguished Service Medal
Air Medal with bronze Strike/Flight numeral 2
Navy and Marine Corps Commendation Medal
Navy and Marine Corps Achievement Medal
Combat Action Ribbon
Navy Unit Commendation with two bronze service stars
Navy Good Conduct Medal with one silver and one bronze service stars
Army Good Conduct Medal
National Defense Service Medal with service star
Armed Forces Expeditionary Medal with two service stars
Vietnam Service Medal with three service stars
Humanitarian Service Medal
Navy Sea Service Deployment Ribbon

- 7 gold Service Stripes.

Military offices
Preceded by Thomas S. Crow	5th Master Chief Petty Officer of the Navy; 1 October 1982 – 4 October 1986	Succeeded by William H. Plackett
