= Lead petty officer =

Title in the US Navy

A leading petty officer (LPO) is a title given to the senior petty officer in the pay grades of E4-E6 in the United States Navy and Coast Guard. A LPO is the chief petty officer's "go-to person" for the lead of the division and to help with administrative tasks. While most often the leading petty officer is the senior ranking petty officer, this is not always the case. The LPO is chosen by the "leading chief petty officer" or LCPO (grade E7 or above) for his or her demonstrated leadership abilities and knowledge in the job or rating.
