= John Hagan (sailor) =

8th Master Chief Petty Officer of the US Navy (born 1946)

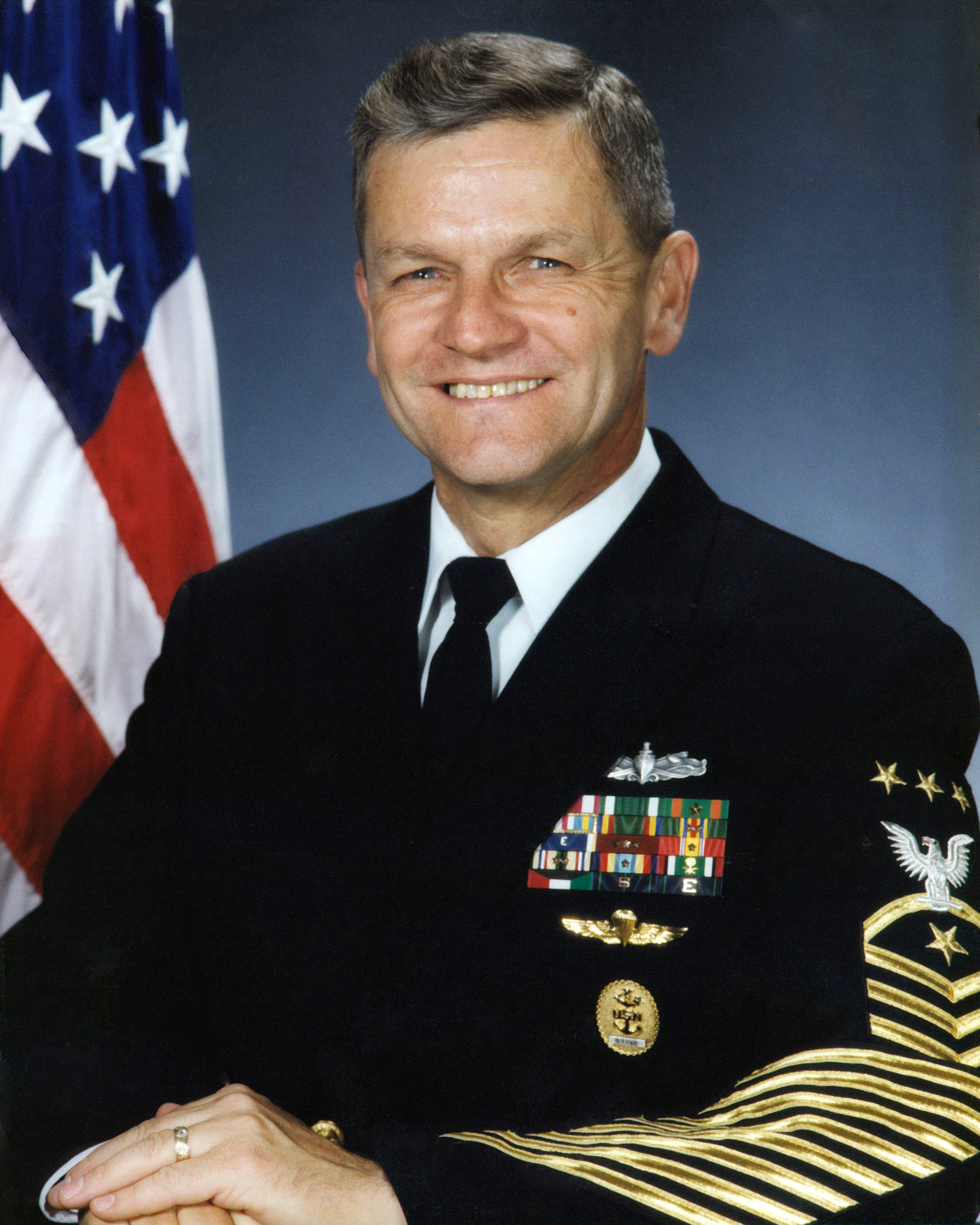
- Born: 20 May 1946 (age 80); Luton, England
- Military career
- Allegiance: United States
- Branch: United States Navy
- Service years: 1964–1998
- Rank: Master Chief Petty Officer of the Navy
- Commands: Master Chief Petty Officer of the Navy
- Conflicts: Gulf War: Operation Desert Shield; Operation Desert Storm
- Awards: Navy Distinguished Service Medal; Meritorious Service Medal; Navy Commendation Medal; Navy Achievement Medal (2)

John Hagan (born 20 May 1946) is a retired senior sailor of the United States Navy who served as the eighth Master Chief Petty Officer of the Navy.

== Early life and education ==
Hagan was born in Luton, England on 20 May 1946. He was born to an American father, serving in the United States Army Air Force, and a British mother, serving in the British Auxiliary Territorial Force (ATF the British counterpart to the US Army WACs). He moved to Asheville, North Carolina when he was an infant. He grew up and attended school there until his enlistment in the Navy.

== Naval career ==
After high school, Hagan enlisted in the United States Navy in December 1964 and attended basic training at Recruit Training Center, San Diego, California. He then attended Electronics Technician "A" School at Naval Training Center, Treasure Island, California, and completed a short assignment at Naval Air Test Center Patuxent River, Maryland.

After he completed Ground Control Approach Radar Technician School at Naval Air Technical Training Center, Glynco, Georgia, Hagan reported to Naval Air Station, Whidbey Island, Washington, ultimately becoming the Leading Petty Officer for the Air Search Radar Maintenance Division. During his tour there, he earned an Associate of Arts degree from Skagit Valley College and was the recipient of the President's Honor Medal (second highest GPA in the graduating class).

Hagan's next permanent assignment was aboard USS Lester (DE-1022), homeported in Naples, Italy. During a subsequent tour of sea duty as a support maintenance technician at Underwater Demolition Team 21 in Little Creek, Virginia, he was advanced to Chief Petty Officer and qualified as a naval parachutist. While assigned to a shore tour at Naval and Marine Corps Reserve Center in Louisville, Kentucky, he was advanced to senior chief petty officer. While there, he earned his Bachelor of Business Administration degree from McKendree University.

In September 1980, Hagan reported aboard USS Richmond K. Turner (CG-20), homeported in Charleston, South Carolina. While there, he qualified as an Enlisted Surface Warfare Specialist and was advanced to master chief petty officer. Shortly after reporting to his next assignment at the Naval Air Technical Training Center at Memphis, Tennessee, he was selected as the Force Master Chief for the Chief of Naval Technical Training.

In April 1988 Hagan reported to Pre-Commissioning Unit Philippine Sea (CG-58) in Bath. After the vessel's commissioning the following year, she reported to her homeport in Mayport, Florida, and subsequently deployed to the Red and Mediterranean Seas in support of Operation Desert Shield and Operation Desert Storm. During this tour of duty, he qualified as Officer of the Deck (Underway), and stood the OOD UW for his entire CMC tour.

Soon after reporting to Helicopter Anti-Submarine Warfare Squadron (Light) 48 at Mayport, Florida, as the command master chief, Hagan was selected as the eighth Master Chief Petty Officer of the Navy. He assumed his position on 28 August 1992.

Hagan served as MCPON for nearly six years, serving under three Chiefs of Naval Operations, Admiral Frank Kelso, Admiral Mike Boorda and Admiral Jay L. Johnson. This tour length anomaly was due in large part to the death of Admiral Boorda in May, 1996 and the subsequent request by Admiral Johnson that Hagan continue to serve. Hagan retired as MCPON in 1998.

== Personal life ==
Hagan is married to Cathy Hagan. They have three children, Robert Hagan, Melissa Smith, and Melody Blanchard. Robert Hagan, the oldest, retired from the Marine Corps in 2014 as a Colonel with 25 years service and is married to Linda Hagan, with two children. Melissa Smith is married to Deane Smith, who retired in June 2017 from a 30-year USCG career as a BMCM. She has three children. His youngest, Melody Blanchard was married (now divorced) to Lloyd Blanchard, a college professor at UCONN, they had one child. John continues leading his Chiefs through his active riding and mentoring role in the Old Dogs Veteran's Motorcycle Association.

== Awards and decorations ==
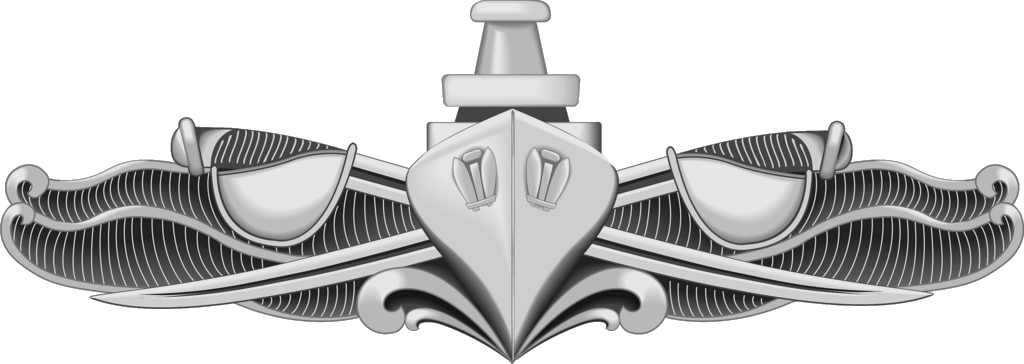
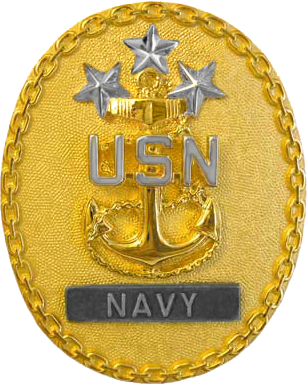
Enlisted Surface Warfare Specialist insignia
Navy and Marine Corps Parachutist Insignia
Master Chief Petty Officer of the Navy Badge

Navy Distinguished Service Medal
Meritorious Service Medal
Navy and Marine Corps Commendation Medal
Navy and Marine Corps Achievement Medal with one gold award star
Joint Meritorious Unit Award
Navy Unit Commendation
Navy Meritorious Unit Commendation with two service stars
Navy "E" Ribbon
Navy Good Conduct Medal with one silver and two bronze service stars
National Defense Service Medal with service star
Southwest Asia Service Medal with two service stars
Navy Sea Service Deployment Ribbon with service star
Kuwait Liberation Medal from Saudi Arabia
Kuwait Liberation Medal from Kuwait
Navy Rifle Marksmanship Ribbon with Sharpshooter Device
Navy Expert Pistol Shot Medal

- 8 gold service stripes.

Military offices
Preceded by Duane R. Bushey	8th Master Chief Petty Officer of the Navy; 28 August 1992 – 27 March 1998	Succeeded by James L. Herdt
