= Robert Walker (sailor) =

American Master Chief Petty Officer of the Navy (1929–2016)

Robert J. Walker
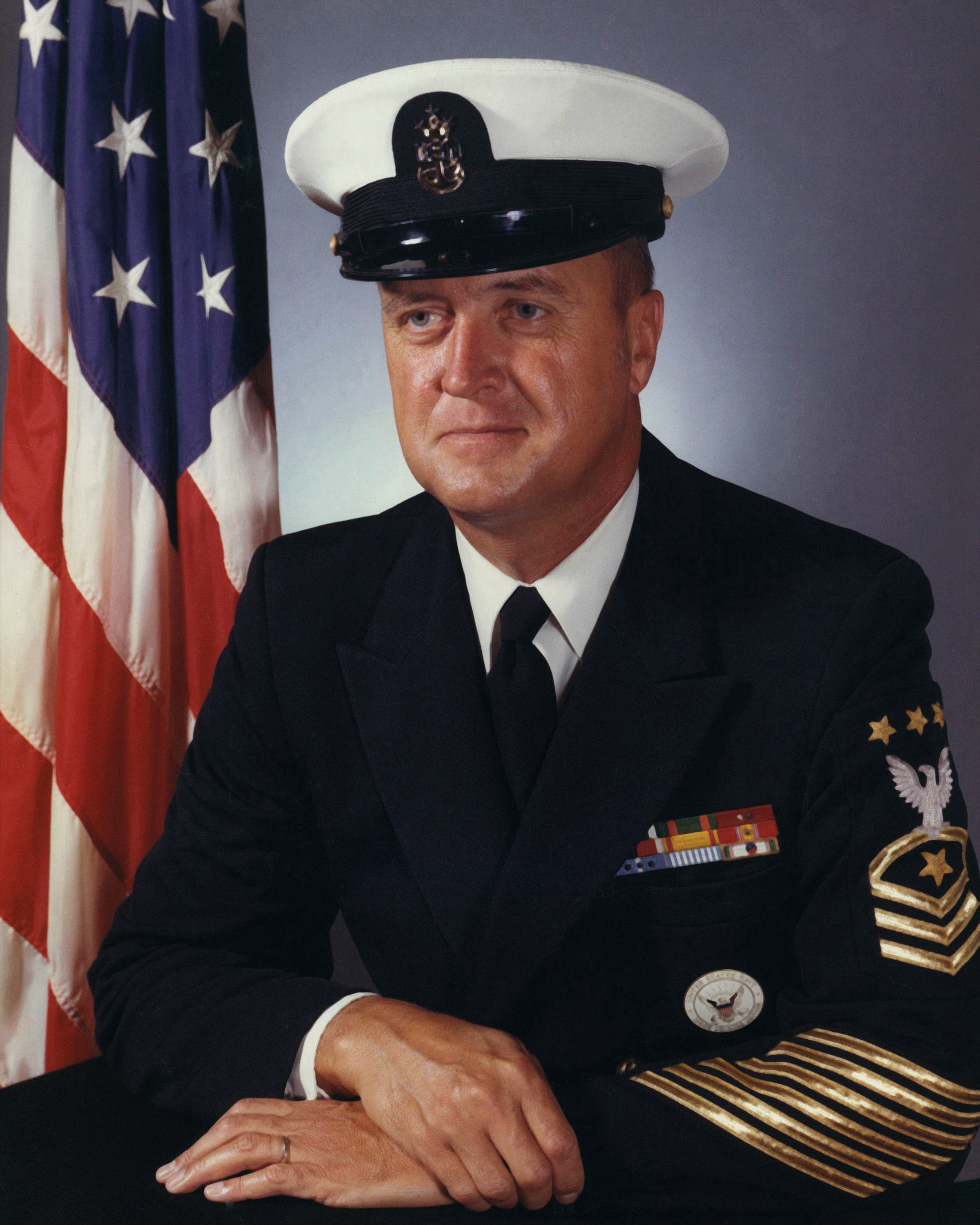
- Born: February 2, 1929; Baldwin, New York, U.S.
- Died: February 15, 2016 (aged 87); Virginia Beach, Virginia, U.S.
- Military career
- Allegiance: United States
- Branch: United States Navy
- Service years: 1948–1979
- Rank: Master Chief Petty Officer of the Navy
- Commands: Master Chief Petty Officer of the Navy
- Conflicts: Korean War
- Awards: Navy Distinguished Service Medal; Navy Commendation Medal; Navy Achievement Medal
- Other work: President, Non-Commissioned Officers Association

Robert James Walker, Sr. (February 2, 1929 – February 15, 2016) was a senior sailor in the United States Navy who served as the third Master Chief Petty Officer of the Navy. He was born in Baldwin, New York, and attended grammar and high school in Oxford, New York.

== Naval career ==
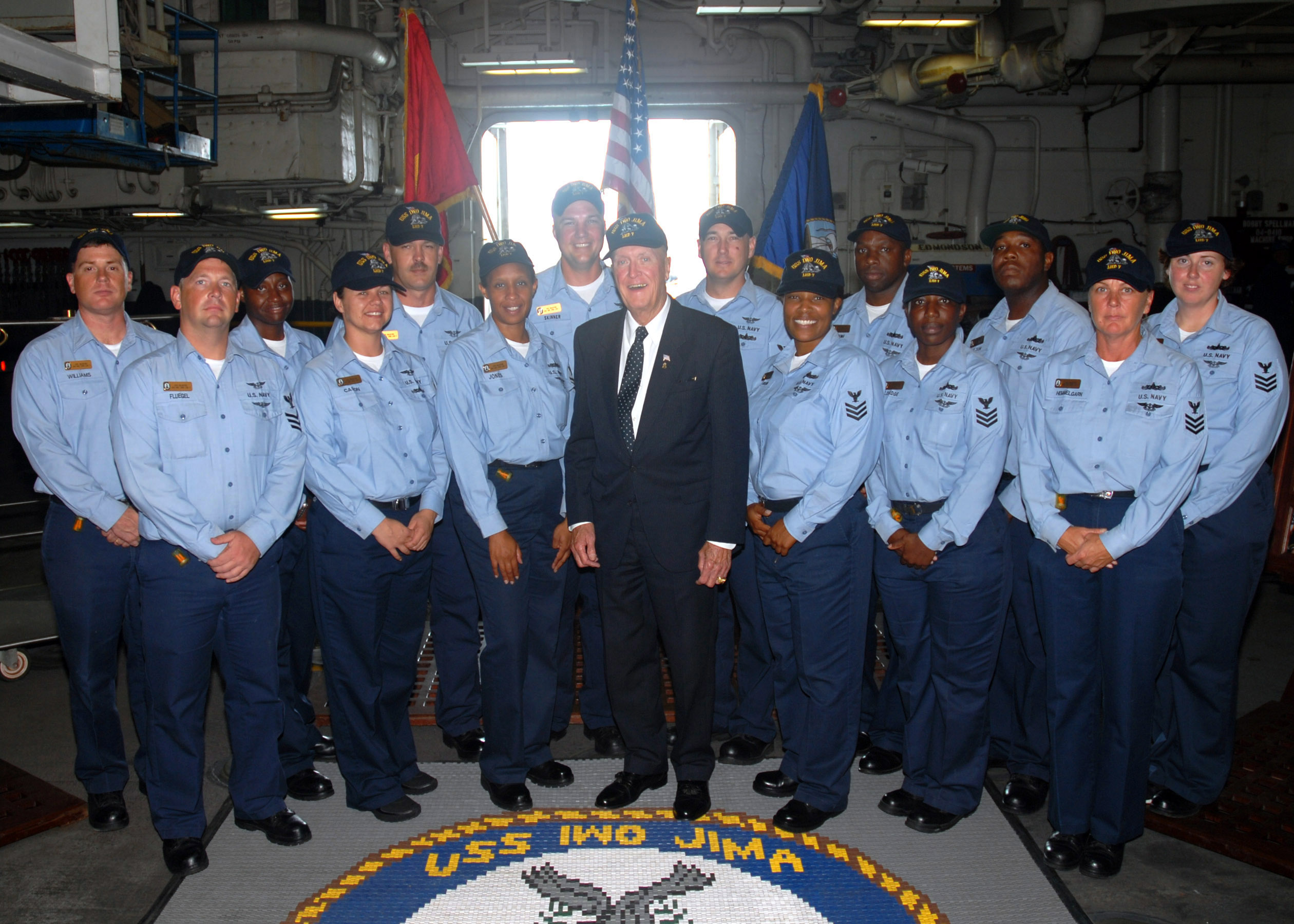
Walker in August 2007, visiting USS Iwo Jima.

Enlisting in the United States Navy in 1948, Walker received his recruit training at the Naval Training Center, Great Lakes, Illinois, where he was cited as company honorman. He then attended Radarman "A" School in Boston, Massachusetts and was assigned to the destroyer USS McKean (DD-784). Having advanced to radarman first class, Walker then served two-year tours aboard the destroyer escorts USS William Seiverling (DE-441) and USS Erben (DD-631). While aboard the Erben, he deployed to the Western Pacific in support of the Korean War. In October 1955, Walker reported to Norfolk, Virginia, as instructor at Radarman "A" School. In June 1956, after just eight years of active service, he was promoted to chief petty officer, which was at the time the highest enlisted rank in the navy.

Following advanced schooling in Radarman "B" School at Treasure Island and San Diego, Walker was assigned to USS Guardian (AGR-1). Homeported in Davisville, Rhode Island, the Guardian was a converted World War II liberty ship being used for radar surveillance. During this tour, Walker was advanced to the newly created rank of senior chief petty officer in 1961 and at the relatively young age of 34, reached the pinnacle of the enlisted ranks and was promoted to master chief on November 16, 1963.

Walker began his second tour of shore duty in 1964 as Director of Training, Radarman “A” School, Great Lakes, Illinois. Three years later, he reported aboard the destroyer USS Harlan R. Dickson (DD-708) at Newport, Rhode Island, where he was assigned various command duties including senior enlisted advisor and leading chief for combat systems training at the Fleet Combat Direction Systems Training Center, Dam Neck, Virginia. For his outstanding performance, he was awarded the Navy Achievement Medal.

In July 1972, Walker reported aboard the aircraft carrier USS John F. Kennedy (CV-67). He acted as leading chief of the Kennedy's Operations Department and later, as master chief petty officer of the command. For his excellent performance in this capacity, he was awarded the Navy Commendation Medal. In October 1972, the Radarman rating was changed to Operations Specialist and Walker automatically converted to the latter at that time. In November 1974, Walker was selected to serve as Master Chief Petty Officer of the Force, Naval Air Force, United States Atlantic Fleet.

On September 26, 1975, Walker was sworn in as the third Master Chief Petty Officer of the Navy (MCPON). Walker was a much more conservative, traditional MCPON than his predecessor, John Whittet.

== Advocacy ==
During his term, Walker often raised the ire of some by identifying directors of Navy programs who were not serving the best interests of the navy (such as a director of the Board of Corrections of Naval Records, and a commander in Pearl Harbor who was separating sailors for being overweight even though he himself was obese) and saw to their quick removal. He was instrumental in creating the Navy's Senior Enlisted Academy, from which virtually all subsequent MCPONs were graduates. He also brought about the Enlisted Surface Warfare Specialist program, to add the same professionalism and thorough platform knowledge within the surface community that had been present for decades in the submarine community.

Walker fought for increases in sea pay, improvements in off-duty education opportunities, consolidation of the three-form system of enlisted evaluation reports into a uniform format, and a return to the traditional "crackerjacks" phased out by ADM Zumwalt. Personnel records were moved to microfiche vice paper to streamline archival, storage and retrieval. They have since been completely computerized. Many of these changes would not take effect until after Walker's MCPON tour ended, but he was the driving force behind their implementation.

== Retirement and later life ==
Walker retired on September 28, 1979, immediately after the swearing in of his successor, Thomas S. Crow. He remained active following his retirement, serving as President of the Non-Commissioned Officers Association. In 1990, Robert J. Walker Hall, the home of Operations Specialist "A" School at Fleet Combat Training Center Atlantic, Dam Neck, Virginia was named for him. He died February 15, 2016, at the age of 87.

== Military awards and decorations ==
Navy Distinguished Service Medal
Navy and Marine Corps Commendation Medal
Navy and Marine Corps Achievement Medal
Navy Good Conduct Medal (7 awards)
Navy Occupation Service Medal
China Service Medal
National Defense Service Medal (2 awards)
Korean Service Medal
Presidential Unit Citation (Korea)
United Nations Korea Medal
Korean War Service Medal

- Senior Enlisted Advisor Badge.
- 7 gold Service Stripes.

Military offices
Preceded by John Whittet	3rd Master Chief Petty Officer of the Navy; 25 September 1975 – 28 September 1979	Succeeded by Thomas S. Crow
