= Rick West (sailor) =

12th Master Chief Petty Officer of the US Navy

Rick D. West
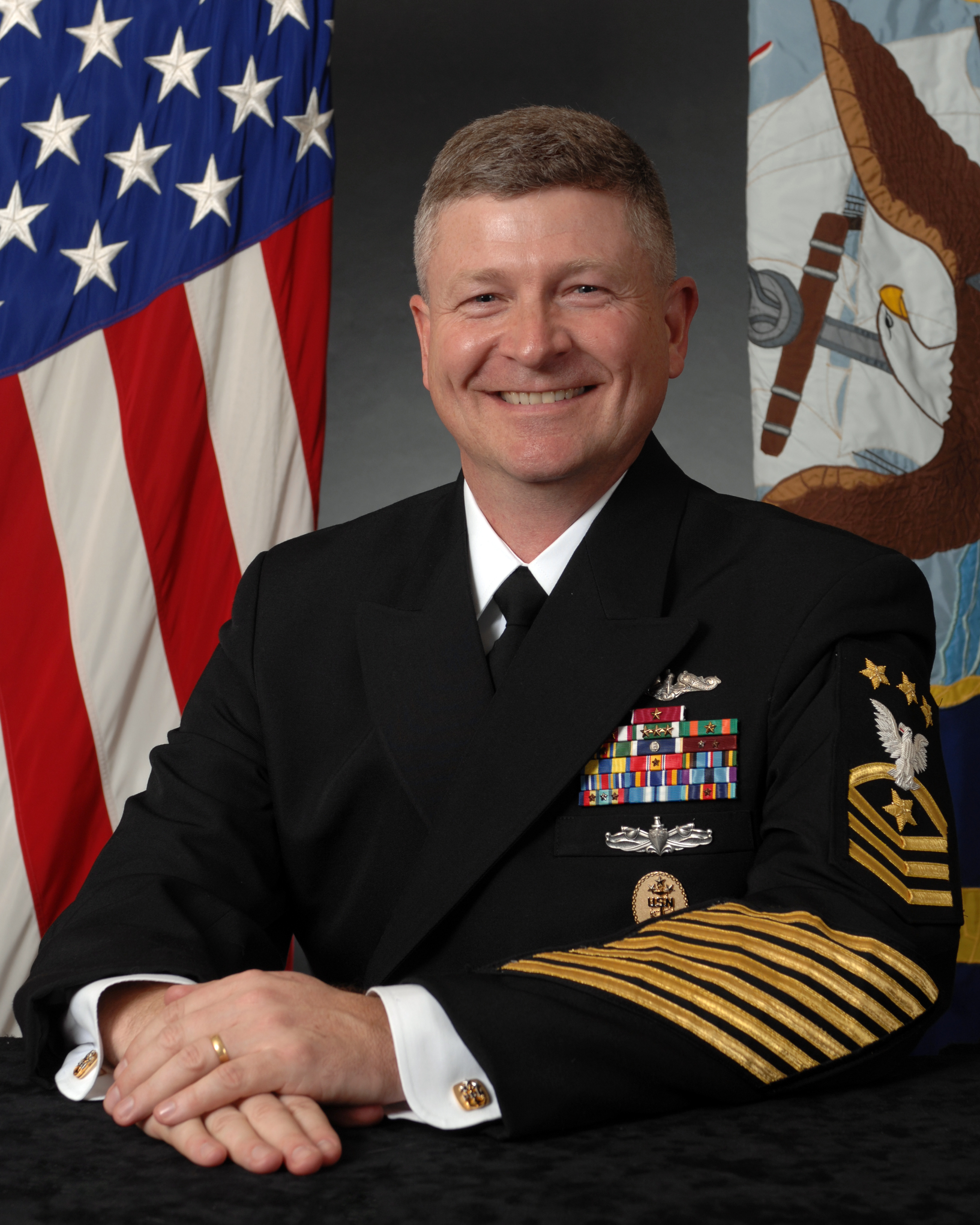
- West in December 2008
- Born: 1963 (age 62–63); Rising Fawn, Georgia, U.S.
- Military career
- Allegiance: United States
- Branch: United States Navy
- Service years: 1981–2012
- Rank: Master Chief Petty Officer of the Navy
- Commands: Master Chief Petty Officer of the Navy
- Conflicts: Global War on Terrorism
- Awards: Navy Distinguished Service Medal; Legion of Merit (2); Meritorious Service Medal (3); Navy and Marine Corps Commendation Medal (4); Navy and Marine Corps Achievement Medal (2)

Rick D. West (born 1963) is a retired United States Navy sailor who served as the 12th master chief petty officer of the Navy.

== Early life and education ==
West was born in 1963 in Rising Fawn, Georgia, and graduated from Northwest Georgia High School in Trenton, Georgia, in 1981.

== Naval career ==
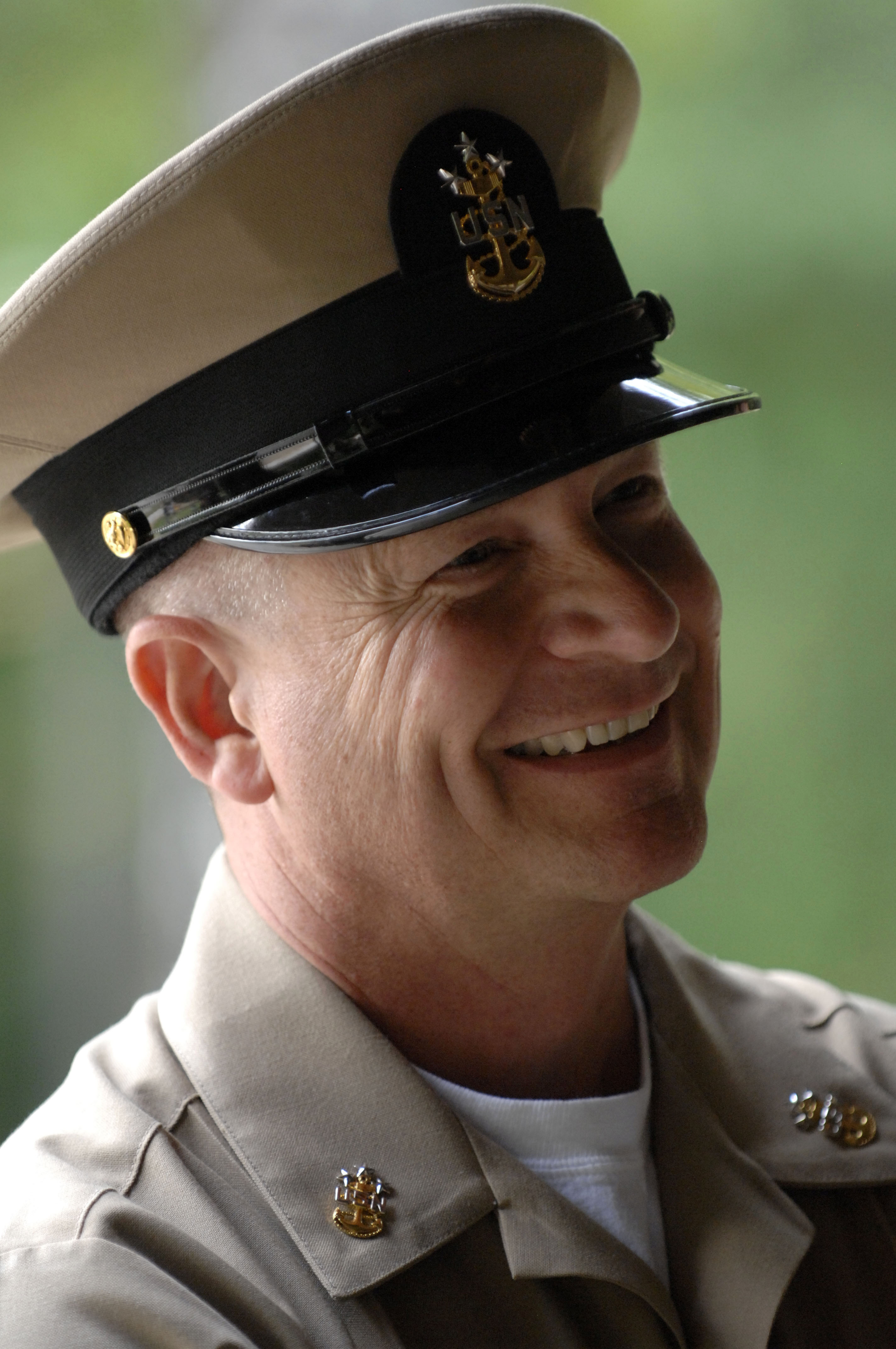
West at the Skymont Boy Scout Camp in June 2009.

After graduating from high school, West enlisted in the United States Navy. He received recruit training and Quartermaster training at Orlando, Florida, followed by Enlisted Submarine School at Naval Submarine Base New London in Groton, Connecticut. His first duty assignment was on board USS Ethan Allen, where he completed Submarine Qualifications. Other assignments include USS Thomas A. Edison, USS Sea Devil, Commander Naval Activities United Kingdom, USS Tecumseh (Blue), and Tactical Readiness Evaluation team on COMSUBPAC Staff.

=== Leadership assignments ===
West was then assigned as Chief of the Boat on board the San Diego–based Fast Attack Submarine USS Portsmouth, completing two Western Pacific deployments. The crew earned two Battle Efficiency "E" awards. He then served as command master chief at Commander, Submarine Squadron Eleven. Upon completion of his tour, he was selected as force master chief and attended the Senior Enlisted Academy in Newport, Rhode Island.

West served as force master chief, Submarine Force, United States Pacific Fleet (COMSUBPAC) from January 2001 to January 2004.

West was then assigned to USS Preble homeported in San Diego, where he completed a deployment to the Persian Gulf and qualified as Enlisted Surface Warfare Specialist. He was selected during his tour on the USS Preble to serve as United States Pacific Fleet, fleet master chief, from February 2005 to June 2007. Since 2007, West had served as the 14th fleet master chief for Commander, United States Fleet Forces Command, prior to his selection as Master Chief Petty Officer of the Navy (MCPON) beginning December 12, 2008.

On December 12, 2008, West accepted the passing of the ceremonial cutlass from outgoing MCPON Joe R. Campa. On September 28, 2012, he stepped down as MCPON and retired from the navy after a three-decade career.

== Awards and decorations ==
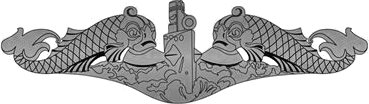

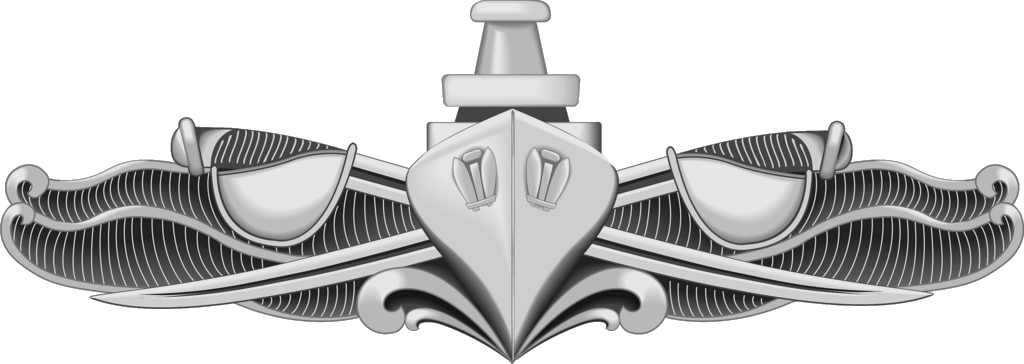
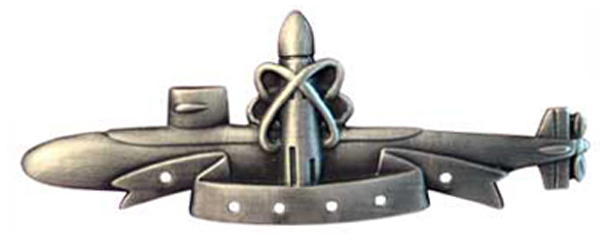
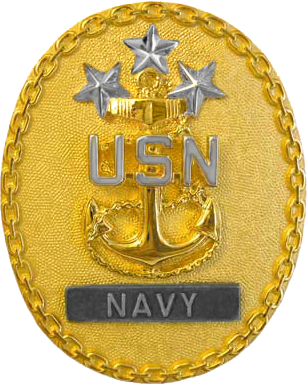

Badge	Enlisted Submarine Warfare Insignia		
1st Row	Navy Distinguished Service Medal		Legion of Merit (with gold award star)
2nd Row	Meritorious Service Medal (with two award stars)	Navy and Marine Corps Commendation Medal (with three award stars)	Navy and Marine Corps Achievement Medal (with award star)
3rd Row	Navy Meritorious Unit Commendation (with bronze service star)	Navy "E" Ribbon w/ Wreathed Battle E device	Navy Good Conduct Medal (with one silver and two bronze service stars)
4th Row	Navy Expeditionary Medal	National Defense Service Medal (with service star)	Armed Forces Expeditionary Medal
5th Row	Global War on Terrorism Expeditionary Medal	Global War on Terrorism Service Medal	Humanitarian Service Medal
6th Row	Navy Sea Service Deployment Ribbon (with one silver and two bronze service stars)	Navy Arctic Service Ribbon	Navy & Marine Corps Overseas Service Ribbon (with service star)
Badge	Enlisted Surface Warfare Specialist Insignia		
Badge	Silver SSBN Deterrent Patrol Insignia		
Badge	Master Chief Petty Officer of the Navy identification badge		

Military offices
Preceded by Joe Campa	12th Master Chief Petty Officer of the Navy; December 12, 2008 – September 28, 2012	Succeeded by Michael D. Stevens
