= Terry D. Scott =

United States Navy sailor

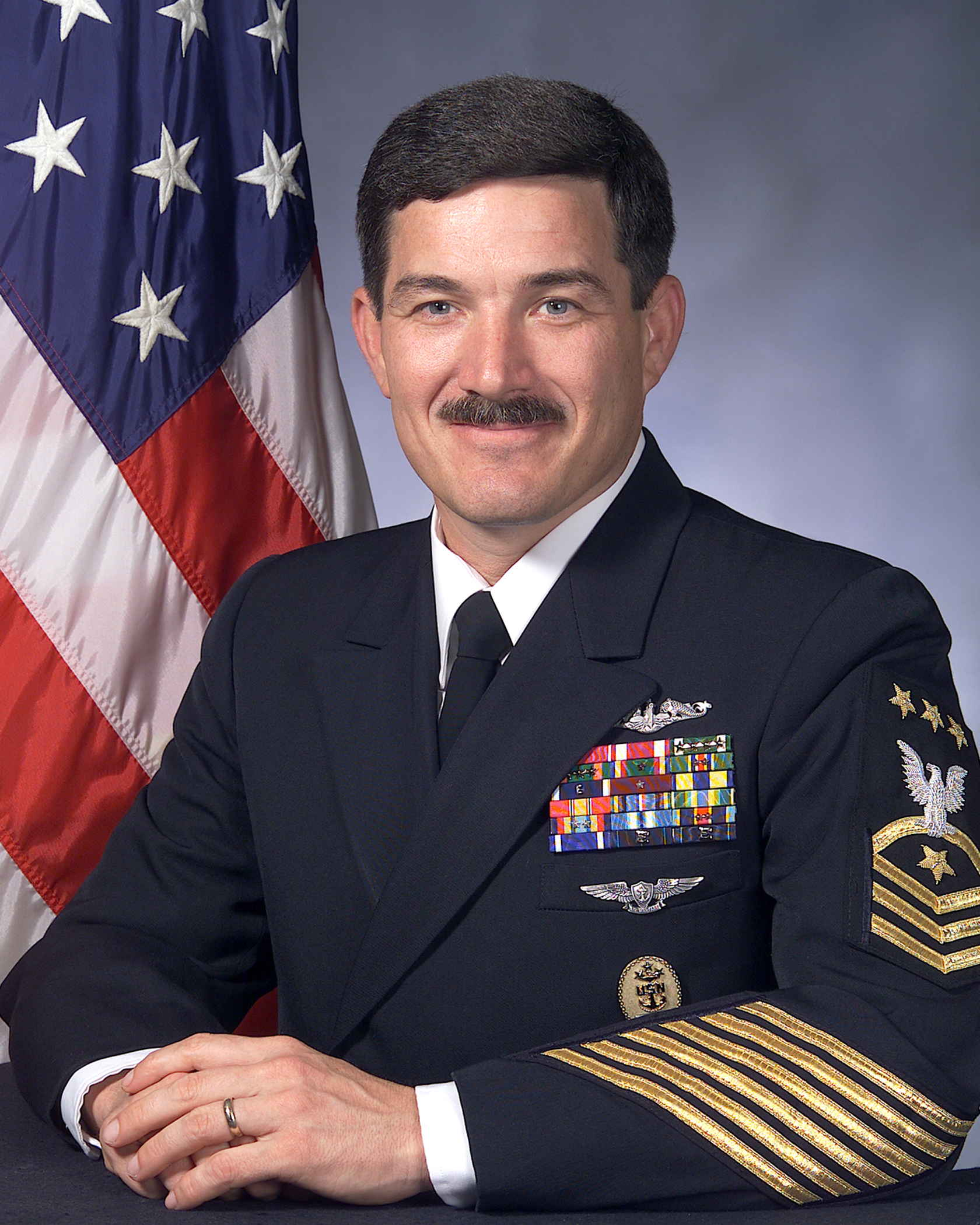
- Scott in 2002
- Born: Buffalo, Missouri, U.S.
- Military career
- Allegiance: United States of America
- Branch: United States Navy
- Service years: 1976–2006
- Rank: Master Chief Petty Officer of the Navy
- Awards: Legion of Merit; Meritorious Service Medal

Terry D. Scott is a former United States Navy sailor, who served as the 10th Master Chief Petty Officer of the Navy, from April 22, 2002, to July 10, 2006.

== Early life and education ==
Scott was born in Buffalo, Missouri. Before enlisting in the U.S. Navy, he lived in Louisburg, Kansas.

== Career ==
Scott joined the U.S. Navy in December 1976 and began his active-duty service in 1977. He completed the Missile Technician training, Basic Enlisted Submarine School, and the Navy's Instructor Training school; he was later certified as a master training specialist. He graduated with honors from the U.S. Navy Senior Enlisted Academy in 1990 and received a bachelor of science degree from Southern Illinois University. During his 29 years of service in the Navy, he was awarded the Legion of Merit, the Meritorious Service Medal, and multiple Navy commendation and achievement medals.

== Duty stations ==
Sea duty:

- USS John Adams (SSBN-620)
- USS James Madison (SSBN-627) - Missile Division-leading chief petty officer
- USS Jacksonville (SSN-699) - chief of the boat
- Strike Fighter Squadron 192 - command master chief

Shore duty:

- Fleet Ballistic Missile Submarine Training Center, Charleston, South Carolina - qualified as master training specialist
- Holy Loch, Scotland, assigned to Commander, Submarine Squadron 14 embarked in USS Simon Lake (AS-33) - squadron missile technician
- Commander, Submarine Force, United States Atlantic Fleet (COMSUBLANT) - senior enlisted nuclear weapons technical inspector and department-leading chief petty officer
- Naval Security Group Activity, Winter Harbor — command master chief
- Naval Forces, Central Command and Fifth Fleet — CNO-directed command master chief

== Awards and decorations ==
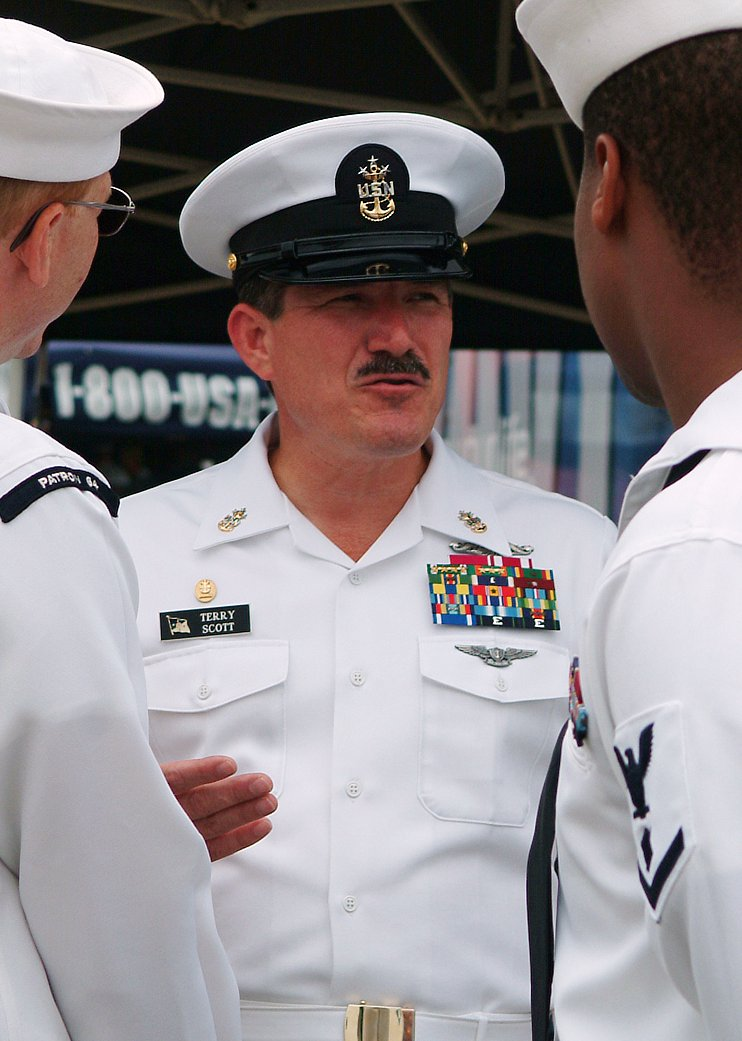
Scott in 2005

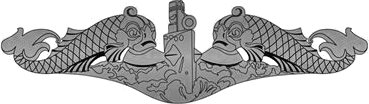
- Enlisted Submarine Warfare Insignia
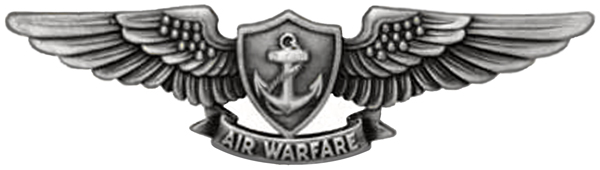
- Enlisted Aviation Warfare Specialist insignia
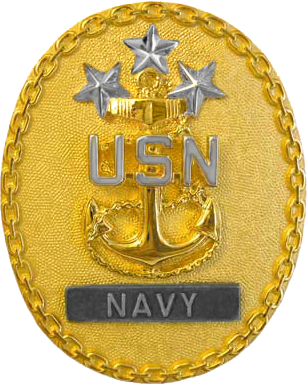
- Master Chief Petty Officer of the Navy Identification Badge

Navy Distinguished Service Medal
Legion of Merit
Meritorious Service Medal
Navy and Marine Corps Commendation Medal (5)
Navy and Marine Corps Achievement Medal (4)
Navy Unit Commendation (2)
Navy Meritorious Unit Commendation (3)
Navy "E" Ribbon
Navy Good Conduct Medal (8)
Navy Expeditionary Medal
National Defense Service Medal (2)
Armed Forces Expeditionary Medal
Global War on Terrorism Expeditionary Medal
Global War on Terrorism Service Medal
Armed Forces Service Medal
Navy Sea Service Deployment Ribbon (11)
Arctic Service Ribbon
Navy and Marine Corps Overseas Service Ribbon (4)
NATO Medal for the former Yugoslavia
Navy Expert Rifleman Medal
Navy Expert Pistol Shot Medal

- Seven gold service stripes

Military offices
Preceded by James L. Herdt	10th Master Chief Petty Officer of the Navy; 22 April 2002 - 10 July 2006	Succeeded by Joe Campa
