= Joe Campa =

11th Master Chief Petty Officer of the Navy

Joe R. Campa Jr.
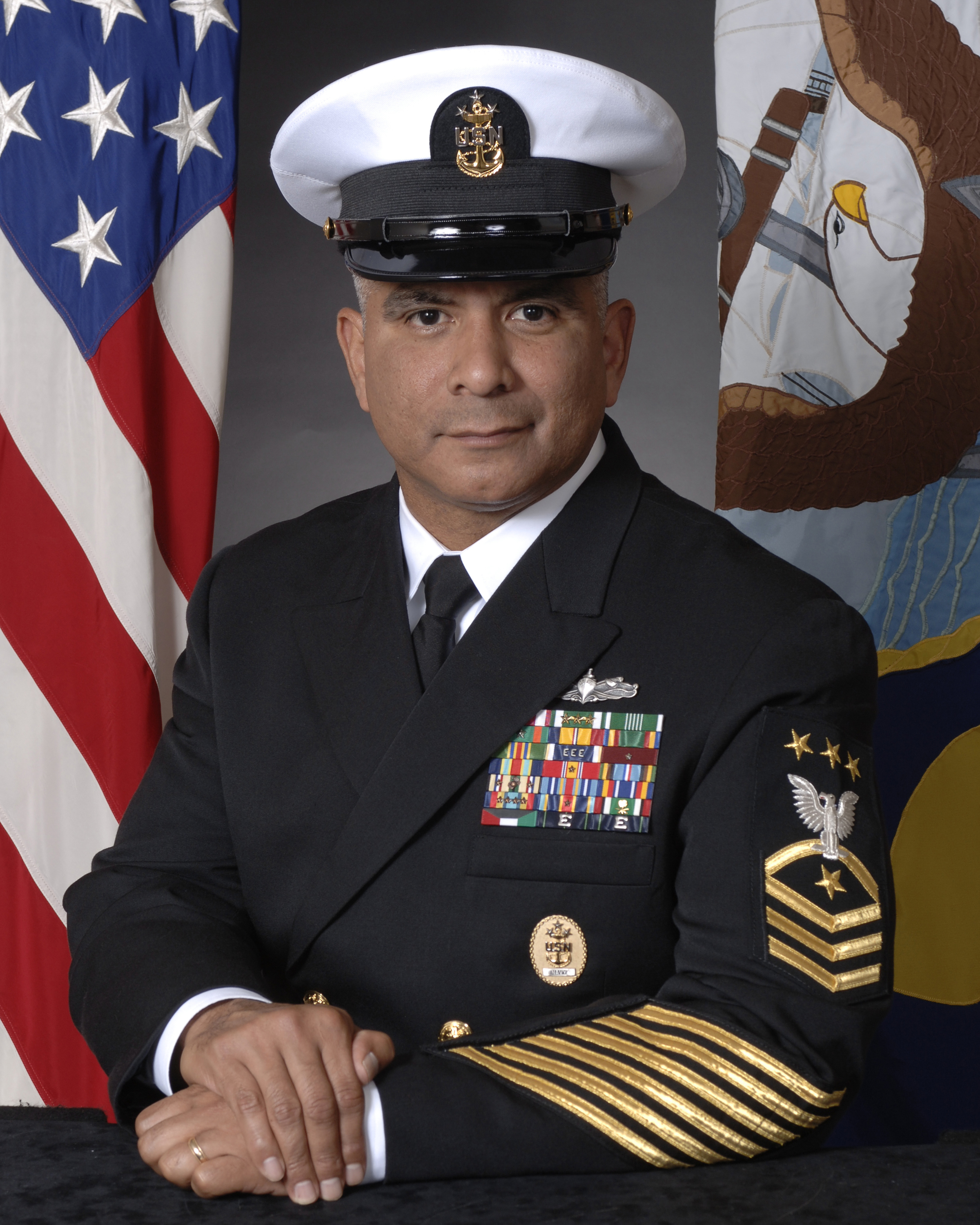
- Campa in December 2006
- Born: Lynwood, California, U.S.
- Military career
- Allegiance: United States
- Branch: United States Navy
- Service years: 1980–2009
- Rank: Master Chief Petty Officer of the Navy
- Commands: Master Chief Petty Officer of the Navy
- Conflicts: Gulf War; Global War on Terrorism
- Awards: Navy Distinguished Service Medal; Meritorious Service Medal (2); Navy and Marine Corps Commendation Medal (4); Army Commendation Medal; Navy and Marine Corps Achievement Medal (6)

Joe R. Campa Jr. is a retired United States Navy sailor who served as the 11th Master Chief Petty Officer of the Navy.

== Early life and education ==
Campa was born in Lynwood, California and grew up in Southern California. Campa is a distinguished honor graduate of the United States Navy Senior Enlisted Academy. He also graduated from the United States Army Sergeants Major Academy in May 2003 and completed the Command Sergeants Major course. He holds a Bachelor of Science degree from Excelsior University. In March 2006 he graduated from the Naval War College with a Master of Arts degree in National Security and Strategic Studies.

== Naval career ==
Campa enlisted in the United States Navy on 2 June 1980. He completed Recruit Training and Hospital Corpsman "A" School in San Diego, California.

Campa's duty assignments include USS Ogden (LPD-5), San Diego; Naval Medical Center, San Diego, California; Seventh Marine Regiment, First Marine Division, Camp Pendleton; Naval Hospital, Long Beach, California; Third Force Service Support Group, Fleet Marine Force, Okinawa, Japan; Naval Hospital Bremerton, Washington; First Force Service Support Group during the Gulf War; USS Comstock (LSD-45) San Diego, California; and Naval Training Center, Great Lakes, Illinois.

Campa was selected to the command master chief program in May 1999. He reported to USS Curtis Wilbur (DDG-54) in Yokosuka, Japan as command master chief in November 1999 and served until June 2002.

During his tour aboard Curtis Wilbur, the ship deployed to the North Arabian Sea in support of Operation Enduring Freedom. From June 2003 to February 2005, Campa served as the command master chief for USS Frank Cable (AS-40), homeported in Guam. He was then the command master chief at Joint Task Force Guantanamo Bay, Cuba. He was sworn in as Master Chief Petty Officer of the Navy (MCPON) 11 in July 2006.

As MCPON, Campa will be best remembered for "resetting" the Chief Petty Officers' Mess, changing the role of the chiefs from the perceived Naval Officer duties and functions they were carrying out, to more a role of "Deckplate Leadership," where chiefs are expected to "be on deck with their Sailors, directly leading & mentoring them and being the technical expert of their equipment." He created the chiefs' "Mission, Vision and Guiding Principles," a written set of expectations and guidance on how to conduct themselves as chiefs, which led to a change of the chiefs' evaluation system, using those seven "Guiding Principles" as benchmarks for grading criteria in chiefs' performance.

=== Retirement ===
On 7 November 2008, Campa announced his plans to step down as MCPON on 12 December 2008 and to retire on 1 April 2009. On 5 December 2008, Fleet Master Chief Rick D. West was announced as the 12th MCPON. Campa received the Navy Distinguished Service Medal during his retirement ceremony.

== Awards and decorations ==
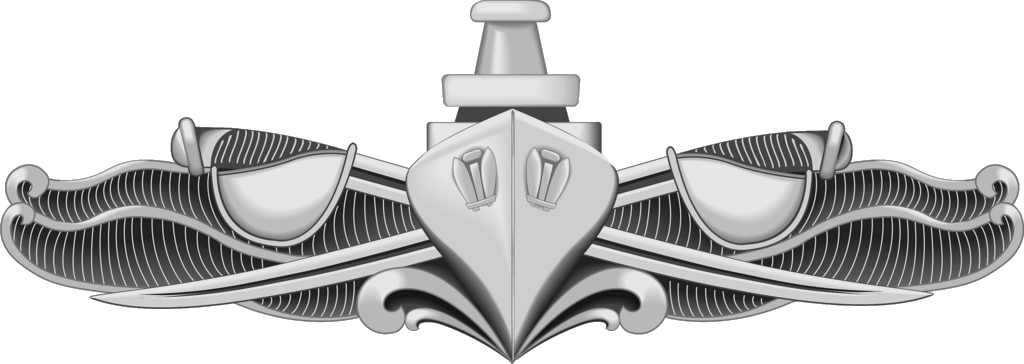

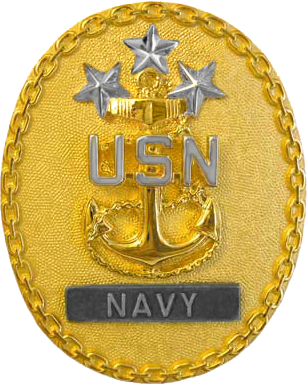

Badge	Enlisted Surface Warfare Specialist Insignia		
1st Row		Navy Distinguished Service Medal	
2nd Row	Meritorious Service Medal (2 awards)	Navy and Marine Corps Commendation Medal (4 awards)	Army Commendation Medal
3rd Row	Navy and Marine Corps Achievement Medal (6 awards)	Combat Action Ribbon	Navy Unit Commendation
4th Row	Navy Meritorious Unit Commendation Ribbon	Navy "E" Ribbon w/ 3 Battle E devices	Navy Good Conduct Medal (8 awards)
5th Row	Fleet Marine Force Ribbon	National Defense Service Medal (2 awards)	Armed Forces Expeditionary Medal
6th Row	Southwest Asia Service Medal with FMF (2 campaign stars)	Global War on Terrorism Expeditionary Medal	Global War on Terrorism Service Medal
7th Row	Navy Sea Service Deployment Ribbon (5 awards)	Navy Overseas Service Ribbon (2 awards)	Kuwait Liberation Medal from Saudi Arabia
8th Row	Kuwait Liberation Medal from Kuwait	Navy Expert Rifleman Medal	Navy Expert Pistol Shot Medal
Badge	Master Chief Petty Officer of the Navy identification badge		

- Campa earned 7 service stripes.

== See also ==
- Hispanics in the United States Navy

Military offices
Preceded by Terry D. Scott	11th Master Chief Petty Officer of the Navy; 10 July 2006 – 12 December 2008	Succeeded by Rick West
