= Steven S. Giordano =

14th Master Chief Petty Officer of the US Navy

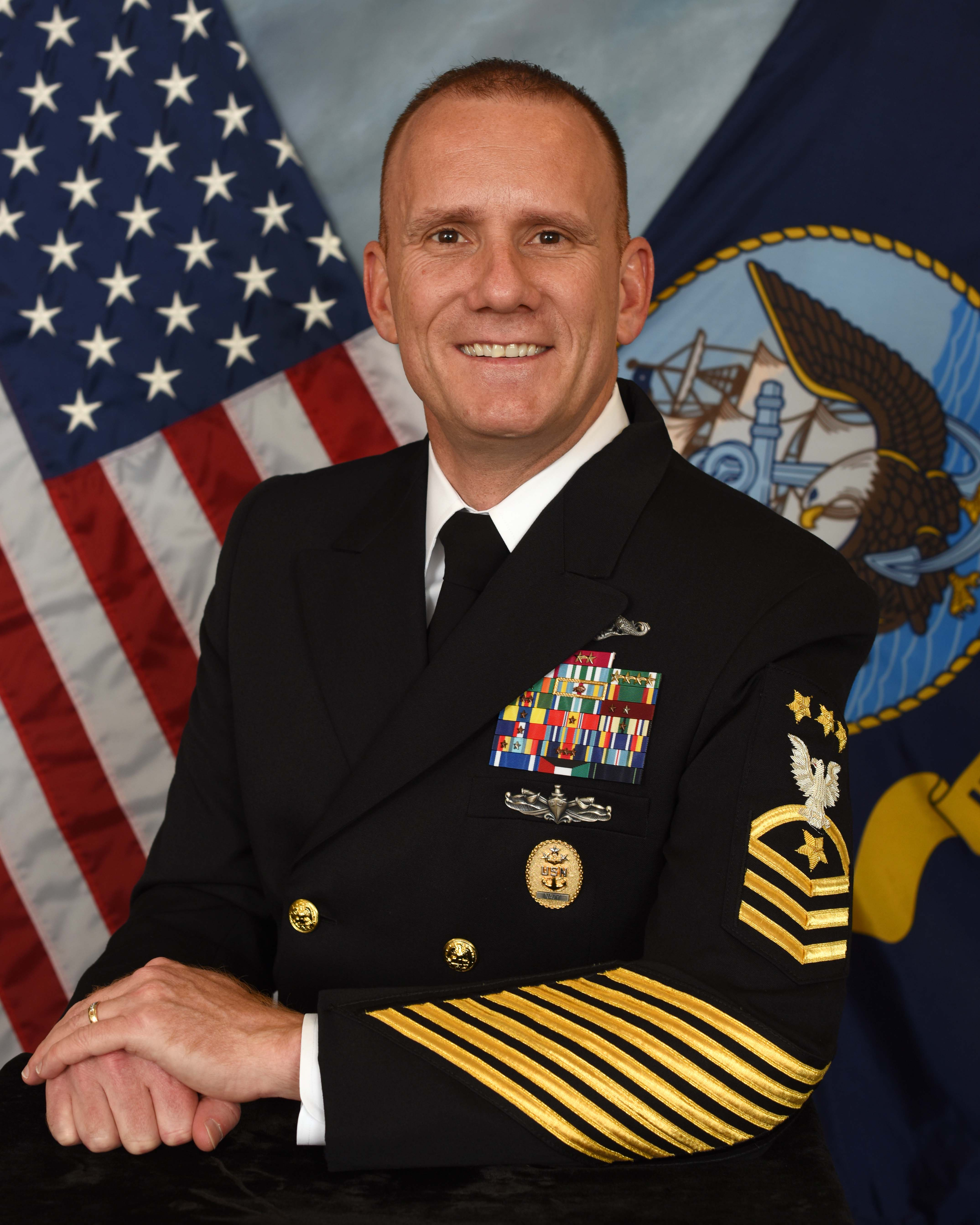
- Giordano in 2017
- Born: Baltimore, Maryland, U.S.
- Spouse: Elka Giordano (wife)
- Military career
- Allegiance: United States
- Branch: United States Navy
- Service years: 1989–2018
- Rank: Master Chief Petty Officer of the Navy
- Commands: Master Chief Petty Officer of the Navy
- Conflicts: Gulf War
- Awards: Legion of Merit (3); Meritorious Service Medal; Joint Service Commendation Medal; Navy and Marine Corps Commendation Medal (5); Navy and Marine Corps Achievement Medal (7)

Steven S. Giordano is a retired United States Navy sailor who served as the 14th Master Chief Petty Officer of the Navy.

== Naval career ==
A native of Baltimore, Maryland, Following completion of basic training at Naval Training Center Orlando Recruit Training Command Orlando, Florida, he reported to Naval Air Station Pensacola Corry Station Naval Technical Training Center in Pensacola, Florida, completing cryptologic technician technical training. Giordano later completed a Bachelor of Science degree in Management, is a graduate of the U.S. Navy Senior Enlisted Academy and the National Defense University Keystone course. He is designated a specialist in submarine, surface, and information warfare.

=== 1990s ===
Giordano's early assignments include a tour at Fleet Air Reconnaissance Squadron 1 (VQ-1) in Agana, Guam, serving as a signals analyst and reporter, an operational deployment to the Naval Security Group detachment, Bahrain in support of the Persian Gulf War's Operations Desert Shield and Desert Storm. After four years at VQ-1, Giordano received orders to NSGA Pearl Harbor, Hawaii completing numerous operational deployments aboard United States Pacific Fleet Pacific Fleet combatants and earning his Submarine Warfare designation. His next assignment was at the National Security Agency/Central Security Service (NSA/CSS) Fort Meade, Maryland as an analyst with the Advanced Maritime Analysis Cell.

In 1996, Giordano, then a cryptologic tech first class petty officer, committed adultery with his subordinate of the command, a married sailor whose husband was a member of the cryptology community that was stationed elsewhere. Giordano's commanding officer found Giordano guilty of violating Article 134 of the Uniform Code of Military Justice during nonjudicial punishment, a catchall used to discipline personnel whose conduct harms good order or brings discredit on the armed forces. Giordano was reduced in rate to petty officer second class as punishment, as United States military regulations prohibit adultery.

In October 1999, Giordano reported to NSGA Rota, Spain, completing three operational deployments and serving aboard one allied combatant. Giordano then reported to the Center for Naval Leadership Pensacola, Florida for duties as the Entry Level ELINT School Course Manager and LCPO. During this assignment, he was designated Master Training Specialist.

=== 2000s ===
In 2004, Giordano reported to Navy Information Operations Command Fort Gordon, Georgia as the Fleet Cryptologic Augmentation Center Division Chief and Fleet Operations Department Leading Chief Petty Officer. Giordano graduated from the United States Navy Senior Enlisted Academy Class 133 and reported on staff as a faculty advisor in September 2007.

Giordano then became command master chief aboard the frigate USS McClusky FFG-41 (6), earning the Surface Warfare designation.

=== 2010s ===
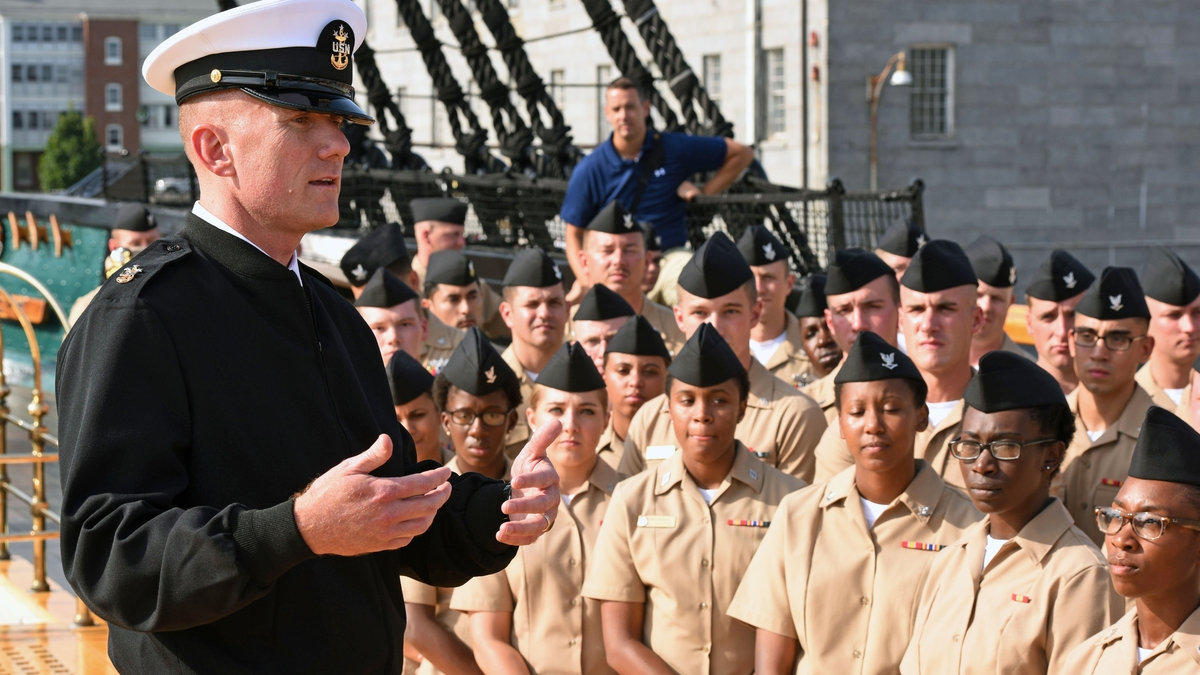
Giordano speaking to sailors at the USS Constitution in September 2016.

In December 2010, Giordano became Command Master Chief at Navy Information Operations Command Colorado, earning the Information Dominance Warfare designation. From December 2012 to February 2015 he served as force master chief for Navy Information Dominance Forces, and from 2015 to 2016 he served as fleet master chief for United States Naval Forces Europe - Naval Forces Africa.

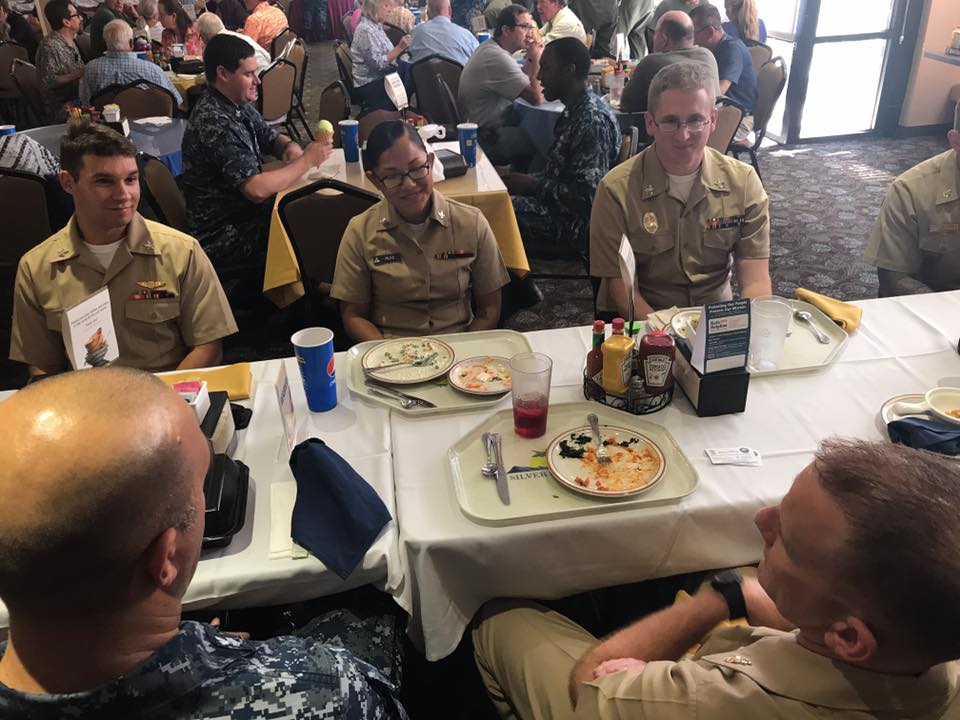
Giordano at Naval Air Station Fallon in July 2017.

Admiral John M. Richardson, the Chief of Naval Operations, announced the selection of Giordano as the 14th Master Chief Petty Officer of the Navy (MCPON) on 9 June 2016. He took charge from Michael D. Stevens on 2 September 2016 during a change of office ceremony at the Washington Navy Yard.

In 2016 MCPON Giordano in a widely supported and anticipated decision was key to the reversal of the decision to eliminate sailor ratings, a program that his predecessor initiated to modernize the Navy enlisted career paths. After speaking with thousands of sailors during their travels throughout the fleet, MCPON Giordano and the CNO Admiral John Richardson stated that “Our Navy needs to be a fast-learning organization”, and ultimately made the decision to bring back rating titles.

MCPON Giordano relinquished the office to Fleet Master Chief Russell Smith on 21 June 2018. He retired while the Navy Investigator General was investigating allegations that he created a toxic work environment while serving as MCPON. The investigation found that Giordano "failed to exhibit exemplary conduct" during his term as MCPON.

== Personal life ==
Giordano is married to Elka.

== Awards and decorations ==
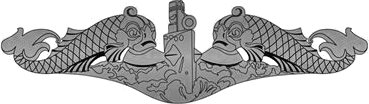
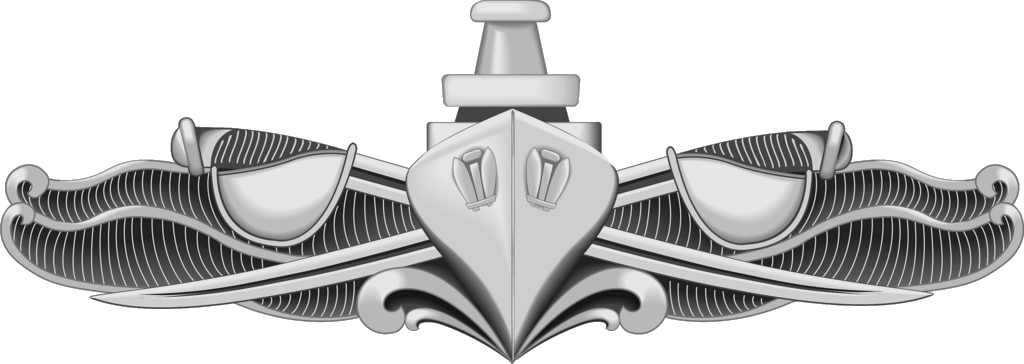
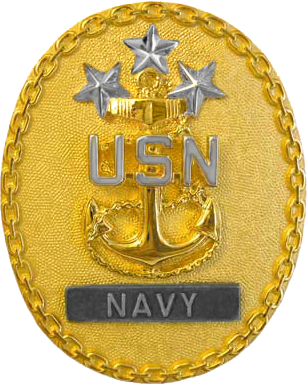
Enlisted Information Dominance Warfare Specialist insignia
Enlisted Submarine Warfare Specialist insignia [SG not SS]
Enlisted Surface Warfare Specialist insignia
Master Chief Petty Officer of the Navy Badge

Legion of Merit with two gold award stars
Meritorious Service Medal
Joint Service Commendation Medal
Navy and Marine Corps Commendation Medal with four gold award stars
Navy and Marine Corps Achievement Medal with one silver and one gold award stars
Joint Meritorious Unit Award with one bronze oak leaf cluster
Navy Unit Commendation
Navy Meritorious Unit Commendation with two bronze service stars
Coast Guard Meritorious Unit Commendation
Navy Good Conduct Medal with one silver and two bronze service stars
Navy Expeditionary Medal with service star
National Defense Service Medal with service star
Southwest Asia Service Medal with service star
Kosovo Campaign Medal with service star
Global War on Terrorism Expeditionary Medal
Global War on Terrorism Service Medal
Navy Sea Service Deployment Ribbon with one silver and one bronze service stars
Navy & Marine Corps Overseas Service Ribbon with three service stars
Special Operations Service Ribbon
NATO Medal for the former Yugoslavia
Kuwait Liberation Medal from Kuwait
Navy Pistol Marksmanship Ribbon

- 7 gold service stripes.

Military offices
Preceded by Michael D. Stevens	14th Master Chief Petty Officer of the Navy; September 2, 2016 – June 21, 2018	Succeeded by Russell L. Smith
