= Hey, Shipwreck =

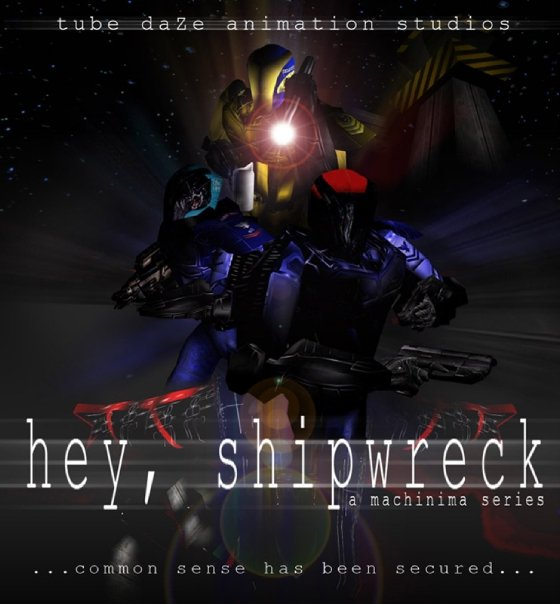
- Genres: Comic science fiction Military humor
- Running time: Six minutes per episode (average)
- Created by: Patrick Hrabe
- Release(s): March 22, 2007 – October 8, 2007 (Season one) April 13, 2008 – August 7, 2009 (Season two) TBA (Season three)
- Website http://www.tubedaze.com/

Hey, Shipwreck is a series of Machinima spoofing the Silent Service, that is serving aboard a United States Navy submarine. The animations are rendered using the Blender game engine, and can be watched in-browser in YouTube format, or downloaded in a variety of other formats. The title comes from the common Navy phrase: "Hey, Shipmate!" referring to a fellow sailor. Substituting "Shipwreck" makes it an insult. Similar to saying "Hey Dirtbag."

It is a divided issue amongst sailors about the inuendo of the term "shipmate" when addressing a fellow sailor. Some believe it can be derogatory, while others view it as a term of familial endearment.

== Description ==
The cartoons are set in the future in a fictional space navy, with the spaceships looking vaguely like submarines. The heroes, Thresher and Seawolf, are seen on the spaceship standing watch. Because of the boredom of standing watch, they spend their time complaining about such staples of navy life as ratings mergers (that is combining two dissimilar job specialties into a single job community). The cartoons imagine the natural successor to the Navy's current smoking cessation program by implementing a "swearing cessation program", with sailors' speech regulated by a computer. The heroes amuse themselves by creating ways to defeat the profanity filter. The heroes also combat such routine tasks as training new sailors (this is a spoof on how notoriously strict the training for new sailors is on submarines).

In an interview with Navy Times, the author of the cartoons, former ET1 Patrick Hrabe, admits the limited scope of his audience by saying: "the average viewers will not understand what's being talked about at all...[S]ubmariners and Navy guys who watch it get this thing." Patrick Hrabe says former Master Chief Petty Officer of the Navy Terry D. Scott wrote him and said he was "still laughing" after viewing the cartoons.
