= Michael D. Stevens =

13th Master Chief Petty Officer of the US Navy

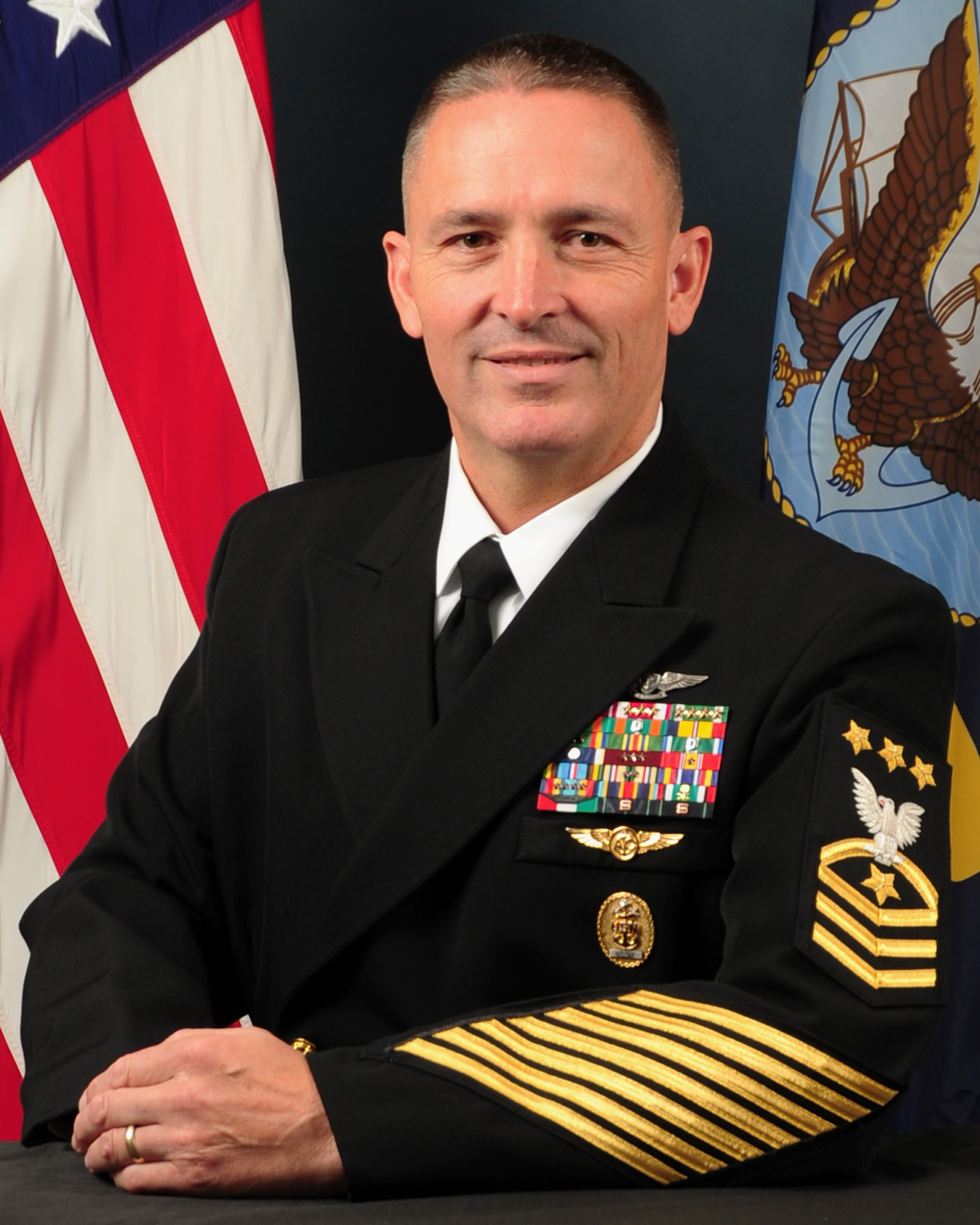
- Stevens in September 2012
- Born: Hamilton, Montana, U.S.
- Military career
- Allegiance: United States
- Branch: United States Navy
- Service years: 1983–2016
- Rank: Master Chief Petty Officer of the Navy
- Commands: Master Chief Petty Officer of the Navy
- Conflicts: Gulf War
- Awards: Navy Distinguished Service Medal; Legion of Merit; Meritorious Service Medal (4); Navy and Marine Corps Commendation Medal (5); Navy and Marine Corps Achievement Medal (6); Coast Guard Achievement Medal

Michael D. Stevens is a United States Navy sailor who served as Master Chief Petty Officer of the Navy (MCPON). He became the 13th MCPON on September 28, 2012, when he accepted the passing of the ceremonial cutlass from outgoing MCPON Rick D. West. He was succeeded by Steven S. Giordano on September 2, 2016.

== Early life and education ==
Stevens grew up in Montana. He graduated from Arlee High School in May 1983.

Stevens holds a Bachelor of Science degree from Excelsior College and has completed: Harvard University's John F. Kennedy School of Government "Leadership in Crisis"; Senior Enlisted Professional Military Education; Senior Enlisted Joint Professional Military Education; and the National Defense University Keystone course.

Stevens is an Honor Graduate and the recipient of the prestigious Peter Tomich Award for exceptional military excellence from the Senior Enlisted Academy.

== Naval career ==
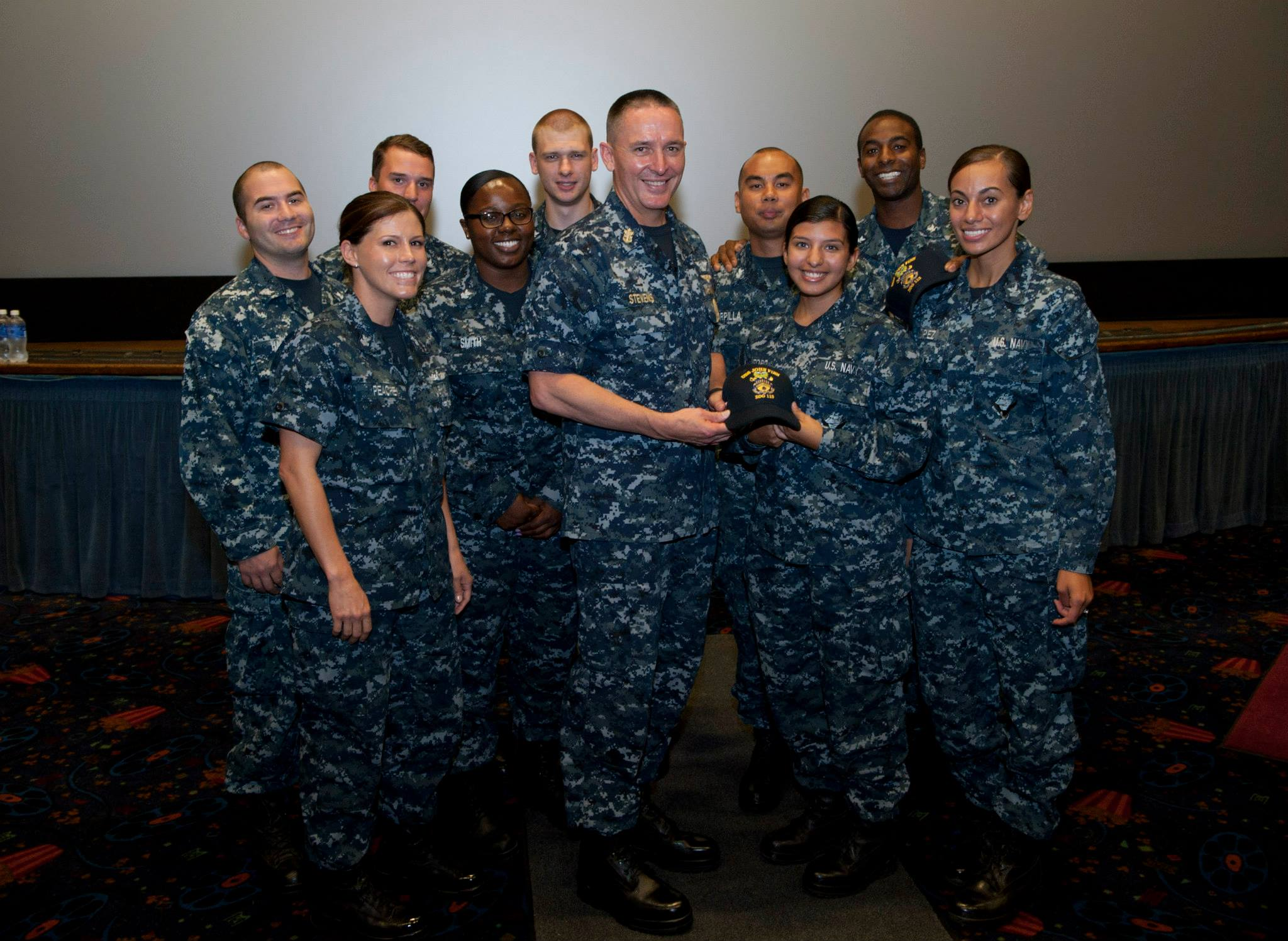
Sailors from USS John Finn (DDG-113) being visited by Stevens in September 2015.

Stevens shipped to Basic Training in San Diego, California in June 1983. He attended Aviation Structural Mechanic "A" School in Millington, Tennessee and his first duty assignment was VQ-2 Rota, Spain.

Stevens's other assignments have included: Navy Recruiting District (Minneapolis); HM-14 (Norfolk, Virginia); HM-18 (Norfolk, Virginia); Aviation Schools Command (Pensacola, Florida), HS-4 (San Diego); VC-8 Roosevelt Roads Naval Station (Ceiba, Puerto Rico); Naval Air Station (Pensacola); Helicopter Sea Combat Wing Atlantic and United States Second Fleet (both Norfolk, Virginia).

In October 2002, Stevens was advanced to master chief petty officer and assigned to VC-8, (Roosevelt Roads, Puerto Rico) as the Maintenance Master Chief and Command Master Chief. In October 2003, Stevens reported to Naval Air Station (Pensacola) and assumed the duties as the base Command Master Chief. In August 2006, Stevens reported to HM-14 as the Command Master Chief. After a brief but successful tour, in September 2007, he was selected by Commander, Helicopter Sea Combat Wing Atlantic to serve as the Wing Command Master Chief for the largest Helicopter Wing in the United States Navy.

In January 2009, Stevens was selected as the Command Master Chief for United States Second Fleet, and then in July 2010 as the 16th Fleet Master Chief for United States Fleet Forces Command, before being selected as the 13th Master Chief Petty Officer of the Navy in June 2012.

On March 16, 2016, Stevens announced that he would retire on September 2 after 33 years of naval service. The Chief of Naval Operations announced the selection of the 14th Master Chief Petty Officer of the Navy on June 9, 2016. Steven S. Giordano took charge from Stevens on 2 September 2016 during a change of office ceremony at the Washington Navy Yard.

== Post-navy career ==
Six days after his retirement, on September 8, 2016, Victory Media announced Stevens as its chief operating officer. In January 2018, Stevens was promoted to CEO of Viqtory, formerly Victory Media.

In January 2019, Stevens left Viqtory to become national executive director of the Navy League of the United States, a nonprofit military service organization that supports the United States Navy, Marine Corps, Coast Guard and Merchant Marine.

Military offices
Preceded by Rick West	13th Master Chief Petty Officer of the Navy; September 28, 2012 – September 2, 2016	Succeeded by Steven S. Giordano
