= Patrick Hrabe =

American artist

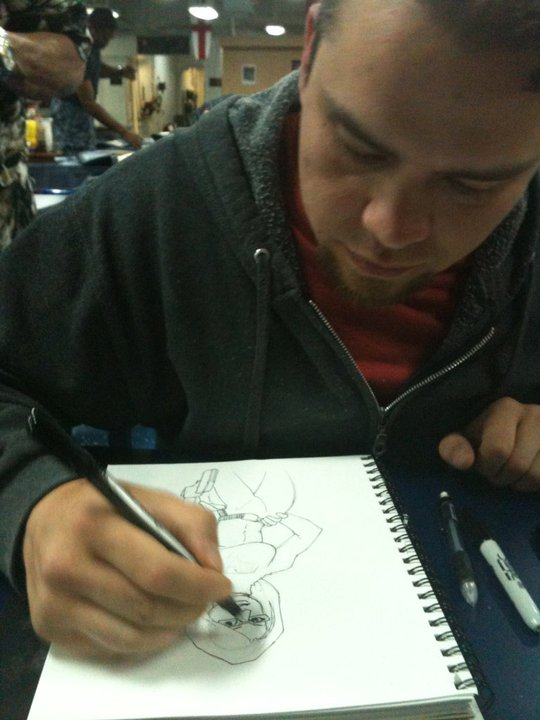
- Patrick Hrabe during the 2011 Naval Operational Stress Conference
- Born: April 25, 1980 (age 46)
- Occupations: Animator, Cartoonist, Illustrator, Freelancer
- Years active: 2006-present
- Employer: Tube Daze Productions
- Website: www.tubedaze.com

Patrick Hrabe (born April 25, 1980) is an independent artist in Redding, California and a former U.S. Navy Electronics Technician and submariner. He is the founder of Tube Daze Productions, a company that specializes in machinima, the art using engines from video games to create films. He is the creator of Hey, Shipwreck (a series about U.S. Navy submariners) and Join the Navy* (a comic about U.S. Navy recruiting). Patrick Hrabe was reported as a missing person on October 14, 2015, but has subsequently been found alive as of March 18, 2016.
