= Command Senior Enlisted Leader Identification Badges =

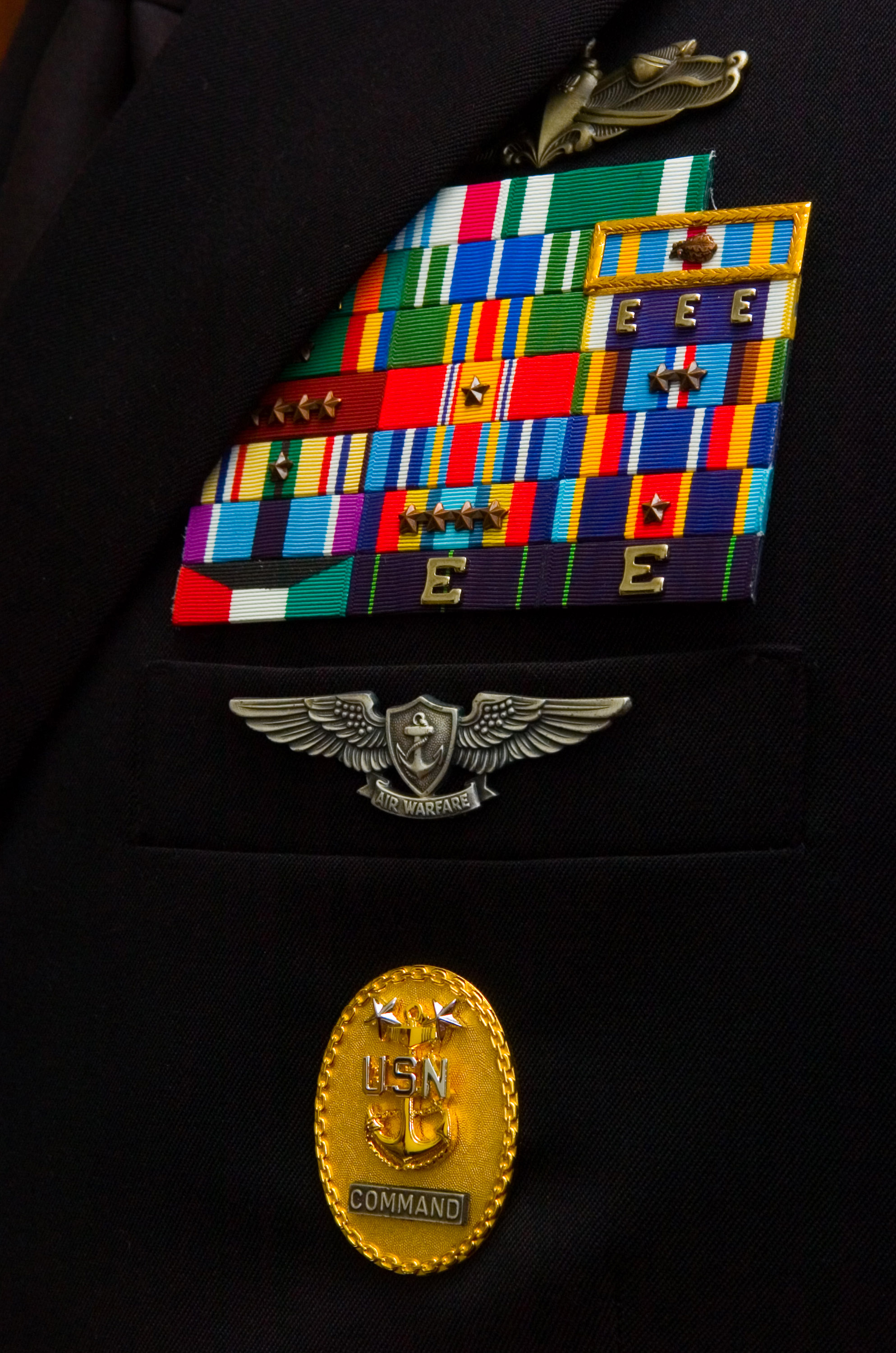
Ribbons and badges of a U.S. Navy Command Master Chief Petty Officer

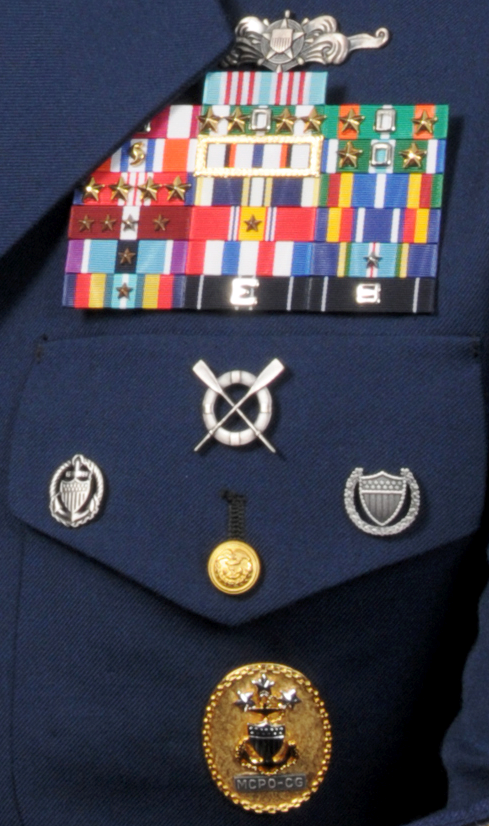
Ribbons and badges of former Master Chief Petty Officer of the Coast Guard Michael P. Leavitt

Command Senior Enlisted Leader Identification Badges are special United States Navy and United States Coast Guard badges which are issued to the most senior Chief Petty Officer or higher in a given U.S. Navy or U.S. Coast Guard command. The command may either be a shore or sea unit.

Command Senior Enlisted Leader Identification Badges are usually worn on the lower left pocket of a U.S. Navy and U.S. Coast Guard uniform, for male personnel, and above the right pocket and nametag for female personnel. On the U.S. Navy's NWU uniform, the badge is worn on the left pocket flap for both male and female personnel, the only such U.S. Navy uniform to do so.

U.S. Navy enlisted lead identifications are considered temporary badges only and are surrendered at the termination of the assignment for which they are held. U.S. Coast Guard enlisted leader identifications are permanent awards. However, if an enlisted leader is not currently filling a billet defined by the identification badge they have earned, the miniature version of the badge is worn on the right pocket of the U.S. Coast Guard uniform.

== United States Navy ==
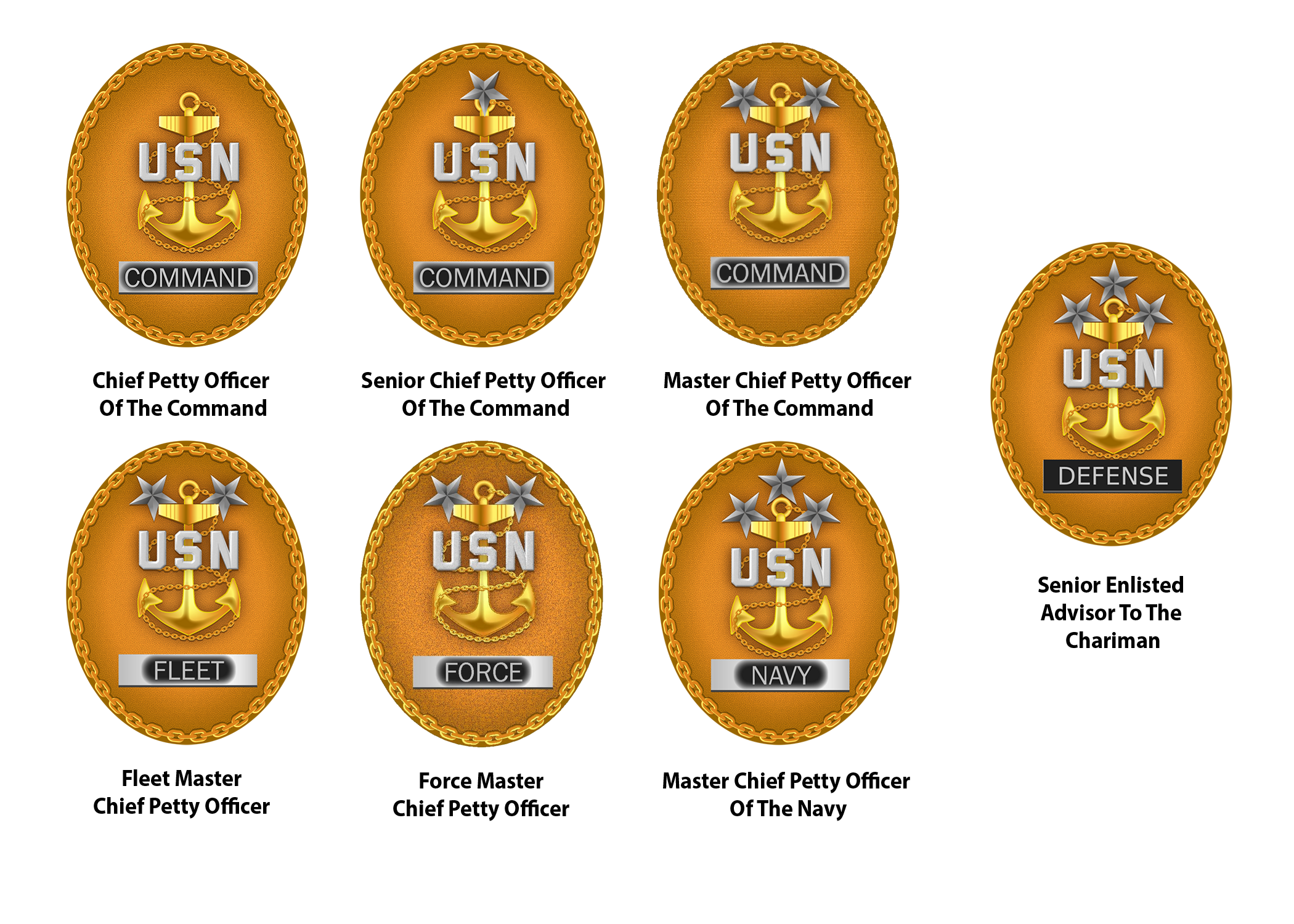
Command Senior Enlisted Leader Identification Badges

The appearance of the Command Senior Enlisted Leader Identification Badge is determined by the rank of its holder and the level of the command in which they serve. At the single command level, the badge is issued with word “Command” on its face with a Chief Petty Officer (CPO) anchor showing the fouled anchor insignia of the bearer. CPOs display the anchor, Senior Chief Petty Officers the anchor with star and Master Chief Petty Officers the anchor with two stars.

At higher Navy commands, the designation of “Fleet” and “Force” is displayed instead of “Command” indicating the senior enlisted member of an entire Navy fleet or task force. Holders of this badge are always Command Master Chief Petty Officers.

The highest Command Senior Enlisted Leader Identification Badge of all is the Master Chief Petty Officer of the Navy badge held solely by the Master Chief Petty Officer of the Navy.

== United States Coast Guard ==
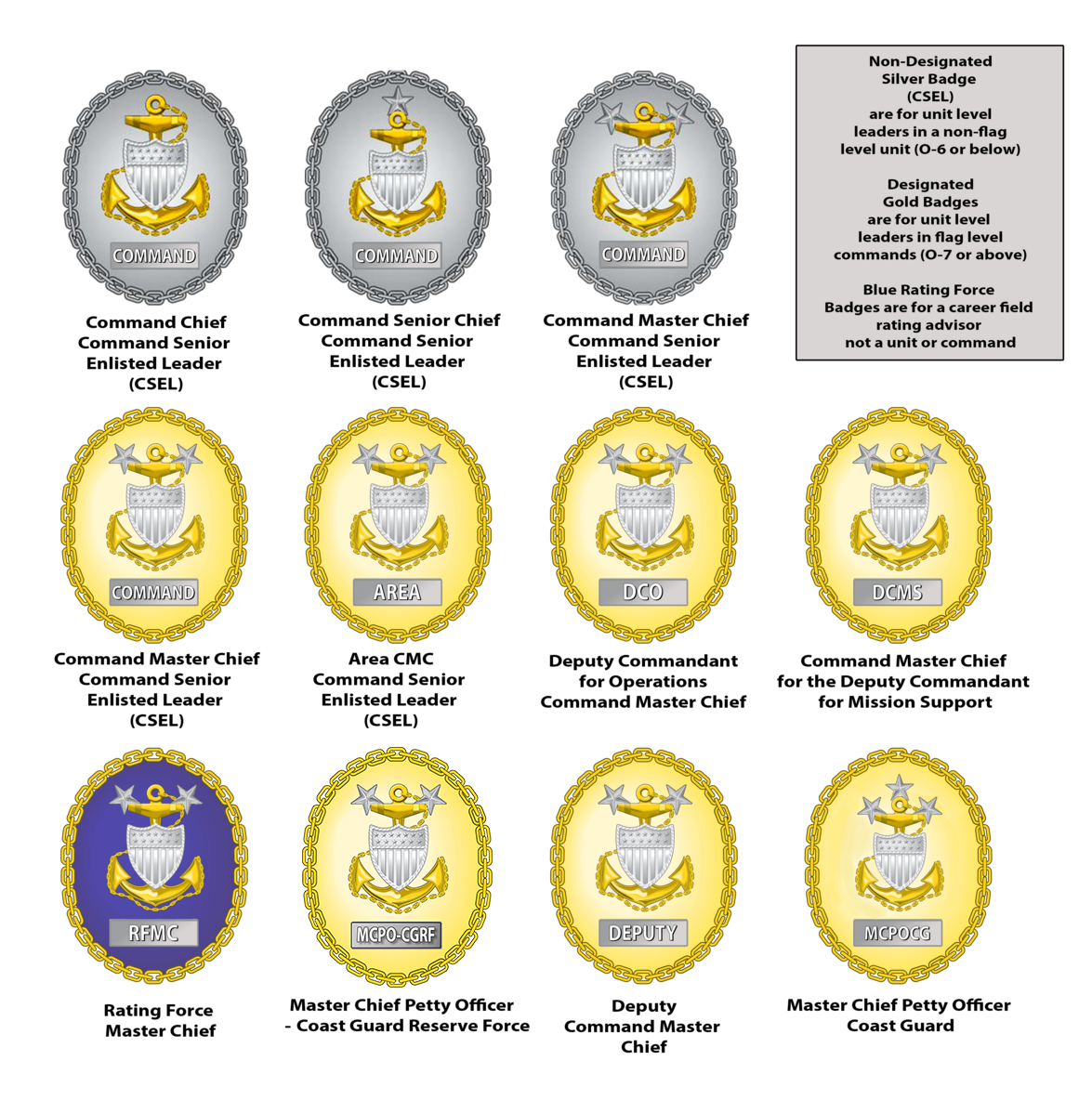
Coast Guard Command Senior Enlisted Leader Identification Badges

Just like the U.S. Navy, the appearance of the U.S. Coast Guard's Command Senior Enlisted Leader Identification Badge is determined by the rank of its holder and the level of the command in which they serve. With the exception of the Rating Force Master Chief Identification Badge, the U.S. Coast Guard has two general categories of enlisted leader badges which can be distinguished by their metallic color, silver or gold.

Silver Command Senior Enlisted Leader Identification Badges represent non-designated command positions while gold Command Senior Enlisted Leader Identification Badges are commandant-designated command positions. Non-designated command badges can be found at the unit and command level at pay grades E-7 through E-9. The higher commands are always commandant-designated command positions at the Command, Area, Rating Force, and U.S. Coast Guard level. All commandant-designated command positions are at the Command Master Chief Petty Officer (E-9) pay grade.

Prior to the release of the U.S. Coast Guard's March 2012 (M1020.6G) and August 2018 (M1020.6J) uniform regulations, the Coast Guard awarded/issued non-designated sector Command Senior Enlisted Leader Identification Badges to the senior most senior enlisted leader of a U.S. Coast Guard sector and unit level. Due to the removal of these badges from the uniform regulations, it is assumed that the sector and unit Command Senior Enlisted Leader Identification Badges are no longer awarded/issued but may still be worn by those that have previously earned the badge.

== See also ==
- Coast Guard command enlisted identification badge
- Senior enlisted advisor
- Badges of the United States Navy
- Badges of the United States Coast Guard
- Identification badges of the uniformed services of the United States
- Obsolete badges of the United States military
