= Basic Enlisted Submarine School =

United States Navy's school for enlisted submariners

- Type: United States Navy Training Command
- Established: 1916
- Location: Groton, New London County, Connecticut, USA
- Campus: Naval Submarine Base New London
- Website: Basic Enlisted Submarine School

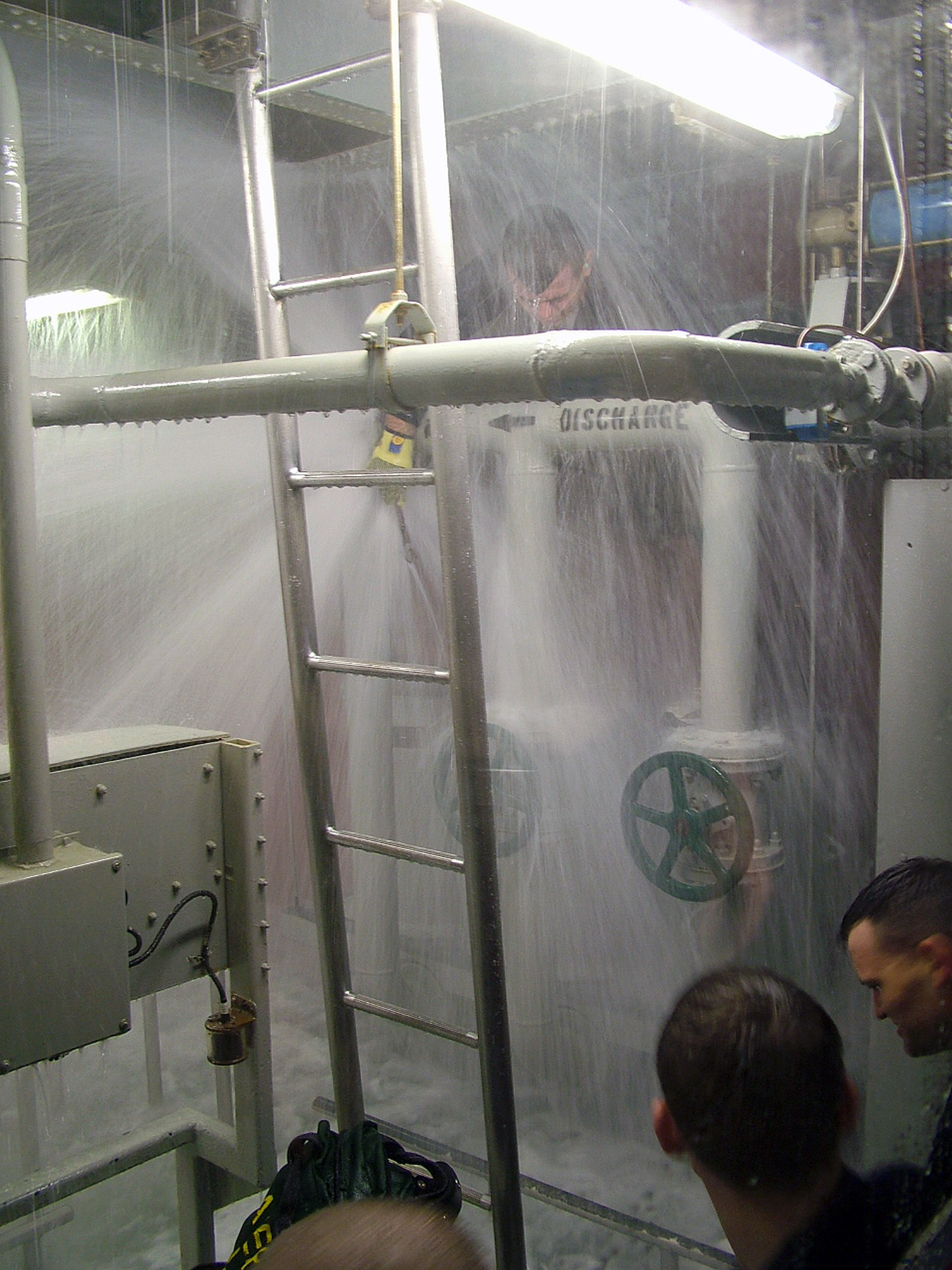
A student at Basic Enlisted Submarine School (BESS), repairs a simulated engine room leak in the school's damage control wet trainer at Naval Submarine Base New London.

Basic Enlisted Submarine School (BESS) is the U.S. Navy's submarine training school for enlisted sailors. Located on Naval Submarine Base New London (NAVSUBASE NLON) in Groton, New London County, Connecticut, the school is an eight-week introduction to the basic theory, construction and operation of nuclear-powered submarines. The course includes instruction on shipboard organization, submarine safety and escape procedures. This program requires passing a physical and mental screening. As of 2015, BESS is open to female sailors, including current sailors who wish to join the submarine force by completing the two-month program.

== High Risk Trainers ==
The Navy operates three high risk trainers at New London that sub school classes attend in random order. They are:

- Fire Fighting - Students are instructed in the differences between submarine and surface ship fire fighting and the special equipment used in sub-surface fire fighting.
- Damage Control - Sailors are required to patch leaks and seal ruptured pipes before their compartment completely floods.
- Submarine Escape - Personnel learn how to successfully escape from a disabled submarine in 40 feet of water via a realistic trainer.
