= Chief of the boat =

Enlisted sailor on board a U.S. Navy submarine

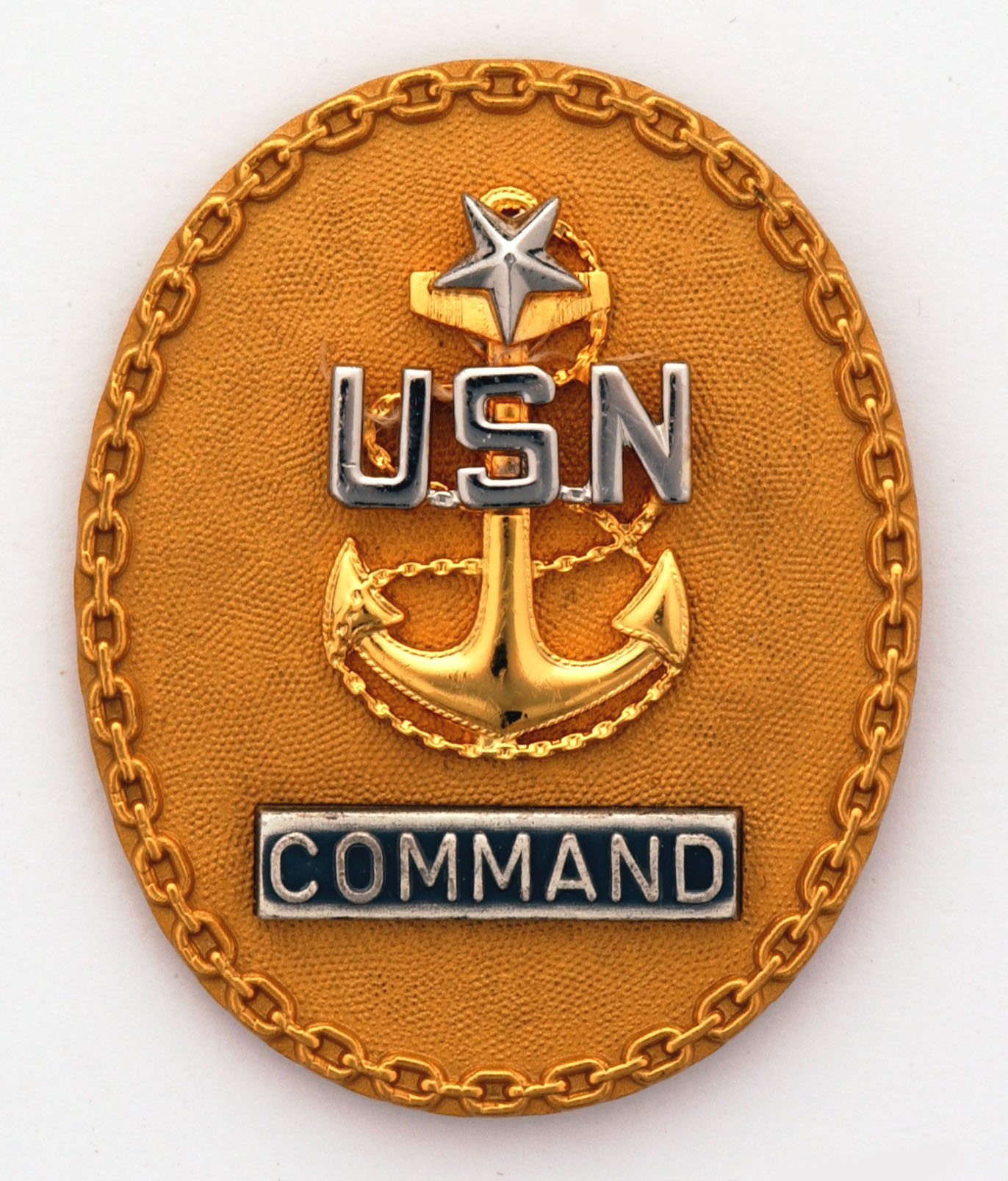
Command senior chief badge

The chief of the boat (COB) is an enlisted sailor on board a United States Navy submarine who serves as the senior enlisted advisor to the commanding officer.

== Overview ==
The chief of the boat holds the rank of senior chief petty officer (E-8) or master chief petty officer (E-9), and is the equivalent of a command master chief petty officer (CMDCM) or command senior chief petty officer (CMDCS) in shore and surface commands. The COB assists with matters regarding the good order and discipline of the crew, working closely with the ship's officers, as well as being the primary advocate for enlisted personnel.

Among the COB's most important duties is serving as qualification officer for the submarine qualification program, monitoring the conduct and performance of all onboard enlisted personnel. Other duties include assigning bunks, assigning cleaning and mess details, and aiding the executive officer in maintaining the Watch, Quarter, and Station bill. The COB is also responsible for the ship's cleanliness and proper stowage of safety equipment, as well as monitoring leave and liberty.

== See also ==
- Fleet Master Chief Petty Officer (FLTCM)
- Force Master Chief Petty Officer (FORCM)
