= Command master chief petty officer =

Enlisted rating

(United States) Command Master Chief Petty Officer
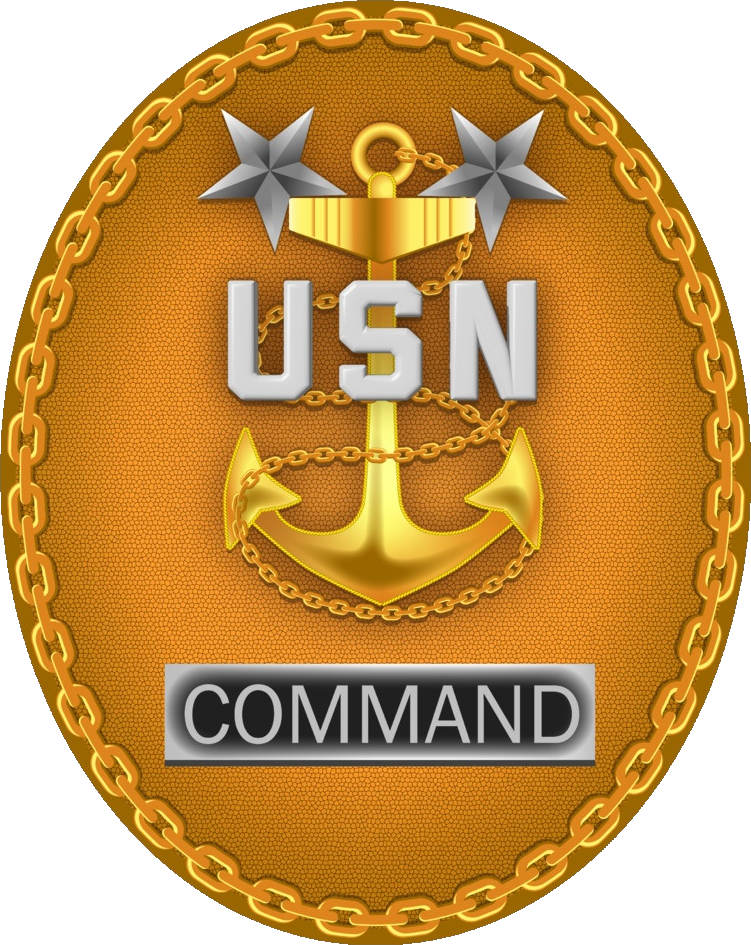
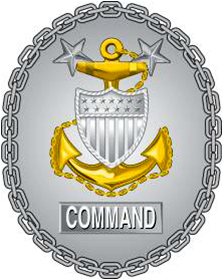
- Navy CMDCM / USCG Silver Badge CMC

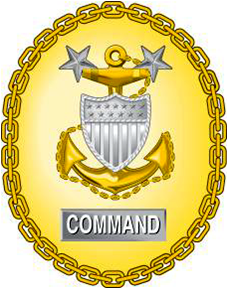
- USCG Gold Badge CMC

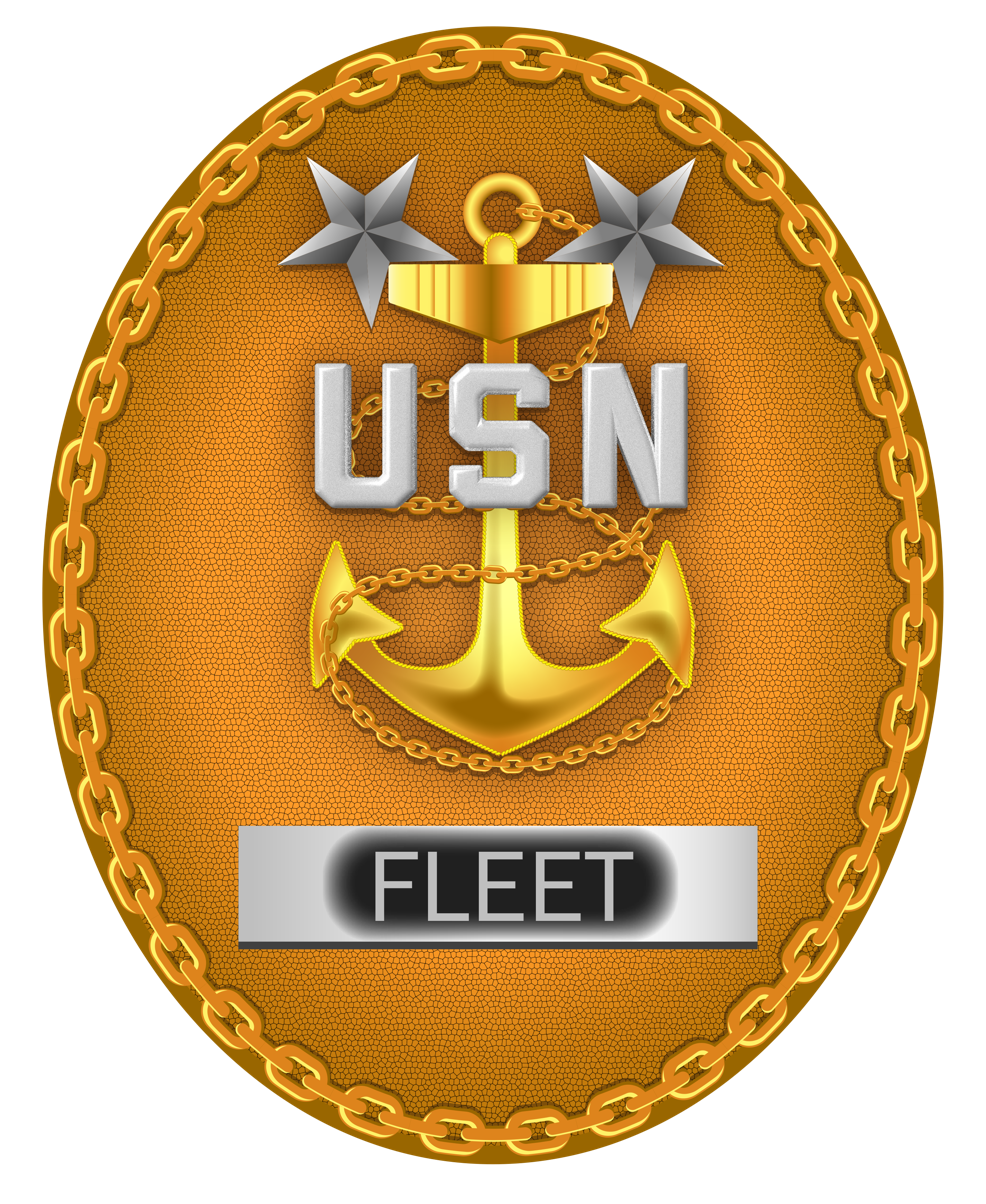
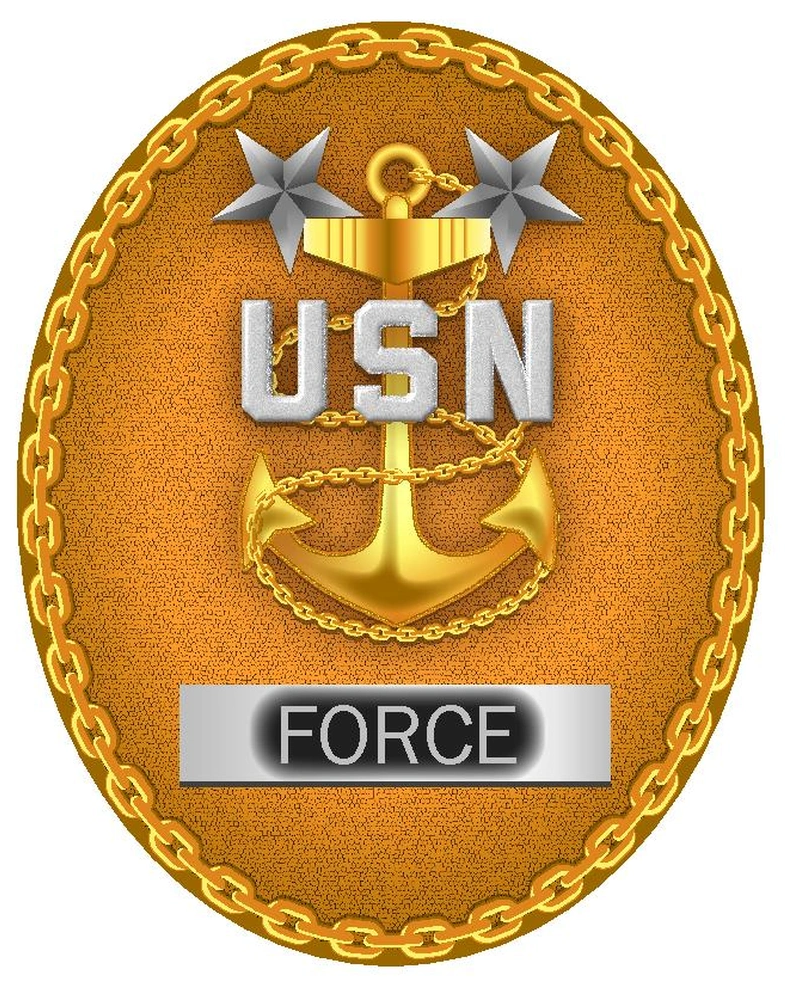
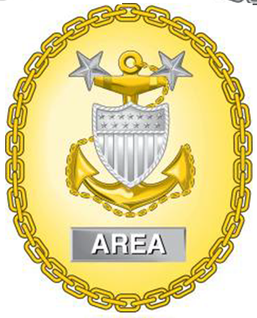
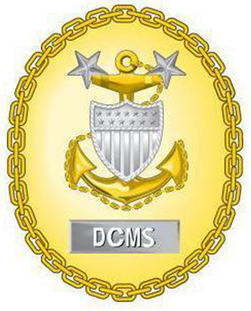
- Navy Fleet / Force MCPO USCG Area level Gold Badge CMC
- Country: United States
- Service branch: United States Navy; United States Coast Guard
- Abbreviation: CMDCM / CMC
- Rank group: non-commissioned officer
- NATO rank code: OR-9
- Pay grade: E-9
- Next higher rank: Master Chief Petty Officer of the Navy; Master Chief Petty Officer of the Coast Guard
- Next lower rank: Master chief petty officer

Command master chief petty officer (CMDCM) is an enlisted rating in the United States Navy and U.S. Coast Guard, as well as a billet in the Japan Maritime Self-Defense Force.

In the U.S. Navy, the command master chief petty officer is the senior enlisted advisor at a command and as such works as a liaison between the commanding officer and the enlisted ranks, serving as the senior enlisted leader. In this capacity, the CMDCM assists the commanding officer in issues of quality of life, discipline, training, and morale. Collectively, the CMDCM, commanding officer, and executive officer are referred to as the "big three".

In the U.S. Coast Guard this title named as Command Master Chief (CMC).

== Japan Maritime Self-Defense Force ==
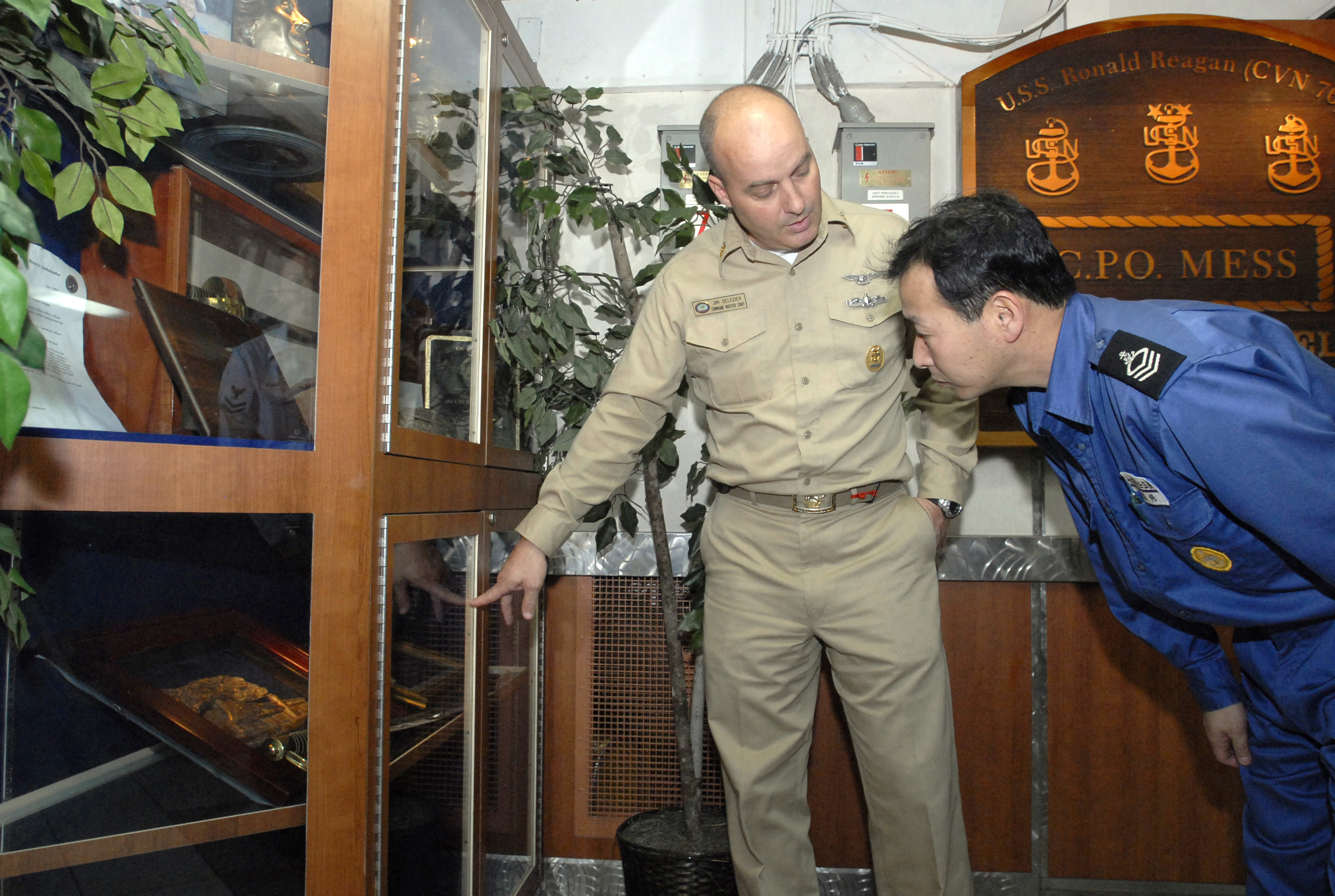
A U.S. command master chief in 2007 gives a tour of USS Ronald Reagan to a Japanese command master chief.

Japan's navy, the Japanese Maritime Self-Defense Force (JMSDF), first established their command master chief petty officer program in 2003, modeling it on that of the U.S. Navy's. Unlike the U.S. Navy, the JMSDF treats it as a billet, not a separate rank.

== United States ==
=== United States Navy ===
A command master chief petty officer is the most senior enlisted sailor in a United States Navy unit. They advise their respective commander or Commanding Officer, and provide input in the formulation, implementation, and execution of policies concerning morale, welfare, job satisfaction, discipline, utilization, family support, and training of enlisted sailors, as well as providing input and advice in matters affecting mission and operations as required. In smaller units, this position may be filled by a command senior chief petty officer (CMDCS), a command chief petty officer (CMDC), or a master chief petty officer who is not yet a command master chief. The rates force master chief petty officer (FORCM) and fleet master chief petty officer (FLTCM) are used for larger units such as U.S. Fleet Forces Command, Navy Expeditionary Combat Command, U.S. Pacific Fleet, and Submarine Force U.S. Atlantic Fleet. There are only four FLTCMs and 16 FORCMs in the U.S. Navy.

==== Background ====
OPNAVINST 1306.2G. Command Master Chief Program (April 2012)

First referenced in OPNAVINST 1306.2C dated 16 October 1995 (now 1306.2J), the Navy states that its command master chief program is ostensibly intended to stimulate free-flowing communications, and ensure the highest standards of professionalism are upheld at all levels within the chain of command. Command master chiefs strengthen the chain of command by keeping the commanding officer aware of existing or potential situations as well as procedures and practices which affect the mission, readiness, welfare and morale of the sailors in the command. CMDCMs are the senior enlisted leaders who report directly to the officer commanding the unit for which they are the CMDCM. They formulate and implement policies concerning morale, welfare, job satisfaction, discipline, utilization and training of navy personnel. By reporting directly to their commanding officer, the CMDCMs keep their chain of command aware and informed of sensitive and current issues.

The Bureau of Personnel assigns a CMDCM to commands with 250 or more enlisted manpower. All carrier-based air wing squadrons, deployable helicopter anti-submarine warfare light, helicopter combat support, and maritime patrol squadrons will have a CMDCM requirement regardless of size due to the complexity of their operations. Those commands that do not have enlisted manpower of 250 assign a CMDCM from within command resources on a collateral duty basis. In the absence of a master chief petty officer, a senior chief petty officer or chief petty officer may be assigned, such as with the Oliver Hazard Perry-class frigates, which sometimes had the former during their lifespan with the U.S. Navy.

In 2015, the U.S. Navy formally established the rating of command senior chief petty officer (CMDCS), whereas previously it had been a billet.

==== Submarines ====
The equivalent of a command master chief on U.S. Navy submarines is known as the "chief of the boat," or "COB". The COB has similar duties to that of a command master chief in a surface, aviation, or shore unit.

==== Insignia ====
The rank insignia of a command master chief petty officer consists of two silver stars, one perched eagle, one silver star taking the place of rating insignia, and one rocker above three chevrons.

U.S. Navy CMDCM insignia

Supra-12 year service dress blue sleeve insignia

Collar garrison insignia

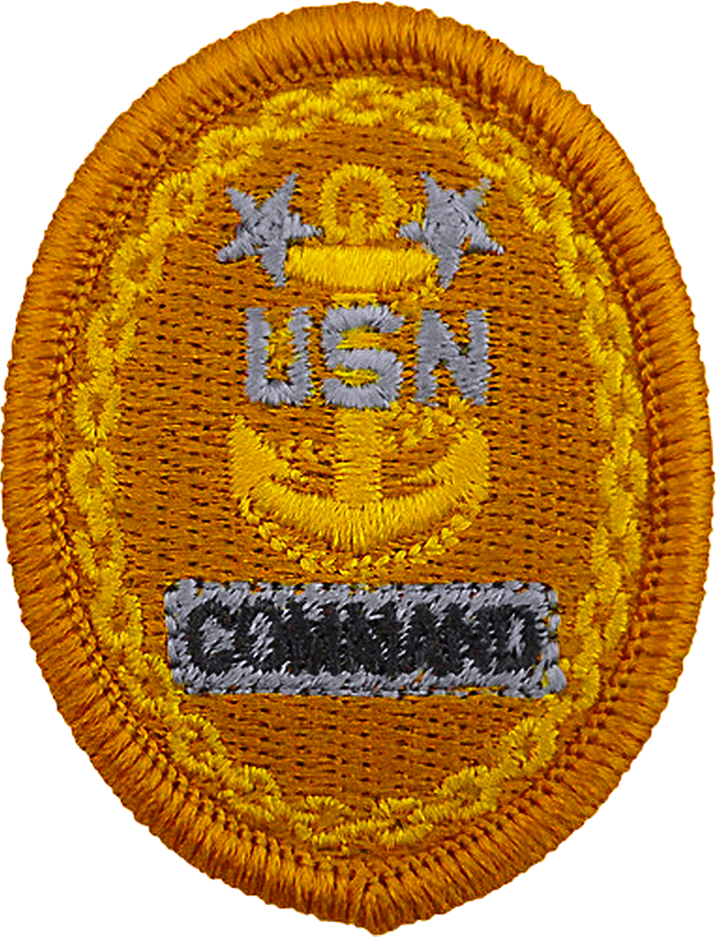
Coveralls badge

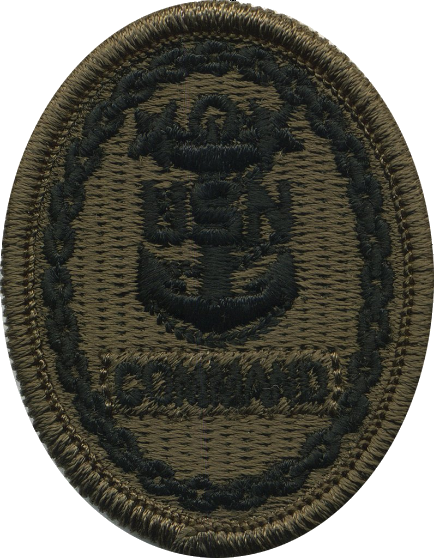
NWU Type III badge

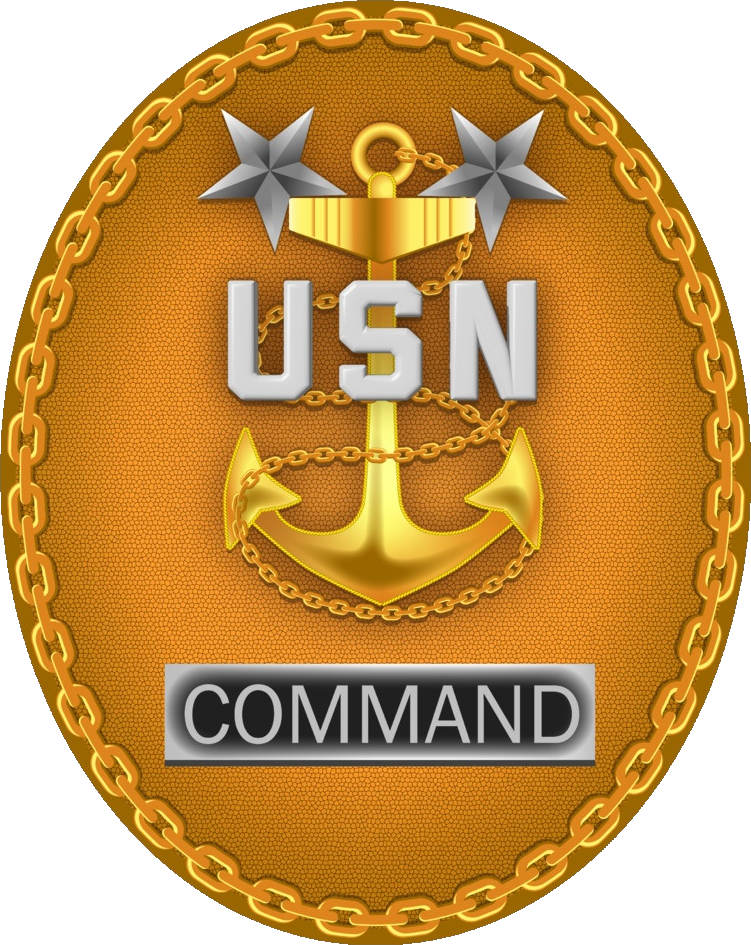
Service khakis and flame-resistant coveralls badge

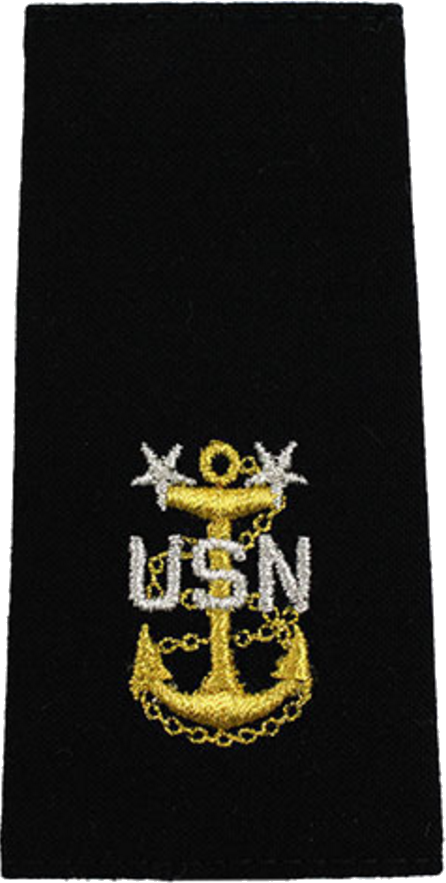
Shoulderboard

=== United States Coast Guard ===
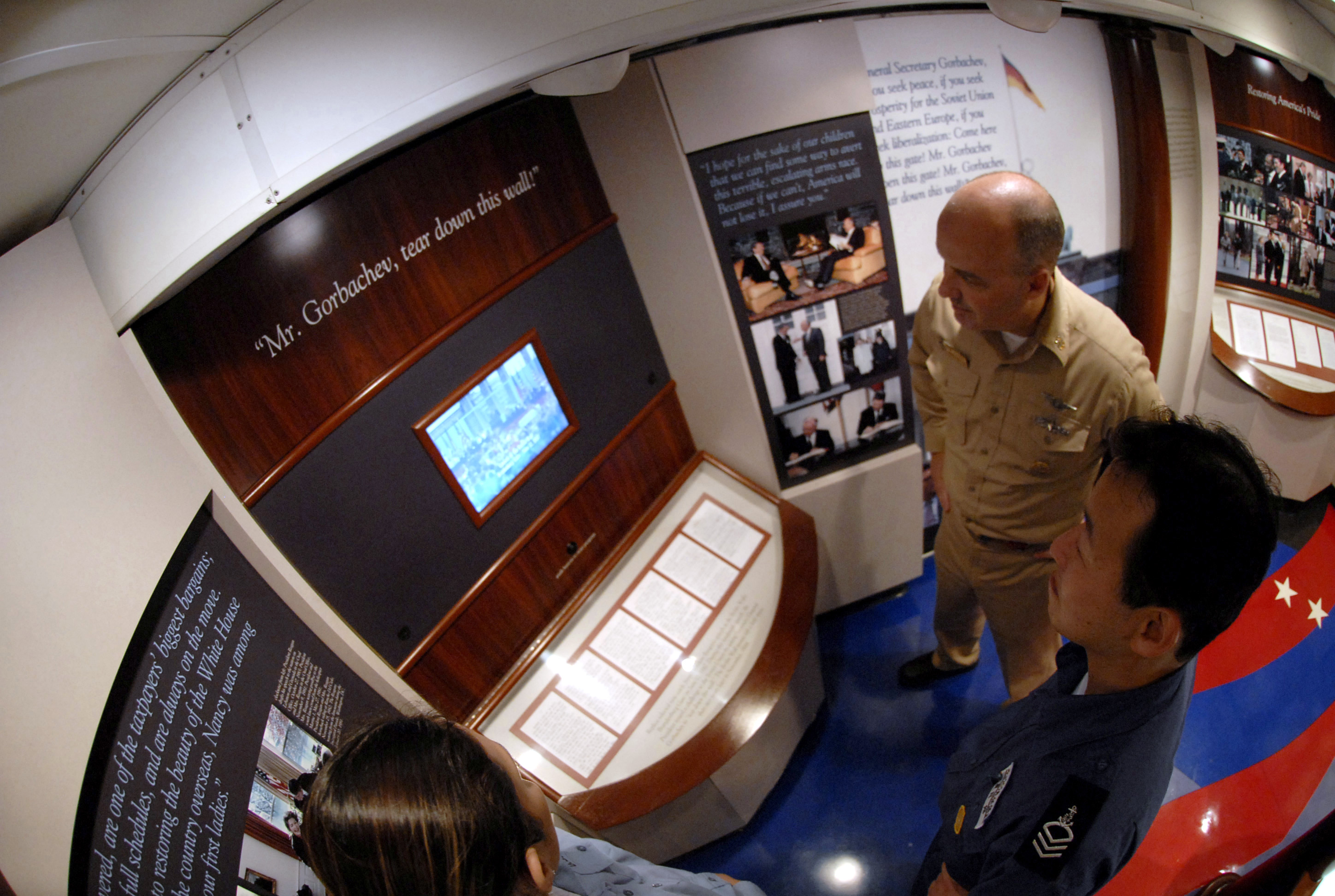
A U.S. command master chief in 2007 gives a tour of USS Ronald Reagan to a Japanese command master chief. Both the Japanese and U.S. navies have command master chiefs, with Japan basing theirs on those of the United States.

Like the U.S. Navy, the United States Coast Guard also utilizes the title and designation of command master chief. These individuals are also informally referred to as "gold badge" due to the insignia they wear. Command master chiefs can be so designated either by the Commandant of the Coast Guard or the Master Chief Petty Officer of the Coast Guard. One commandant-designated CMC is located at each area, each district, both maintenance and logistics commands, headquarters, the Coast Guard Academy, and the Deployable Operations Group. One commandant-designated reserve command master chief is located at each area, each district, both maintenance and logistics commands. One Master Chief Petty Officer of the Coast Guard-designated CMC is located at each training center, Coast Guard recruiting command, and the Personnel Service Center.

==== Insignia ====
The Gold Badge CMC rate insignia based on the Master Chief Petty Officer rate insignia and consists of two silver stars, one perched eagle, one silver shield taking the place of rating insignia, and one rocker above three chevrons. The Area level Gold Badge CMC rate insignia have two gold stars and one gold shield instead of silver stars and silver shield. Silver Badge CMC not have special rate insignia.

U.S. Coast Guard Command Master Chief (CMC) insignias

Master Chief Petty Officer collar and cap device

Master Chief Petty Officer sleeve insignia

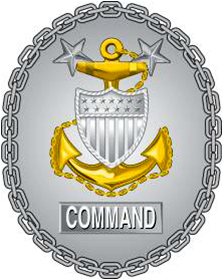
Non-designated Command Senior Enlisted Leader Identification Badges

Gold Badge CMC sleeve insignia

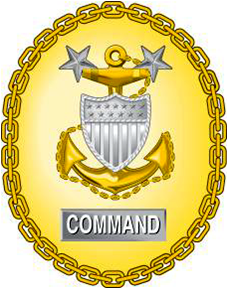
Designated Command Senior Enlisted Leader Identification Badges

Area level Gold Badge CMC sleeve insignia

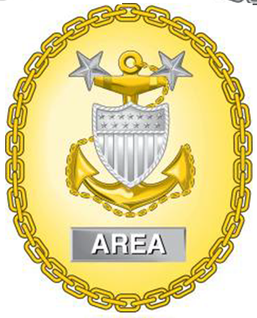
Command Senior Enlisted Leader Identification Badge of an Area Command Master Chief

== In popular culture ==
- In the 2014 TV series The Last Ship, the character Russell Jeter (portrayed by Charles Parnell) is the command master chief aboard the USS Nathan James and holds the rank of command master chief petty officer.

== See also ==
- CPO command identification badge
- Master chief petty officer
- Senior chief petty officer
- Chief of the boat
