= United States Navy Senior Enlisted Academy =

United States Navy school

The United States Navy Senior Enlisted Academy provides education and training for senior and master chief petty officers. Most of the students are active-duty U.S. Navy personnel. The remaining students are from the Navy Reserve, Air Force, Army, Coast Guard, Marine Corps, and other nations' armed forces.

== History ==
Congress established the senior and master chief petty officer ranks in 1958, primarily as an incentive to retain E-7s beyond their 20-year mark. This move enjoyed some initial success. Although the chief petty officer has always held a well-defined position of responsibility in the chain of command, the roles of the senior and master chief petty officers have been the subject of considerable debate almost since their beginning days. It became apparent that senior and master chief petty officers received little additional responsibilities than what they had as chief petty officers. This resulted in a return of the trend where many senior enlisted members left the Navy shortly after completing 20 years of service.

In 1979, the Chief of Naval Operations took concrete steps to end that debate and stated that the Navy would expand the role of the senior and master chief petty officers. Their roles would no longer be that of senior technicians; instead, their role would be that of middle management. As a result of the CNO's policy, commands throughout the Navy appointed many senior and master chief petty officers to positions of greater responsibility. While some performed well in their expanded roles, others lacked the education and training needed to carry out their new managerial duties. To assist senior and master chief petty officers' transition from technicians to positions of middle managers, the Navy founded the Senior Enlisted Academy.

Opening ceremonies were held on September 14, 1981, and the Senior Enlisted Academy opened its doors to its first class. This pilot class, consisting of 16 students, received and validated the nine-week curriculum containing a diverse mix of subjects such as communications skills, national security affairs, Navy programs, and physical readiness training. Starting January 2005, the SEA seated 65 students per class and convened for six weeks.

Because of the SEA's success in preparing senior enlisted personnel for positions of greater responsibilities, graduation is now a requirement before assuming the positions of command master chief or chief of the boat.

The Senior Enlisted Academy offers resident and blended classes. The resident class is six weeks long. The blended class is six weeks online and two weeks in residence. There have been 136 resident and 19 blended classes as of February 24, 2007.

== Facilities ==
The Senior Enlisted Academy began conducting its classes in facilities at the Center for War Gaming, Naval War College in Newport, Rhode Island in 1981. In August 1989, the Academy moved to its new facilities in Tomich Hall. This building contains the classrooms, office spaces, and berthing for 61 students. Tomich Hall pays tribute to Chief Watertender Peter Tomich who earned the Medal of Honor for his actions on USS Utah on 7 December 1941 at Pearl Harbor, Hawaii.
