= List of people who died in traffic collisions =

This list contains notable people who have been killed in traffic collisions. This list does not include those who were killed competing on closed-road events whether in motorsport or in competitive cycling events. Passengers of a vehicle are indicated in parentheses on the "mode of transport" field.

== A ==
Name	Born	Died	Aged	Nationality	Notability	Mode of transport	Vehicle	Location	Details
Magomed Abdulaev	1961	2023	61 years	Russian	lawyer and politician	pedestrian		Makhachkala, Russia	Abdulaev was hit by a car and killed while crossing the street outside the crosswalk.
Norifumi Abe	1975	2007	32 years	Japanese	motorcycle racer	scooter	Yamaha XP 500 TMAX	Kawasaki, Kanagawa, Japan	Collision with a truck, which made an illegal U-turn in front of him, when he was riding his motorcycle.
Anand Abhyankar	1965	2012	47 years	Indian	actor	car	Suzuki Wagon R	Pune, Maharashtra, India	Abhyankar was hit head on by a vehicle on the Mumbai–Pune Expressway. His co-star Akshay Pendse and two-year-old son were also killed in the crash
Danielle Adams	1982	2021	39 years	Canadian	politician	car		Thompson, Manitoba, Canada	Adams was driving on Manitoba Highway 6 when her SUV collided with a semi-truck
Frank Adams	1930	1989	58 years	British	mathematician	car		Brampton, Cambridgeshire, England, United Kingdom	
Olubayo Adefemi	1985	2011	25 years	Nigerian	footballer	car		Kavala, Greece	Adefemi was driving on Egnatia Odos when he collided with another vehicle.
Adegoke Adelabu	1915	1958	42 years	Nigerian	politician	car		Lagos–Ibadan Expressway, Nigeria	
Nick Adenhart	1986	2009	22 years	American	baseball pitcher	car	Mitsubishi Eclipse	Fullerton, California, US	A drunk driver ran a red light and hit the car in which Adenhart was a passenger, driving it into a light pole.
Adrian Adonis	1953	1988	34 years	American	professional wrestler	minivan		Lewisporte, Newfoundland, Canada	Two other passengers in the vehicle in which he was riding – professional wrestlers Pat Kelly (Victor Arko) and Dave McKigney – died in the same crash, caused when the car struck a moose on a highway and spun into a tree at over 80 km/h (50 mph).
Emmanuel Kwasi Afranie	1943	2016	73 years	Ghanaian	football coach	car		Suhum, Ghana	
Simonluca Agazzone	1981	2020	39 years	Italian	footballer	car		Carpignano Sesia, Italy	
Bruno Agostinelli	1987	2016	28 years	Canadian	tennis player	motorcycle		Toronto, Ontario, Canada	Agostinelli lost control of his motorcycle and collided with a car.
Ipče Ahmedovski	1966	1994	28 years	Macedonian	singer	car	Mercedes-Benz A124	Šopići, Yugoslavia	Ahmedovski died in 1994 on Ibarska magistrala near Šopići, crashing his speeding Mercedes into a truck.
Carl Albert	1962	1995	32 years	American	musician for Vicious Rumors	car			
Martin Aldridge	1974	2000	25 years	British	footballer	car	Peugeot	A45, England, United Kingdom	After being an unused substitute in a game for Rushden & Diamonds, he was travelling home toward Northampton on the westbound A45 road after the game when he collided with a BMW travelling in the opposite direction.
Ben Alexander	1971	1992	20 years	Australian	rugby league player	car		Colyton, New South Wales, Australia	He was driving while intoxicated.
Alexandra	1942	1969	27 years	German	singer	car	Mercedes-Benz W128	Tellingstedt, Germany	While going on a holiday, Alexandra collided with a truck and was killed instantly whereas her son, one of the two passengers, survived with minor injuries and Alexandra's mother, the other passenger, died at the hospital.
Steve Allen	1921	2000	78 years	American	actor, songwriter, author	car		Encino, California, US	Died from a heart attack that was found to have resulted from a condition known as pericardial effusion. The crash caused a blood vessel in his chest to leak blood into the sac surrounding his heart. His death occurred several hours after the crash, from which he suffered no immediate apparent injuries.
Duane Allman	1946	1971	24 years	American	guitarist for the Allman Brothers Band	motorcycle	Harley-Davidson Sportster	Macon, Georgia, US	Allman lost control of his motorcycle when he tried to avoid an oncoming truck that unexpectedly stopped in the middle of an intersection while turning left in front of him. He was thrown from the motorcycle, which landed on him and skidded with him under it, resulting in fatal internal injuries.
Yasser Al-Masri	1970	2018	47 years	Jordanian	actor	car		Zarqa, Jordan	Al–Masri descended a slope leading a bus in his car, lost control, and crashed, dying on the spot.
Mahmadu Alphajor Bah	1977	2016	39 years	Sierra Leonean	footballer	car		Freetown, Sierra Leone	He collided with an oncoming truck.
Andrei Amalrik	1938	1980	42 years	Russian	writer	car		near Guadalajara, Spain	Amalrik swerved out of his lane on a wet road and hit an oncoming truck. A piece of metal, most likely from the steering column, embedded in his throat, instantly killing him. His wife and the two other passengers in the car suffered only minor injuries.
Fariyar Aminipour	2000	2024	23 years	Iranian	muay thai fighter	motorbike		Phuket, Thailand	Lost control and hit a curb in a Thai tunnel.
John Anderson	1944	1986	42 years	American	race car driver	car		near Charlotte, North Carolina, US	Crash occurred on Interstate 85.
Eric Andolsek	1966	1992	25 years	American	football player	stationary		Thibodaux, Louisiana, US	Andolsek was working in the front yard of his home when a semi-trailer truck ran off the highway and hit him.
Jen Angel	1975	2023	48 years	American	writer	pedestrian		Oakland, California, US	She was robbed in a bank parking lot and fatally injured by the fleeing vehicle.
Vanessa Angel	1993	2021	27 years	Indonesian	actress, model, and singer	car (passenger)	Mitsubishi Pajero Sport	Jombang, East Java, Indonesia	Angel was in a SUV travelling on Nganjuk-Surabaya Toll Road with four others: her husband, their toddler, the toddler's nanny, and the driver. The driver was reportedly drowsy and lost control, slamming into the concrete divider on the side of the toll road. Angel and her husband died at the scene. Siska Lorensa, the nanny, sustained serious injuries. The driver, Tubagus Joddy, and Angel's son suffered minor injuries.
Theo Angelopoulos	1935	2012	76 years	Greek	film director	pedestrian		Drapetsona, Greece	He was hit by a motorcycle driven by an off-duty police officer while crossing a busy road. Hospitalized, he was treated in an intensive care unit, dying from his injuries several hours later.
Jack Anglin	1916	1963	46 years	American	country music singer; one half of the duo Johnnie & Jack	car		Madison, Tennessee, US	Died in crash en route to funeral of Patsy Cline.
Álex Angulo	1953	2014	61 years	Spanish	actor	car		Fuenmayor, La Rioja, Spain	
Rob Anker		2017	27 years	British	dancer (member of Diversity)	car	Chevy Cobalt	Canada	
Jackson Anthony	1958	2023	65 years	Sri Lankan	actor and film director	car		Sri Lanka	Anthony experienced complications from injuries in a July 2022 traffic collision. After coming from filming, Anthony was driving when he collided with a wild elephant. Anthony had two passengers in his vehicle, his brother Saman, and another person. Anthony died 15 months after the collision at National Hospital in Colombo.
Atsushi Aoki	1977	2019	41 years	Japanese	professional wrestler	motorcycle		Tokyo, Japan	Aoki collided with the side wall of an expressway in Chiyoda Ward, Tokyo.
Cristiano Araújo	1986	2015	29 years	Brazilian	singer and songwriter	car (passenger)	Range Rover	Goiânia, Goiás, Brazil	At approximately 3:30 am, the vehicle (driven by his bodyguard) veered off the road and rolled over. Araújo was traveling in the back seat with his girlfriend, who died at the scene, and was not wearing a seat belt. He died en route to the hospital.
Troy Archer	1955	1979	24 years	American	football player	car		North Bergen, New Jersey, US	
Nike Ardilla	1975	1995	19 years	Indonesian	rock singer and model	car	Honda Civic Genio	Bandung, West Java, Indonesia	She lost control and hit a wall.
Silvana Armenulić	1938	1976	38 years	Bosnian	singer	car	Ford Granada	Kolari, Smederevo, SFR Yugoslavia	The car was reportedly travelling 130 km/h (80 mph), when it collided with a FAP truck. Her sister, Mirjana Bajraktarević, died in the same crash.
Reg Armstrong	1926	1979	52 years	Irish	motorcycle racer	motorcycle		Avoca, County Wicklow, Ireland	
Sándor Arnóth	1960	2011	51 years	Hungarian	politician	car		Bag, Hungary	
Arputhan	1971	2023	52 years	Indian	film director	car		Chennai, India	
Carlos Arruza	1920	1966	46 years	Mexican	bullfighter	car		Toluca, Estado de Mexico, Mexico	
Kevin Ash	1959	2013	53 years	British	motorcycling journalist	motorcycle	BMW R1200G5	George, Western Cape, South Africa	
Don Ashby	1955	1981	26 years	Canadian	ice hockey player	car		Kelowna, British Columbia, Canada	Collided head-on with a pickup truck and died.
Georgi Asparuhov	1943	1971	28 years	Bulgarian	footballer	car		Bulgaria	
Bassel al-Assad	1962	1994	31 years	Syrian	eldest son and heir of president of Syria	car	Mercedes-Benz	Damascus, Syria	While driving his car at high speed through fog in the early hours of the morning, Assad is said to have collided with a motorway roundabout while not wearing a seat belt, and he died instantly.
Astrid of Sweden	1905	1935	29 years	Swedish	Queen of the Belgians	car (passenger)	Packard One-Twenty convertible	Küssnacht am Rigi, near Lake Lucerne, Schwyz, Switzerland	As the Queen pointed out something on a map to her husband, the car went off the road, down a steep slope, and slammed into a pear tree. Queen Astrid's body was ejected from the car and collided with the trunk of the tree, while the car slammed into a second tree.
Artie Atherton	1890	1920	30 years	American	Skeleton Man	pedestrian		Pontiac, Michigan, US	Suffered a punctured lung from the collision
Frank Attkisson	1955	2017	61 years	American	politician	bicycle		St. Cloud, Florida, US	
Pascale Audret	1936	2000	63 years	French	actress	car (passenger)		Brive-la-Gaillarde, Corrèze, France	
Seriki Audu	1991	2014	23 years	Nigerian	footballer	car		Bauchi State, Nigeria	
Sukhraj Aujla	1968	2013	45 years	Indian	singer	car			
Miangul Adnan Aurangzeb	1961	2022	61 years	Pakistani	politician	car		between Islamabad and Abbottabad, Pakistan	
Lauri Aus	1970	2003	32 years	Estonian	professional cyclist	bicycle		Tartu, Estonia	Aus was struck by a truck during a workout session.
Theyab Awana	1990	2011	21 years	Emirati	footballer	car		Abu Dhabi, United Arab Emirates	

== B ==
Name	Born	Died	Aged	Nationality	Notability	Mode of transport	Vehicle	Location	Details
Roland Baar	1965	2018	53 years	German	rower	car		Velpke, Germany	
Kane Hamidou Baba	1954	2021	67 years	Mauritanian	politician			near Atar, Mauritania	After the crash occurred, Baba was airlifted to a hospital in Spain, where he died from his injuries.
Éric Babin	1959	2021	61 years	New Caledonia	politician	motorcycle		New Caledonia	
Sammy Babitzin	1948	1973	24 years	Finnish	singer	car	Alfa Romeo	Route (Valtatie) 13, Hietama, Äänekoski	Babitzin travelled in a speeding car en route to a concert. The driver lost control on an icy bridge and crashed. The bridge was covered with a plywood material instead of tarmac and was known by locals as a hazardous location. Three people died, a hitchhiker survived.
Bhinod Bacha	1943	2023	80 years	Mauritian	civil servant	pedestrian		Quatre Bornes, Mauritius	Bacha was in a parking lot of a supermarket heading to his apartment when a car driven by a 53-year-old man hit him head on. The vehicle did not stop causing Bacha to be trapped underneath. Witnesses had to lift the car to get Bacha out. The driver was arrested for the incident.
Pape Badiane	1980	2016	36 years	French	basketball player	car		Frontenay-Rohan-Rohan, France	Badiane died in a car crash.
Mirjana Bajraktarević	1951	1976	25 years	Bosnian	singer	car	Ford Granada	Kolari, Smederevo, Yugoslavia	The car was reportedly travelling 130 km/h (80 mph), when it collided with a FAP truck. Her sister, Silvana Armenulić, died in the same crash.
Tarnia Baker	1967	2017	50 years	South African	politician	pedestrian		Park Rynie, South Africa	Struck by a truck while walking across a street.
Christian Bakkerud	1984	2011	26 years	Danish	retired racing driver	car	Audi RS6	Putney Heath near Wimbledon Common	Investigations ongoing.
Alper Balaban	1987	2010	22 years	Turkish	footballer	car		Karlsruhe, Germany	
Abdul Hai Baloch	1946	2022	76 years	Pakistani	politician	car		near Bahawalpur, Pakistan	Baloch met a road crash on his way to Bahawalpur and died on impact.
Shahlyla Baloch	1996	2016	20 years	Pakistani	footballer	car		Karachi, Pakistan	
Harry Bamford	1920	1958	38 years	England	footballer	motorcycle		Bristol, England, United Kingdom	Collided with a car. He remained in the hospital for three days before finally dying from his injuries on October 31.
Maurice Banach	1967	1991	24 years	German	footballer	car	Opel Omega Kombi	Autobahn near Remscheid, Germany	
Armand Joel Banaken Bassoken	1983	2023	39 years	Cameroonian	footballer	motorcycle		Indonesia	
Lisa Banes	1955	2021	65 years	American	actress	pedestrian		New York City, US	She was killed in a hit and run.
Ian Bannen	1928	1999	71 years	Scottish	actor	car	Renault Laguna	Knockies Straight, Scotland, United Kingdom	With his wife driving, hit a verge and the vehicle overturned.
Jill Banner	1946	1982	35 years	American	actress	car	Toyota	Ventura Freeway, California, US	Her car was hit by a truck on Ventura Freeway. She was thrown from the vehicle and died at North Hollywood's Riverside Hospital.
Yoshiaki Banno	1952	1991	39 years	Japanese	astronomer and co-discover	car			
Gerhard Barkhorn	1919	1983	63 years	German	World War II Luftwaffe fighter ace	car		Cologne, Germany	Crashed during a winter storm killing his wife and fatally injuring himself.
Junior Barnard	1920	1951	30 years	American	Western swing and jazz guitar player	car		Fresno County, California, US	
Jancarlos de Oliveira Barros	1983	2013	30 years	Brazilian	footballer	car			
Véronique Barrault	1958	2022	64 years	French	actress	motorcycle (passenger)		Camblanes-et-Meynac, France	The motorcycle she was a passenger on hit a vehicle in a town south of Bordeaux. While Barrault died, the driver of the motorcycle did not need to be evacuated from the vehicle and survived the crash.
Roland Barthes	1915	1980	64 years	French	philosopher	pedestrian		Paris, France	Hit by a laundry van while walking home from a lunch party hosted by François Mitterrand.
Alan Barton	1953	1995	41 years	British	singer for rock band Black Lace	tour bus		Cologne, Germany	The tour bus crashed during a hailstorm.
Sam Basil	1969	2022	52 years	Papua New Guinean	politician	car		Papua New Guinea	
Daniel Batman	1981	2012	31 years	Australian	sprinter	car		Darwin, Northern Territory, Australia	
Stiv Bators	1949	1990	40 years	American	Dead Boys and The Lords of the New Church singer	pedestrian		Paris, France	Struck by a taxi in Paris during a bank holiday. He was taken to a hospital but reportedly left before seeing a doctor, after waiting several hours and assuming he was not injured. Reports indicate that he died in his sleep as the result of a concussion.
Jeff Batters	1970	1996	25 years	American	ice hockey player	pickup truck		Trans-Canada Highway, Canmore, Alberta, Canada	Driving the wrong way down a highway access ramp at 4 am, the pickup truck drove off the road and rolled. Batters was ejected and crushed by the truck. Another passenger, 18-year-old Sherri Kalan, was also killed. The police could not determine who was driving, so all charges were dropped.
Eileen Battersby	1958	2018	60 years	Irish (born in America)	literary critic	car		Drogheda, Ireland	Battersby was critically injured in a single-vehicle crash and died later in hospital.
Orson Bean	1928	2020	91 years	American	actor	pedestrian		Los Angeles, California, US	Bean was struck and killed by two vehicles after trying to cross a street.
Carl Beane	1952	2012	59 years	American	radio announcer	SUV	2004 Suzuki	Sturbridge, Massachusetts, US	Beane suffered a heart attack while driving and crashed his car into a tree.
Napoleón Becerra	1964	2026	61 years	Peruvian	politician	car		Huaytará, Peru	Becerra survived but died shortly after being taken to a hospital
Brad Beckman	1964	1989	24 years	American	football player	car		Lilburn, Georgia, US	In icy conditions, the driver (Jeff Modesitt) bumped the rear of another vehicle and skidded into the northbound lanes of the interstate. When the driver got out to inspect the damage with Beckman still sitting in the car, a tractor-trailer rig slammed into the side of the car killing Beckman instantly and critically injuring Modesitt.
Bill Beckwith	1975	2013	38 years	American	TV show host	motorcycle		San Francisco, California, US	
Martin van Beek	1960	2018	58 years	Dutch	politician	car		Leersum, Netherlands	
Ena Begović	1960	2000	40 years	Croatian	actress	car	Jeep Grand Cherokee	Postira, Croatia	Died from injuries sustained during a vehicle rollover. The vehicle she was in was stopped on a steep hill and started moving while the driver and front passenger were outside, tumbling onto the roof of a building below.
Rachid Belhout	1944	2020	76 years	Algerian	football player and manager	car		Nancy, France	
Chris Bell	1951	1978	27 years	American	Big Star musician	car	Triumph TR7	Memphis, Tennessee	Died in a car crash while on his way home from a band rehearsal. He lost control of his vehicle and hit a light post causing it to fall on him, crushing and killing him.
Bella Bellow	1945	1973	28 years	Togolese	pop singer	car		Togo	
Vasile Belous	1988	2021	33 years	Moldovan	boxer	car		Călărășeuca, Moldova	
Jesse Belvin	1932	1960	27 years	American	Rhythm & blues singer	car		Hope, Arkansas, US	
John Bendor-Samuel	1929	2011	81 years	British	evangelical missionary, Bible linguist	car		Studley Green	Bendor-Samuel died in hospital after a car crash near his home in Studley Green.
Billel Benhammouda	1997	2022	24 years	Algerian	footballer	car			Benhammouda was involved in a crash after winning a friendly match against Congo earlier in the day. Although the crash itself was not deadly for Benhammouda and his friend, the vehicle burst into flames, trapping and killing them.
Ethel Benjamin	1875	1943	68 years	New Zealander	lawyer (a first female lawyer in the British Empire to represent a client)	pedestrian		Middlesex, England	Benjamin died in hospital after being struck by a vehicle.
Cedric Benson	1982	2019	36 years	American	football player	motorcycle		Austin, Texas, US	Collided with a minivan.
Shlomo Bentin	1946	2012	65 years	Israeli	neuropsychologist	bicycle		Berkeley, California, US	Hit by a truck.
Lamont Bentley	1973	2005	31 years	American	actor	car	Mercedes-Benz	Simi Valley, California, US	Exited the highway at high speed, ran a stop sign, went through a chain-link fence, rolled down an embankment, was ejected through the moonroof and run over by five other vehicles.
Rube Benton	1890	1937	47years	American	baseball player	car		Dothan, Alabama, US	
Irina Berezhna	1980	2017	36 years	Ukrainian	politician	car		Zadar County, Croatia	
Bob Berg	1951	2002	51 years	American	jazz saxophonist	car		East Hampton, New York, US	He collided with a cement truck that skidded on ice.
Chu Berry	1908	1941	33 years	American	jazz saxophonist	car		Conneaut, Ohio, US	
Joe Berry	1904	1958	53 years	American	baseball pitcher	car		Anaheim, California, US	
Jean-Marie Berthier	1940	2017	77 years	French	poet	car			
Gerry Bertier	1953	1981	27 years	American	football player	car	1980 Oldsmobile	Charlottesville, Virginia, US	He was on his way home from a business trip when he collided with a drunkard.
John Berylson	1953	2023	70 years	American	businessman and football club chairman	SUV	Range Rover	Falmouth, Massachusetts, US	Berylson lost control of his Range Rover, supposedly on a bend, rolling into the ravine, ultimately being found by emergency personnel upside down against a tree. Berylson was cut out of the SUV but succumbed to his injuries at the scene.
Bob Bescher	1884	1942	58 years	American	baseball player	car		London, Ohio, US	Struck by a train.
Bob Bethell	1942	2012	69 years	American	politician	car		Wabaunsee County, Kansas, US	
Nicholas Bett	1990	2018	28 years	Kenyan	track and field athlete (hurdler)	SUV	Toyota Prado	Nandi County, Kenya	Bett lost control of his vehicle, hit a bump, and landed in a ditch, killing him instantly.
Kalika Prasad Bhattacharya	1970	2017	46 years	Indian	folk singer	car		Hooghly district, West Bengal, India	
Jaspal Bhatti	1955	2012	57 years	Indian	actor	car		Jalandhar, Punjab, India	Died when the car in which he was a passenger struck a roadside tree.
Stefano Bianco	1985	2020	34 years	Italian	Motorcycle racer	motorcycle	Honda CBR600	Leinì, Italy	Collided with a truck that failed to yield when turning left, and struck a second oncoming vehicle
Tukaram Bidkar		2025		Indian	politician			Akola, India	
Piotr Bikont	1955	2017	62 years	Polish	journalist, publicist, culinary critic, theatre director	car		Sosnowiec, Poland	
Emil Bildilli	1912	1946	34 years	American	baseball player	car		Hartford City, Indiana, US	Crashed his car into a tree and died two days later.
Ondrej Binder	1970	2016	46 years	Slovak	politician	car		Banská Štiavnica, Slovakia	
Ryan Birch	1969	2013	43 years	British	judoka	car		The Bahamas	
Rob Bironas	1978	2014	36 years	American	NFL kicker	car	GMC Yukon Denali	Nashville, Tennessee, US	
Maria Bitner-Glindzicz	1963	2018	55 years	British	geneticist	bicycle		London, United Kingdom	
Black (singer), real name Colin Vearncombe	1962	2016	53 years	British	singer-songwriter	car		near Cork Airport, Ireland	Died in hospital a few weeks after the crash.
Steven Blackford	1977	2004	28 years	American	wrestler	car	Jeep	Brush, Colorado, US	
J. Stuart Blackton	1875	1941	66 years	American	film producer	pedestrian		Los Angeles, California, US	Hit by a car while crossing the street with his son and died a few days later.
Dairon Blanco	1992	2020	28 years	Cuban	footballer	car		Cienfuegos, Cuba	
Calvin Blignault	1979	2010	30 years	South African	mechanical engineer	motorcycle		Port Elizabeth, South Africa	He was hit from behind by a car while stationary at a red light.
Garen Bloch	1978	2018	39 years	South African	cyclist	bicycle		Johannesburg, South Africa	
Douglas Blubaugh	1934	2011	76 years	American	wrestler	motorcycle		Tonkawa, Oklahoma, US	
Larry Blyden	1925	1975	49 years	American	actor	car		near Agadir, Morocco	Blyden's rental car reportedly went off the road and overturned, and according to his manager, suffered injuries to the chest, head and abdomen. He underwent surgery but died of his injuries on June 6. On the audio commentary for the 2009 DVD of What Makes Sammy Run?, Blyden's co-star Barbara Rush claimed that Blyden had been carjacked by bandits and killed.
Bill Boaks	1904	1986	81 years	British	political campaigner for road safety	bus		United Kingdom	Boaks was injured in a minor road traffic crash while getting off a bus. His death in hospital two years later was the result of complications from the head injuries sustained.
Tony Boeckel	1892	1924	31 years	American	baseball player	car		San Diego, California, US	
Cris Bolado	1969	2017	47 years	Filipino	basketball player	motorcycle		Phnom Penh, Cambodia	
Marc Bolan	1947	1977	29 years	British	T.Rex musician	car (passenger)	Mini 1275GT	Queens Ride, Barnes Common, southwest London, England	Driver was girlfriend Gloria Jones.
Bonvi	1941	1995	54 years	Italian	comic book artist	pedestrian	Citroën Pallas	Bologna, Italy	Hit by a car while crossing the street
Chua Boon Huat	1980	2013	33 years	Malaysian	field hockey player	car	truck	Petaling Jaya, Malaysia	
D. Boon	1958	1985	27 years	American	The Minutemen musician	van		Tucson, Arizona	He was sleeping in the van while sick with a fever when the crash occurred.
Stephanie Booth	1946	2016	70 years	British	hotelier	car		Corwen, Denbighshire, Wales, United Kingdom	
Quincy Borrowes	1993	2017	23 years	Liberian	singer	car	Toyota Camry	Monrovia, Liberia	Quincy B died in a car crash while driving home from a gig at Anglers Bar and Restaurant.
Patrick Bosch	1964	2012	47 years	Dutch	football	car		Denekamp, Netherlands	
Günter Böttcher	1954	2012	58 years	German	Olympic handball	car		Bad Neustadt, Germany	
Saafi Boulbaba	1986	2022	36 years	Tunisian	footballer			Borj El Amri, Tunisia	
Luc Bourdon	1987	2008	21 years	Canadian	Ice hockey player	motorcycle	Suzuki GSX-R1000	Lamèque, New Brunswick, Canada	Ran into the back of a tractor-trailer after losing control of the motorbike.
Thomas Bourgin	1986	2013	26 years	French	motorcycle racer	motorcycle		Calama, Chile	
Peter "Possum" Bourne	1956	2003	47 years	New Zealander	rally driver	car	Subaru Forester	Race to the Sky track, Cardrona, New Zealand	During course inspection, Bourne collided head-on with the Jeep Cherokee of a competitor, who was later charged with dangerous driving.
Lee Bowers	1925	1966	41 years	American	witness to the assassination of President John F. Kennedy	car		Midlothian, Texas, US	His car left an empty road and struck a concrete abutment near Midlothian.
Ethan Boyes	1978	2023	44 years	American	cyclist	bicycle		San Francisco, California, US	He was sent to hospital with life-threatening injuries after a driver hit him outside Presidio Park.
Charlie Bradberry	1982	2006	24 years	American	race car driver	truck		Chelsea, Alabama, US	He was returning home from working on his racing vehicles when the fatal crash occurred.
Dennis Brain	1921	1957	36 years	British	horn virtuoso	car	Triumph TR2	Hatfield, Hertfordshire, England, United Kingdom	Was returning home from the Edinburgh Festival when the car collided with a tree.
Ed Brandt	1905	1944	39 years	American	baseball player	car		Spokane, Washington, US	
Jaime Bravo	1932	1970	37 years	Mexican	Matador	car		Zacatecas, Mexico	
Nino Bravo	1944	1973	28 years	Spanish	singer and songwriter	car	BMW 2800	Villarrubio, Cuenca, Spain	
Gianni Brera	1919	1992	73 years	Italian	sports journalist and novelist	car		Codogno, Lodi, Italy	
Jim Brewer	1937	1987	50 years	American	baseball player	car		Tyler, Texas, US	Died of his injuries after.
Michel Brière	1949	1971	21 years	Canadian	NHL player	car	Mercury Cougar	Quebec Route 117, Val-d'Or, Quebec, Canada	Crashed his car on May 15, 1970, and was ejected, suffering major head trauma. Died 11 months after the crash without regaining consciousness.
Richard Bright	1937	2006	68 years	American	actor	pedestrian		Manhattan, New York City, US	Struck by a bus.
Rolf Dieter Brinkmann	1940	1975	35 years	German	poet	pedestrian		London, England	Killed in a hit-and-run crash.
Lorenzo Brino	1998	2020	21 years	American	former child actor	car		San Bernardino County, California, US	
Jay Briscoe	1984	2023	38 years	American	professional wrestler	car		Laurel, Delaware, US	
Nick Broad		2013	38 years	English	football nutritionist	car			
Lino Brocka	1939	1991	52 years	Filipino	film director	car		Quezon City, Philippines	
Jake Brockman	1955	2009	53 years	English	musician and sound recordist (Echo & the Bunnymen)	motorcycle	ambulance	Isle of Man	
Gladys Brockwell	1893	1929	35 years	American	actress	car		Ventura Highway near Calabasas, California, US	Male friend driver, who later said he had been blinded by dust in an eye, went off-road and over a 75-foot (23 m) embankment, she was crushed under the car.
Norman Brookman	1884	1949	65 years	Australian	politician	car		South Road, Noarlunga Centre, South Australia	Head-on collision with 4t truck.
Herb Brooks	1937	2003	66 years	American	ice hockey coach, most notably of the gold medal-winning 1980 U.S. Olympic ice hockey team	car		Interstate 35 in Washington County, Minnesota, US	Believed to have fallen asleep at the wheel. Was not wearing a seat belt.
Boris Brott	1944	2022	78 years	Canadian	conductor	pedestrian		Hamilton, Ontario, Canada	Brott was reported to have been struck by a vehicle driving on the wrong side of the road on Hamilton Mountain. He was taken to hospital but died from his injuries. A 33-year-old man was arrested for the hit-and-run after a police chase.
Clifford Brown	1930	1956	25 years	American	jazz trumpeter	car (passenger)		west of Bedford, Pennsylvania, US	Powell's wife Nancy was driving at night in the rain on the Pennsylvania Turnpike, she lost control of the car and it went off the road. All three people in the car were killed in the resulting crash.
Jerome Brown	1965	1992	27 years	American	American football player	car	Chevrolet Corvette ZR1	Brooksville, Florida, US	Lost control of his car at high speed and hit a power pole. His nephew, a passenger in the car, was also killed.
Jerry Brown	1987	2012	25 years	American	football player	car		Dallas, Texas, US	Brown was a passenger in a car driven by a teammate when it skidded on a highway, hit a curb, rolled several times and caught fire.
Tara Browne	1945	1966	21 years	Irish	socialite, heir to the Guinness fortune	car	Lotus Elan	South Kensington, London, UK	Browne was driving at high speed and failed to stop at a traffic light, colliding with a parked lorry. He died of his injuries the following day. Browne's death is supposedly the source of some of the lyrics of The Beatles' song "A Day in the Life".
Bart Bryant	1962	2022	59 years	American	golfer				
Jefri Al Buchori	1973	2013	40 years	Indonesian	preacher, singer and actor	motorcycle	Kawasaki ER-6	Jakarta, Indonesia	
Jean Bugatti	1909	1939	30 years	French	automotive designer	car	Bugatti Type 57S Tank	near Duppigheim, France	
Haydn Bunton	1911	1955	44 years	Australian	Australian rules footballer	car		near Gawler, South Australia	Bunton's car left the road and hit trees. He died in hospital on September 5, 1955, four days later.
Bobby Buntrock	1952	1974	21 years	American	former child actor	car		Keystone, South Dakota, US	His car veered off a bridge under construction into Battle Creek, drowning him in the submerged car.
Gianluca Buonanno	1966	2016	50 years	Italian	Politician	car		Varese, Italy	
Michael Burawoy	1947	2025	77 years	British	sociologist and author	pedestrian		Oakland, California, US	Burawoy was hit by a vehicle while in a marked crosswalk. The vehicle that hit him left the scene.
Václav Burda	1973	2018	45 years	Czech	Ice hockey player	car		Mikulčice, Czech Republic	
Brandon Burlsworth	1976	1999	22 years	American	American football player	car		near Alpena, Arkansas, US	
Bob Burns	1950	2015	64 years	American	Lynyrd Skynyrd drummer	car		Cartersville, Georgia, US	He hit a mailbox and a tree on a sharp curve.
Jim Burns	1952	2017	65 years	American	producer	pedestrian		New York City, US	Struck by a taxi cab while crossing the street.
Cliff Burton	1962	1986	24 years	American	Metallica bass guitarist	tour bus		European route E4 in Ljungby Municipality, Sweden	Thrown out of the window and crushed after the bus skidded off the road and landed on its side.
Norman Burton	1923	2003	79 years	American	actor	car		Imperial, California, United States	Auto crash while returning from Ajijic, Mexico near the California–Arizona state line.
Fred Buscaglione	1921	1960	38 years	Italian	singer, musician	car	Ford Thunderbird	Rome, Italy	collided with a truck
Paul Bush	1956	2023	66–67 years	British	experimental film director and animator	motorcycle		Wales	
Rasual Butler	1979	2018	38 years	American	basketball player	car	Range Rover	Studio City, California, US	His wife, singer Leah LaBelle died in the same crash.
Jack Butterfield	1929	1979	50 years	American	college baseball coach and New York Yankees executive	car		Paramus, New Jersey, US	
Dennis Byrd	1966	2016	50 years	American	football	car	Hummer H2	Claremore, Oklahoma	

== C ==
Name	Birth	Death	Aged	Nationality	Notability	Mode of transport	Vehicle	Crash location	Details
Victor Cabedo	1989	2012	23 years	Spanish	cyclist	car		Almedijar, Spain	
Cadet, real name Blaine Johnson	1990	2019	28 years	British	Rapper	car (passenger)	Toyota Prius	Betley, Staffordshire, UK	Cadet and three friends were travelling to a gig at Keele University in Staffordshire. Their taxi and another car collided and Cadet was pronounced dead at the scene.
Tommy Caldwell	1949	1980	30 years	American	The Marshall Tucker Band bassist	car	Toyota Land Cruiser	Spartanburg, South Carolina, US	
Cosimo Caliandro	1982	2011	29 years	Italian	middle-distance runner	motorcycle		Francavilla Fontana, Italy	Caliandro died in a motorcycle collision.
Ahmet Yılmaz Çalık	1994	2022	27 years	Turkish	footballer	car		Ankara, Turkey	
Jason Callahan	1976	1995	19 years	American		car		Emporia, Virginia, US	Victim remained unidentified until December 2015.
Ashley Callie	1973	2008	34 years	South African	actress	car		Johannesburg, South Africa	Callie was driving home at night after an event. Her car collided with another vehicle at an intersection.
Teofilo Camomot	1914	1988	74 years	Filipino	Archbishop	car		San Fernando, Cebu, Philippines	Camomot was riding in a car when it collided with another vehicle.
Eric Campbell	1878	1917	38 years	British	silent screen star and ubiquitous nemesis of Charlie Chaplin	car		Los Angeles, California, US	
Dan Campilan	1980	2006	25 years	Filipino	newscaster	bus (passenger)	Toyota Corolla	Quezon City, Philippines	Campilan was riding in a GMA bus when it collided with another vehicle.
Albert Camus	1913	1960	46 years	French-Algerian	writer and Nobel Prize-winner	car	Facel Vega	Villeblevin, France	Michel Gallimard, the driver, was also killed.
Leopoldo Cantancio	1963	2018	54 years	Filipino	boxer	motorcycle		Bago, Negros Occidental, Philippines	
Arianne Caoili	1986	2020	33 years	Filipina	chess player	car		Yerevan, Armenia	She crashed into a bridge pillar on March 15, 2020, and died of her injuries 15 days later.
Cornelius Cardew	1936	1981	45 years	English	composer	pedestrian		Leyton, London, England	Killed in a hit and run incident. The driver of the car was never found.
Steve Cardiff	1957	2011	53 years	Canadian	politician	car		Lewes Lake, South Klondike Highway	
Heron Carvic	1913	1980	67 years	British	actor	car		Appledore, Kent, England, United Kingdom	Crashed his car into a ditch whilst travelling at high speed with a flat tyre, losing control of the vehicle in August 1979. He never fully recovered, despite an operation and a period in intensive care and died from pneumonia.
Àlex Casademunt	1981	2021	39 years	Spanish	singer, actor, TV presenter	car		Matarò, Spain	
Miquel Roger Casamada	1954	2017	62 years	Spanish	composer	car		Vilagrassa, Spain	
Marcus Cassel	1983	2006	23 years	American	football player	car		Santa Monica, California, US	
José Castillo	1981	2018	37 years	Venezuelan	baseball player (infielder)	car (passenger)		Yaracuy, Venezuela	The car he was riding in hit a fallen rock and went off the road.
Renato Cecchetto	1951	2022	70 years	Italian	actor	moped		Rome, Italy	
Martin Čech	1976	2007	31 years	Czech	ice hockey player	car		Havlíčkův Brod, Czech Republic	The deadly crash occurred in his hometown.
Cecilia	1948	1976	27 years	Spanish	singer-songwriter	car	SEAT 124	near Benavente, in Zamora Province, Spain	Musician José Luiz Gonzalez also died in the crash.
Andújar Cedeño	1969	2000	31 years	Dominican	baseball player (shortstop)	car		Santo Domingo, Dominican Republic	
Mondli Cele	1989	2016	26 years	South African	footballer	car		Pietermaritzburg, South Africa	
Giambattista Cescutti	1939	2023	84 years	Italian	basketball player and head coach	pedestrian		Udine, Italy	Cescutti was hit by a vehicle while walking in heavy rain.
Kouaro Yves Chabi	1973	2025	51 years	Beninese	politician	car		near Parakou, Benin	Chabi and his bodyguard were killed when their vehicle collided with a truck.
Rusty Chambers	1953	1981	27 years	American	football player (linebacker)	car		Hammond, Louisiana, US	
Sita Chan	1987	2013	26 years	Hong Konger	pop singer	car		Yau Ma Tei, Hong Kong	
Wilma Chan	1949	2021	72 years	American	politician	pedestrian		Alameda, California, US	
Chang Yu-sheng	1966	1997	31 years	Taiwanese	pop singer, composer and producer	car	Saab 900	Tamsui District, New Taipei City, Taiwan	
Kak Channthy	1980	2018	38 years	Cambodian	singer (member of Cambodian Space Project)	auto rickshaw		Phnom Penh, Cambodia	
Harry Chapin	1942	1981	38 years	American	musician and film producer	car	Volkswagen Rabbit	Long Island Expressway, New York, US	A truck hit him from behind.
Virgil Chapman	1895	1951	55 years	American	United States Senator from Kentucky	car		Washington, DC, US	
Vernal Charles	1985	2013	27 years	South African	cricketer	car		Port Elizabeth, South Africa	
Sonika Chauhan	1989	2017	27 years	Indian	actress	car		Kolkata, India	
Ernest Chausson	1855	1899	44 years	French	composer	bicycle		Limay, Yvelines, France	Collision with wall.
Germán Chaves	1995	2023	28 years	Colombian	professional cyclist	bicycle		Chocontá, Colombia	Training with his father when they were both hit by a truck. Germán died instantly while his father later died in hospital
Nikolay Chebotko	1982	2021	38 years	Kazakhstani	cross country skier	car		Burabay District, Kazakhstan	
Yelena Chernykh	1979	2011	32 years	Russian	actress	car		Novoanninsky, Volgograd Oblast, Russia	Chernykh died in car collision.
Steve Chiasson	1967	1999	32 years	Canadian	hockey player	pickup truck		North Carolina, US	Fell out of truck after collision. Was over drink-drive limit.
Merab Chigoev	1951	2016	64 years	South Ossetian	politician	car		Tskhinvali, South Ossetia, Georgia	
Gwinyai Chingoka	1982	2022	39 years	Zimbabwean	tennis player	pedestrian		Harare, Zimbabwe	Chingoka was hit by a vehicle on his way home from a private function. Zimbabwean cricket player Tarisai Musakanda was charged in connection to his death.
Ron Chippindale	1933	2008	74 years	New Zealander	Chief Inspector of Air Accidents	pedestrian		Porirua, near Wellington, New Zealand	Chippindale, who investigated many airplane crashes, most notably the crash of Air New Zealand Flight 901 into Mount Erebus, Antarctica, was struck by an out of control car while walking near his home.
Tim Choate	1954	2004	49 years	American	actor	motorcycle		Los Angeles, California, US	
Dugald Christie	1941	2006	either 64 or 65 years	Canadian	lawyer and political activist	bicycle		Sault Ste. Marie, Ontario, Canada	Collision with truck.
Mieczysław Cieślar	1950	2010	60 years	Polish	theologian and bishop	car		Przecław, Łódź Voivodeship, Poland	
Bob Clark	1939	2007	67 years	American	film director	car	Infiniti I30	Pacific Coast Highway, near Pacific Palisades, Los Angeles, California, US	Collision with SUV.
Earl Clark	1907	1938	30 years	American	baseball player	car		Washington, D.C., US	Collided with a streetcar.
Kevin Clark	1988	2021	32 years	American	child actor and professional drummer	Bicycle		Chicago, Illinois, US	Clark was riding his bicycle in Avondale, a neighborhood in Chicago, near a notoriously dangerous intersection in the Northwest Side of Chicago. Clark was struck and killed by a Hyundai Sonata driven by a 20-year-old woman in the early morning. Clark died after being taken to Illinois Masonic Medical Center.
Spencer Clark	1987	2006	19 years	American	NASCAR driver	truck		near Albuquerque, New Mexico, US	Truck was carrying a car and fell over.
Tom Clark	1941	2018	77 years	American	poet	pedestrian		Berkeley, California, US	Clark was hit by a car while crossing the street. He later died from his injuries.
Terrence Clarke	2001	2021	19 years	American	college basketball player	car	Genesis GV80	Los Angeles, California, US	
Claudisabel	1976	2022	46 years	Portuguese	singer	car		Alcácer do Sal, Portugal	
Judy Clay	1938	2001	62 years	American	soul and gospel singer	car		Fayetteville, North Carolina, US	She died a few weeks after a crash.
Sam Cobean	1913	1951	37 years	American	cartoonist	car		Schuyler County, New York, US	He lost control and collided into a tree
Eddie Cochran	1938	1960	21 years	American	musician	taxi	Ford Consul	A4 in Chippenham, Wiltshire, England, United Kingdom	Taxi blew a tyre and collided with a lamppost. Gene Vincent and Sharon Sheeley, the other passengers, survived the crash.
Ludo Coeck	1955	1985	30 years	Belgian	footballer	car	BMW	near Rumst, Belgium	Collision with Median strip, a.k.a. central reservation.
Alexis Cohen	1983	2009	25 years	American	actress and American Idol participant	Pedestrian	Mitsubishi Galant	Seaside Heights, New Jersey, US	Killed in a "hit-and-run" incident. The driver of the car, Daniel Bark, was arrested and charged with drunk driving and leaving the scene of a crash.
Felipe Colares	1994	2023	29 years	Brazilian	mixed martial artist			Rio de Janeiro, Brazil	Colares was returning from training when he was reportedly hit by a bus. The fire department arrived but Colares died on his way to hospital.
Brian Cole	1979	2001	22 years	American	baseball player	car		Marianna, Florida, US	
John Coleman	1863	1922	61 years	American	baseball player	pedestrian		Detroit, Michigan, US	
Bonar Colleano	1924	1958	34 years	American	actor	car		Queensway Tunnel, Birkenhead, United Kingdom	
Alex Collins	1994	2023	28 years	American	football player	motorcycle		Lauderdale Lakes, Florida, US	Collins collided with the rear of a SUV making a left turn, causing him to go through the window.
Billy Collins	1961	1984	22 years	American	boxer	car	1972 Oldsmobile Cutlass	Antioch, Tennessee, US	Collision with culvert.
Jerry Collins	1980	2015	34 years	New Zealander	rugby union player and former All Black	car		Béziers, France	Collision with bus. Partner Alana Madill was also killed however Collins' daughter Ayla survived.
Rob Collins	1965	1996	33 years	English	musician and keyboardist of The Charlatans	car	BMW	Monmouth, Wales, United Kingdom	Was over the drink-drive limit and not wearing a seat belt.
Mike Colman	1968	1994	25 years	American	ice hockey player	car		Kansas City, Missouri, US	
Coluche	1944	1986	41 years	French	comedian	motorcycle		Opio, Alpes-Maritimes, France	Collision with truck.
Amie Comeaux	1976	1997	21 years	American	country singer	car	Dodge Avenger	near Baton Rouge, Louisiana, US	Car overturned.
Tom Compernolle	1975	2008	32 years	Belgian	middle-distance runner	army truck		Zedelgem, West Flanders, Belgium	Compernolle died in an accident during an army exercise.
Adam Comrie	1990	2020	30 years	Canadian-American	ice hockey player (defenceman)	motorcycle		Leesburg, Virginia, US	
Gene Connell	1906	1937	31 years	American	baseball player	car		Waverly, New York, US	
Ashleigh Connor	1989	2011	21 years	Australian	soccer player	car		Cataract, New South Wales, Australia	
Pete Conrad	1930	1999	69 years	American	lunar astronaut	motorcycle		Ojai, California, US	Veered off-road and crashed.
Ryan Dallas Cook	1982	2005	23 years	American	musician (Suburban Legends)	motorcycle		Costa Mesa Freeway, near Orange, California, US	Collision with car.
Tom Cooper	1904	1940	36 years	English	Footballer	motorcycle		Aldeburgh, England	Cooper was out on his despatch motorcycle when he collided with a lorry and was killed. An enquiry took place into his death with the outcome being an order that stated despatch riders were no longer allowed to ride their motorcycles without wearing a crash helmet.
William Coperthwaite		2013	83 years	American	yurt building	car		Washington, Maine, US	
Marjorie Corcoran	1950	2017	66 years	American	particle physicist, professor	bicycle	train	Houston, Texas, US	Collided with a METRORail train while bicycling.
Diogo Correa de Oliveira	1983	2021	38 years	Brazilian	footballer	motorcycle		Maringá, Brazil	
Eddie Costa	1930	1962	31 years	American	jazz musician	car		New York City, US	
Russell Coughlin	1960	2016	56 years	Welsh	footballer	car		Carlisle, Cumbria, England, United Kingdom	Coughlin rides in a car when it collided with another vehicle.
Stephen Covey	1932	2012	79 years	American	author, professional speaker, professor, consultant, management-expert	bike		Provo, Utah	Complications after falling off a bike.
Joy Covey	1963	2013	50 years	American	business executive	bicycle		Portola Valley, California, US	Complications after struck by delivery van.
Joey Covington	1945	2013	67 years	American	musician	car		Palm Springs, California, US	
Arnaud Coyot	1980	2013	33 years	French	cyclist	bicycle		Amiens, France	
Kenneth Craik	1914	1945	31 years	British	philosopher and psychologist	bicycle		Cambridge, England, United Kingdom	Struck by a car while cycling.
Gottfried von Cramm	1909	1976	67 years	German	tennis player	car		near Cairo, Egypt	
Seymour Cray	1925	1996	71 years	American	supercomputer architect	car	Jeep Cherokee	Interstate 25 near Colorado Springs, Colorado, US	Collision with another vehicle.
Tonya Crews	1938	1966	28 years	American	model and Playboy Playmate	car			
Tom Crooke	1884	1929	44 years	American	baseball player	bus (passenger)			
Alan Crosland	1894	1936	41 years	American	film director	car		Sunset Boulevard, Los Angeles, California, US	
Bob Cryer	1934	1994	59 years	British	Labour MP	car	Rover	M1 motorway near Watford, England, United Kingdom	Car overturned on motorway. His wife, Ann, survived the crash.
Laurie Cunningham	1956	1989	33 years	English	footballer	car	Renault 5 GTI	Madrid, Spain	Car collided with barrier and overturned.
Joseph Cure	1983	2015	31 years	American	actor and ice hockey player	car		Ennis, Montana, US	Slick conditions made for risky driving.
Pierre Curie	1859	1906	46 years	French	chemist and physicist, 1903 Nobel Prize recipient	pedestrian		Rue Dauphine, Paris, France	Run over by a horse-drawn vehicle.
Greg Curnoe	1936	1992	55 years	Canadian	painter	bicycle		Delaware, Ontario, Canada	Knocked down by a pickup truck.
Steve Currie	1947	1981	33 years	British	bassist for T. Rex	car		Algarve, Portugal	
Mac Curtis	1939	2013	74 years	American	singer	car		Weatherford, Texas, US	
Ian Cuttler	1971	2014	43 years	Mexican	art director, photographer & graphic design	car		Los Angeles, California, US	

== D ==
Name	Birth	Death	Aged	Nationality	Notability	Mode of transport	Vehicle	Crash location	Details
Jay Dahl	1945	1965	19 years	American	baseball player	car (passenger)	GTO	Salisbury, North Carolina, US	
Jack Dakin	1996	2016	19 years	British	drummer of the rock band Viola Beach	car (passenger)	Nissan Qashqai	Södertälje, Sweden	All four members of the band died in this crash, along with their manager Craig Tarry.
LaShawn Daniels	1977	2019	41 years	American	songwriter	car		South Carolina, US	
Omar Daoud	1983	2018	35 years	Libyan	footballer	car		Cyrene, Libya	
Vitaly Daraselia	1957	1982	25 years	Georgian	footballer	car		Zestaponi, Georgia	
Troy Dargan	1997	2023	26 years	Australian	rugby league player	motorcycle		Aitutaki, Cook Islands	
Mike Darr	1976	2002	25 years	American	baseball player	car		Peoria, Arizona, US	
Betty Jack Davis	1932	1953	21 years	American	country music singer; one half of The Davis Sisters	car		near Cincinnati, Ohio, US	Skeeter Davis (no relation), the other half of the Davis Sisters, was seriously injured in the same crash. She recovered and went on to a successful recording career whereas Betty did not survive.
Jimmy Davis	1982	2003	21 years	British	Manchester United footballer	car	BMW 3 series	M40 motorway in Oxfordshire, England, United Kingdom	Crashed into back of truck. Was twice over the drink-drive limit.
Victor Davis	1964	1989	25 years	Canadian	swimmer, Olympic gold medallist	pedestrian		Sainte-Anne-de-Bellevue, Quebec, Canada	Outside a nightclub in a Montreal suburb, Davis was struck by a car whose driver fled the scene. It was later determined that, due to an earlier verbal altercation with the driver, Davis had walked to the middle of the road and was brandishing a juice bottle toward the car at the time he was struck. Two days later, Davis died of his injuries in hospital. In February 1992, Glen Crossley was found guilty of leaving the scene of a crash and was sentenced to ten months in prison, ultimately serving four months.
Ann Day	1938	2016	77 years	American	politician	car		Tucson, Arizona, US	Died in a multi-vehicle crash caused by an impaired driver.
James Dean	1931	1955	24 years	American	actor	car	Porsche 550 Spyder	near Cholame, California, US	See here
Stelio De Carolis	1937	2017	80 years	Italian	politician	car		Meldola, Emilia-Romagna, Italy	
Andrea de Cesaris	1959	2014	55 years	Italian	racing driver	motorcycle		Rome, Italy	Was killed in a motorcycle crash on the Grande Raccordo Anulare motorway in Rome.
Rube DeGroff	1879	1955	76 years	American	baseball player	car		Poughkeepsie, New York, US	Struck head-on by a drunk driver.
Wisse Dekker	1924	2012	88 years	Dutch	businessman	car		Zoutelande, Netherlands	
Roger Delgado	1918	1973	55 years	British	actor	car		Republic of Turkey	Delgado died on location in Turkey while shooting an episode of French TV show La cloche tibétaine (Bell of Tibet). Two Turkish film technicians were killed in the same crash.
Jonathan Delisle	1977	2006	28 years	Canadian	ice hockey player	car		Beauce, Quebec, Canada	
Dorothy Dell	1915	1934	19 years	American	actress	car (passenger)		Altadena, California, US	Driver hit a telephone pole, bounced off a palm tree, and finally hit a boulder. Dell was killed instantly while the driver died hours later.
Miguel Del Toro	1972	2001	29 years	Mexican	baseball player (pitcher)	car		Ciudad Obregón, Sonora, Mexico	
Andy DeMize	1983	2009	25 years	Mexican-American	musician; drummer for the band Nekromantix	car	1972 Chevrolet Nova	outside Fullerton, California, US	He lost control and hit a tree causing the vehicle to catch fire.
Dener	1971	1994	23 years	Brazilian	footballer	car	1992 Mitsubishi Eclipse	Rio de Janeiro, Brazil	
Willie Dennis	1926	1965	39 years	American	jazz trombonist	car		New York City, US	
Joe DeSa	1959	1986	27 years	American	baseball player	car		Cayey, Puerto Rico	
Tony Destra	1954	1987	32 years	American	glam metal musician; drummer for Cinderella	car		Pennsylvania, US	
Brandon deWilde	1942	1972	30 years	American	actor	camper van		Denver, Colorado, US	He went off the roadway, struck a guardrail and then a parked truck. Not seat-belted, he was then pinned in the wreckage as the camper rolled onto its side. He later died of his injuries in the hospital.
Kazimierz Deyna	1947	1989	41 years	Polish	footballer	car	BMW	San Diego, California, US	
Rudy Dhaenens	1961	1998	36 years	Belgian	cyclist	car		Aalst, Belgium	He died in a car crash on his way to the start of the Tour of Flanders.
Arnold Diamond	1915	1992	76 years	British	actor	car		Bournemouth, Dorset, England, United Kingdom	Whilst on holiday in Bournemouth with his wife, he was hit by a car and hospitalised. He never regained consciousness and died a week later.
Diana, Princess of Wales	1961	1997	36 years	British	member of British royal family	car (passenger)	1994 Mercedes-Benz S280 W140	Pont de l'Alma road tunnel, Paris, France	See here
Sandra Dianne	1994	2020	25 years	Malaysian	singer	car	Haval H1	Putrajaya, Malaysia	
Mike Dickin	1943	2006	63 years	British	radio DJ	car		Bodmin, Cornwall, England, United Kingdom	
Joel DiGregorio	1944	2011	67 years	American	keyboardist for Charlie Daniels' band	car		Cheatham County, Tennessee, US	He was driving on Interstate 40 to meet with the band at their tour bus when the fatal crash occurred.
Lou DiMuro	1931	1982	51 years	American	baseball umpire	pedestrian		Arlington, Texas, US	
Nh. Dini	1936	2018	82 years	Indonesian	novelist	taxi (passenger)	Toyota Avanza	Semarang, Indonesia	The taxi she was riding in collided with a truck.
Mlondi Dlamini	1997	2017	20 years	South African	footballer	car		KwaZulu-Natal, South Africa	
Alfred Dobbs	1882	1945	63 years	British	politician	car		Doncaster, England, United Kingdom	Dobbs' car was in collision with a military vehicle.
Marshall Dodge	1935	1982	47 years	American	humorist	bicycle		Waimea, Hawaii, US	He was struck by a motorist.
Ian Stuart Donaldson	1957	1993	36 years	British	neo-Nazi musician	car	Volkswagen Polo	near Burnaston, Derbyshire, England, United Kingdom	
Françoise Dorléac	1942	1967	25 years	French	film actress	car	Renault 10	A8 autoroute near Villeneuve-Loubet	While en route to Nice airport, Dorléac lost control of her car, which collided with a signpost and burst into flames. A witness saw her struggling to escape and tried to help, but the flames engulfed the car and she burned to death.
Ibrahim Dossey	1972	2008	36 years	Ghanaian	footballer	car		Breaza, Romania	The crash occurred on September 13, 2008, putting him in a coma until his death three months later.
Dee Dowis	1968	2016	48 years	American	football	car		Gwinnett County, Georgia, US	
Danielle Downey	1980	2014	33 years	American	professional golfer	single-car		Lee County, Alabama, US	
Brian Drebber	1950	2018	68 years	American	sportscaster for Speed	motorcycle		Canton, Georgia, US	While en route to an airport, he hit a deer and died.
Karl Drews	1920	1963	43 years	American	baseball player	pedestrian		Dania, Florida, US	His car stalled and Drews had exited it to try to flag down a passing motorist for help. While standing at the roadside, he was struck and killed by a drunk driver.
Charles R. Drew	1904	1950	45 years	American	surgeon, blood transfusion researcher	car		Burlington, North Carolina, US	
Bridget Driscoll	1852	1896	44 years	British	The first pedestrian victim of an automobile crash in the United Kingdom.	pedestrian		Crystal Palace, London	One of the earliest recorded road crash victims.
Piero Drogo	1926	1973	46 years	Italian	racing driver and coachbuilder	car	Ferrari 250 California	Bologna, Italy	Crashed into a broken down truck in a tunnel; both were unlit.
Alexander Dubček	1921	1992	70 years	Slovak	politician	car	BMW 535i	D1 highway near Humpolec, Czech Republic	Car veered off-road.
Gus Dudgeon	1942	2002	59 years	British	record producer	car	Jaguar XK8	M4 motorway between Reading and Maidenhead in England, United Kingdom	Car veered off-road.
Fred Duesenberg	1876	1932	55 years	American	automobile pioneer, designer and manufacturer	car	Duesenberg	Lincoln Highway near Jennerstown, Pennsylvania, US	Car overturned. Duesenberg died in hospital after being comatose for three weeks.
Boet van Dulmen	1948	2021	73 years	Dutch	motorcycle racer	bicycle		Ammerzoden, Netherlands	Collided with a van.
Glenn Dunaway	1914	1964	49 years	American	race car driver	car		near Camden, South Carolina, US	Struck by a Seaboard Air Line Railroad train at a railroad crossing.
Isadora Duncan	1877	1927	50 years	American	dancer	car	Amilcar	Nice, France	Strangled by scarf getting tangled in rear wheel of open-top sports car. Thrown out onto road, died instantly.
Joey Dunlop	1952	2000	48 years	British	motorcycle racer	motorcycle		Tallinn, Estonia	Died in an open-road race.
William Dunlop	1984	2018	33 years	Irish	motorcycle racer	motorcycle		County Dublin, Ireland	
Ryan Dunn	1977	2011	34 years	American	reality television personality and daredevil (MTV's Jackass)	car	Porsche 911 GT3	Chester County, Pennsylvania, US	Collided with tree. Was twice over the drink-drive limit.
Junior Durkin	1915	1935	19 years	American	actor	car (passenger)		San Diego, California, US	While returning home from a hunting trip in Mexico, the driver swerved to avoid a collision and crashed at the side of the road. Several other passengers also died.
Al Dvorin	1923	2004	81 years	American	Elvis Presley concert announcer	car		near Ivanpah, California, US	

== E ==
Name	Birth	Death	Aged	Nationality	Notability	Mode of transport	Vehicle	Crash location	Details
Dave Early	1957	1996	39 years	British	drummer (Sade)	car		Ireland	
Mark Eaton	1957	2021	64 years	American	basketball player	bike		Park City, Utah, US	
Donald Eccles	1908	1986	77 years	British	actor	car		Brighton, England, United Kingdom	
Paul Edmondson	1943	1970	27 years	American	baseball player	car		Santa Barbara, California, US	
Jerry Edmonton	1946	1993	47 years	Canadian	drummer for rock band Steppenwolf	car		Santa Ynez, California, US	
Colin Edwards	1991	2013	21 years	Guyanese	footballer	motorcycle		Georgetown, Guyana	
Jim Joe Edwards	1894	1965	70 years	American	baseball pitcher	car		Sarepta, Mississippi, US	
Mike Edwards	1948	2010	62 years	British	Electric Light Orchestra cellist	van		Devon, England, United Kingdom	Edwards was killed on the A381 road between Harbertonford and Halwell near where he lived in Totnes in Devon when a cylindrical hay bale weighing 1,300 pounds (590 kg) rolled down a hillside and collided with the van he was driving.
Bjarte Eikeset	1937	2017	80 years	Norwegian	politician	car		Eikefjord, Norway	Collided with an RV.
Martín Elías	1990	2017	26 years	Colombian	singer	car		Sincelejo, Colombia	
Kevin Ellison	1987	2018	31 years	American	football player	car			
Jimbo Elrod	1954	2016	62 years	American	football player	car		Chandler, Oklahoma, US	
Edem Ephraim	1959	1996	36 years	British	singer and one half of the London Boys	car		Eastern Alps, Austria	His colleague, Dennis Fuller, also died in the head-on collision with a drunken Swiss.
Zeyad Errafae’ie	1969	2009	40 years	Syrian	Voice/television actor	car		Damascus, Syria	
Chit Estella	1957	2011	53 years	Filipina	journalist and professor	bus (passenger)			
Greg Evers	1955	2017	62 years	American	politician	car		Okaloosa County, Florida, US	

== F ==
Name	Birth	Death	Aged	Nationality	Notability	Mode of transport	Vehicle	Crash location	Details
Pål Arne Fagernes	1974	2003	29 years	Norwegian	athlete (javelin)	car		European route E6 near Moss, Norway	Collided with a truck.
Jock Fahey	1911	1936	24 years	Australian	Australian rules footballer	bicycle		between Numurkah and Wunghnu, Australia	Struck by a vehicle returning to his home in Wunghnu.
Falco	1957	1998	40 years	Austrian	rock musician	SUV	Mitsubishi Montero	Puerto Plata, Dominican Republic	Collided with a bus.
Jessica Falkholt	1988	2018	29 years	Australian	actress	car		Sydney, New South Wales, Australia	She was a passenger in a two car collision which also took the lives of her parents, sister and the driver of the other vehicle. Falkholt died in hospital 22 days later.
Oussama Falouh	1999	2023	24 years	Moroccan	footballer	car (passenger)		Casablanca, Morocco	The car Falouh was in crashed into a large truck. He had multiple brain haemorrhages, a broken neck and thorax. After being in a coma for almost a month, he succumbed to his injuries.
Housseyn Fardjallah	1993	2016	23 years	Algerian	weightlifter	car			
Giuseppe Farina	1906	1966	59 years	Italian	inaugural Formula One world champion	car	Lotus Cortina	Chambéry, France	
Richard Fariña	1937	1966	29 years	American	musician and writer	motorcycle		Carmel Valley Road, Carmel, California, US	Motorbike veered off-road.
Richard Farrell	1926	1958	31 years	New Zealander	classical pianist	car		Arundel, Sussex, England, United Kingdom	
Turk Farrell	1934	1977	43 years	American	baseball pitcher	car		Great Yarmouth, Norfolk, England, United Kingdom	
John R. "Bo" Farrington	1936	1964	28 years	American	football player	car	Volkswagen Beetle	Rensselaer, Indiana, US	Teammate Willie Galimore also died in the crash when they were ejected from the vehicle as it rolled multiple times.
Dodi Fayed	1955	1997	42 years	Egyptian	companion of Diana, Princess of Wales	car	1994 Mercedes-Benz S280 W140	Pont de l'Alma road tunnel, Paris, France	Fayed was traveling with Diana, Princess of Wales at the time of the crash. Both were killed in this crash along with the driver of the car, Henri Paul; Fayed's bodyguard, Trevor Rees-Jones survived. Further reading: Death of Diana, Princess of Wales
Dan Fegan	1961	2018	56 years	American	basketball agent	SUV	bus	near Aspen, Colorado, US	
Cheo Feliciano	1935	2014	78 years	Puerto Rican	composer and singer	singer-car		San Juan, Puerto Rico	
Mike Fellows	1957	2016	58 years	American	politician	car		Missoula County, Montana, US	Fellows collided with another vehicle.
Torsten Fenslau	1964	1993	29 years	German	record producer, DJ (Culture Beat)	car	Mercedes-Benz 500SL	Landesstraße 3097, near Messel, Hessen, Germany	Fenslau lost control of his car, causing it to roll several times before coming to rest in a field. Not seat-belted, he was thrown from the vehicle, dying in the hospital a short time later.
Scott Fenton	1964	1989	24 years	Australian	basketball player	car	Honda	Perth, Western Australia, Australia	
Myles Ferguson	1981	2000	19 years	Canadian	child actor	car		Vancouver, British Columbia, Canada	
Alberto Fernández	1955	1984	29 years	Spanish	road racing cyclist	car		near Aranda de Duero, Burgos Province, Spain	His wife was also killed in the crash.
Rommel Fernández	1966	1993	27 years	Panamanian	footballer	car		near Albacete, Spain	His cousin, Ronny Rojo, survived the crash.
Pietro Ferrero Jr.	1963	2011	47 years	Italian	businessman	bicycle		Camps Bay, South Africa	
Amela Fetahović	1986	2021	35 years	Bosnian	footballer	car		Sarajevo, Bosnia & Herzegovina	
Peter Fisher	1950	2018	67 years	British	physician	bicycle		High Holborn, London, United Kingdom	
Aaron Flahavan	1975	2001	25 years	English	footballer	car	BMW sports car	near Bournemouth, England, United Kingdom	
János Flesch	1933	1983	50 years	Hungarian	chess grandmaster	car		Whitstable, England, United Kingdom	
Jeff Fletcher		2014	36 years	British	indie rock musician (Northern Uproar)	pedestrian		Stockport, England, United Kingdom	He was hit by a lorry and was decapitated.
Zenon de Fleur	1951	1979	27 years	British	guitarist for rock band The Count Bishops	car	Aston Martin	London, England	
Ibrahima Fofana	1952	2010	57 years	Guinean	trade unionist	car		Fria, Guinea	
Wenty Ford	1946	1980	33 years	Bahamian	baseball player	car		Nassau, Bahamas	
Jack Foster	1932	2004	72 years	New Zealander	marathon runner	bicycle		Rotorua, New Zealand	
Arthur Fox	1924	1953	29 years	Australian	Australian rules football player	motorcycle		Mildura, Victoria, Australia	
Charley Fox	1920	2008	88 years	Canadian	RCAF fighter pilot	car		Tillsonburg, Ontario, Canada	
Stan Fox	1952	2000	48 years	American	racing driver	van		Desert Road, south of Auckland, New Zealand	
Danny Frawley	1963	2019	56 years	Australian	Australian rules footballer	car		Millbrook, Victoria, Australia	
Pete de Freitas	1961	1989	27 years	Trinidadian	drummer (Echo & the Bunnymen)	motorcycle		Longdon Green, England, United Kingdom	Collided with a motor vehicle while on his way to Liverpool from London.
Pat Frink	1945	2012	67 years	American	basketball player	car		Tucson, Arizona, US	
Frankie Frisch	1898	1973	74 years	American	baseball player	car		Wilmington, Delaware, US	Frisch died from injuries sustained in a car crash in Elkton, Maryland, one month earlier.
Marcelo Fromer	1961	2001	39 years	Brazilian	musician for rock band Titãs	pedestrian		São Paulo, Brazil	He was hit by a motorcyclist while jogging.
Norman Fruchter	1937	2023	85 years	American	writer and academic	pedestrian		New York City, US	Fruchter died January 4, 2023, of injuries sustained on December 22, 2022, when a driver who was speeding in reverse backed into him on 68th Street in Bay Ridge while he was walking home.
Dennis Fuller	1959	1995	36 years	Jamaican	singer and one half of London Boys	car		Eastern Alps, Austria	His colleague, Edem Ephraim, also died in the head-on collision with a drunken Swiss.
Terry Furlow	1954	1980	25 years	American	basketball player	car		Linndale, Ohio, US	Cocaine and Valium were found in his system.
Futuregrapher	1983	2025	41 years	Icelandic	electronic music musician	car		Reykjavík, Iceland	Died two days after his car crashed into the sea at Reykjavík Harbor on New Year's Eve.
Mduduzi Fuzwayo	1986	2023	36 years	Zimbabwean	cricketer	car		Zimbabwe	

== G ==
Name	Birth	Death	Aged	Nationality	Notability	Mode of transport	Vehicle	Crash location	Details
Gary Gabelich	1940	1984	43 years	American	land speed record holder	motorcycle		Long Beach, California, US	Collision with truck.
Rino Gaetano	1950	1981	30 years	Italian	singer-songwriter	car	Volvo 343	Via Nomentana, Rome, Italy	Collision with truck.
Gennadi Gagulia	1948	2018	70 years	Abkhazian	politician	car		Miusera, Abkhazia, Georgia	
Bryan Gahol	1977	2014	36 years	Filipino	basketball player	van	Nissan Urvan Escapade	South Luzon Expressway, Philippines	He and Manalo were declared dead upon arrival at the hospital.
Wahome Gakuru	1966	2017	51 years	Kenyan	politician	car		Thika, Kiambu County	
Willie Galimore	1935	1964	29 years	American	football player	car	Volkswagen Beetle	Rensselaer, Indiana, US	Teammate John R. "Bo" Farrington also died in the crash when they were ejected from the vehicle as it rolled multiple times.
Niccolò Galli	1983	2001	17 years	Italian	footballer	motorcycle		Bologna, Italy	Collided with Median strip, a.k.a. central reservation.
Julio Gallo	1910	1993	83 years	American	winemaker	car		near Tracy, California, US	Car veered off-road.
Rosman García	1979	2011	32 years	Venezuelan	baseball player (relief pitcher)	car		Aragua, Venezuela	
Scott Garland	1952	1979	27 years	Canadian	ice hockey player	car		Montreal, Quebec, Canada	Blew a tire, lost control and hit a wall.
Juan Garriga	1963	2015	52 years	Spanish	Grand Prix motorcycle racer	motorcycle		Spain	
Patrick Gasienica	1998	2022	24 years	American	ski jumper	motorcycle		Bull Valley, Illinois, US	
Bob Gassoff	1953	1977	24 years	Canadian	ice hockey player	motorcycle		near Villa Ridge, Missouri, US	Head-on collision with car.
Antoni Gaudí	1852	1926	73 years	Spanish	architect	pedestrian		Barcelona, Spain	Struck by a tram and died from his injuries three days later.
Johnny Gaudreau	1993	2024	31 years	American	ice hockey player	bicycle		Oldmans Township, New Jersey, US	Struck by vehicle while cycling.
Janet Gaynor	1906	1984	77 years	American	actress	car		San Francisco, California, US	The crash occurred in 1982 in San Francisco, California when a van ran a red light and crashed into the vehicle that Janet, her husband Paul Gregor, actress Mary Martin and her manager were in. Gaynor died of her injuries two years thereafter in a Palm Springs, California, hospital along with pneumonia and other ailments.
Mike Gazella	1895	1978	82 years	American	baseball player	car		Odessa, Texas, US	
Jeremy Geathers	1986	2017	30 years	American	football player	limousine		Las Vegas, Nevada, US	
Giuliano Gemma	1938	2013	75 years	Italian	actor	car		Civitavecchia, Italy	Two passengers died in car crash.
Bill George	1929	1982	52 years	American	American football Hall of Famer	van		Rockford, Illinois, US	George was driving eastbound on Illinois 72 when a tractor-trailer struck his van at an intersection.
Ifeanyi George	1993	2020	26 years	Nigerian	footballer	car		Abudu, Nigeria	George, a teammate, and a friend all died in the fatal car crash.
Mat George	1995	2021	26 years	American	podcast host	pedestrian		Los Angeles, US	He was killed in a hit-and-run crash.
Vladimir Gerasimov	1989	2018	28 years	Russian	footballer	motorcycle		Zhejiang, China	
Melody Gersbach	1985	2010	24 years	Filipina	beauty pageant contestant	bus (passenger)		Bula, Camarines Sur, Philippines	Gersbach was riding in a bus when it collided with a vehicle.
Marie-Christine Gessinger	1992	2010	17 years	Austrian	fashion model	car (passenger)	Volkswagen Golf	Austria	Struck a tree at 150 km/h in a 100 km/h limit zone.
Ghazi of Iraq	1912	1939	27 years		King of Iraq 1933–1939	car		Baghdad, Kingdom of Iraq	Ghazi died in 1939 in a mysterious crash involving a sports car he was driving. Some believe he was killed on the orders of Nuri as-Said.
Ray Gibb	1928	1953	24 years	Australian	Australian rules footballer	motorcycle		Vermont, Victoria, Australia	Crashed into a milk cart.
Martin Gilks	1965	2006	41 years	British	drummer for The Wonder Stuff	motorbike		Tooting, London, England	Lost control of motorbike and crashed.
Brian Gilmore	1933	1959	26 years	Australian	Australian rules footballer	car		Wangaratta, Victoria, Australia	
Maximiliano Giusti	1991	2016	25 years	Argentinian	footballer	car		Buenos Aires, Argentina	
Edward Givens	1930	1967	37 years	American	NASA astronaut and fighter pilot	car	Volkswagen	Pearland, Texas, US	On June 6, 1967, Givens was driving home from a meeting of the Quiet Birdmen fraternal organization, with two other officers, when he missed a sharp, unmarked turn and crashed into a ditch, near the Manned Spacecraft Center.
Alicia Gladden	1985	2013	27 years	American	basketball player	car		Avondale, Florida, US	
Jeff Gladney	1996	2022	25 years	American	football player (cornerback)	car		Dallas, Texas, US	
Terry Glenn	1974	2017	43 years	American	football player (wide receiver)	car		Irving, Texas, US	
Go Eun-bi	1992	2014	21 years	South Korean	singer (member of Ladies' Code)	van	Hyundai Grand Starex	Yeongdong Expressway, Yongin, Gyeonggi-do, South Korea	
Keith Godchaux	1948	1980	32 years	American	pianist for the Grateful Dead	car (passenger)		Marin County, California, US	Sustained head injuries in a crash.
Johnathan Goddard	1981	2008	27 years	American	Arena League football player	motorcycle		Clay County, Florida, US	
David Gold	1980	2011	31 years	Canadian	doom metal musician (Woods of Ypres)	car		Barrie, Ontario, Canada	
Andrew Golden	1986	2019	33 years	American	one of the perpetrators of the Westside Middle School shooting in Jonesboro, Arkansas, in 1998	SUV	2017 Honda CRV	Cave City, Arkansas, US	Golden and the driver of the vehicle that he collided with both died. Golden and the other perpetrator of the massacre, Mitchell Johnson were tried a juveniles and were released from prison when they were 21 years old.
Marina Golub	1957	2012	54 years	Russian	actress	car		Moscow, Russia	
Julia Gomelskaya	1964	2016	52 years	Ukrainian	composer	car		Odesa Oblast, Ukraine	Lost control and crashed.
Miguel Alfredo González	1983	2017	34 years	Cuban	baseball player	car		Havana, Cuba	
Bailey Goss	1912	1962	49 years	American	sports announcer	car		Baltimore, Maryland, U.S.	Rear-ended a tractor-trailer that was stopped at a traffic light
Abderrahim Goumri	1976	2013	36 years	Moroccan	runner	car		Temara, Morocco	
Dražen Gović	1981	2022	40 years	Croatian	footballer	car		near Šibenik, Croatia	Both occupants of the vehicle, including Gović died.
Charlie Grant	1874	1932	57 years	American	baseball player	stationary		Cincinnati, Ohio, US	He was sitting on the steps of a building when a passing car suffered a tire blowout, jumped the curb and struck him.
Earl Grant	1931	1970	39 years	American	pianist	car		Interstate 10, Lordsburg, New Mexico, US	
Kirby Grant	1911	1985	73 years	American	actor	car		west of Titusville, Florida, US	He swerved to avoid a collision and crashed into a water-filled ditch throwing him out of the vehicle, all while trying to pass two vehicles.
Earle Graser	1909	1941	32 years	Canadian	actor	car		Farmington, Michigan, US	Presumed to have fallen asleep at the wheel while driving to WXYZ's studios (where The Lone Ranger was produced).
Eddie Griffin	1982	2007	25 years	American	basketball player	SUV		Houston, Texas, US	He ignored a railroad warning and went through a barrier before striking a moving train.
David Griggs	1967	1995	28 years	American	American football player	car		Fort Lauderdale, Florida, US	Collision with billboard.
Patrick Grimlund	1972	2023	50 years	Swedish	television presenter	car		outside Mariefred, Sweden	died from injuries after a crash between a car and a truck on country road 990.
Timo Grönlund	1954	2022	68 years	Finnish	sprint canoer			Pälkäne, Finland	
Dovid Grossman	1946	2018	71–72 years	American	rabbi	motorcycle		Staten Island, New York, US	
Herta Groves	1920	2016	96 years	Austrian/British	hat maker	pedestrian		London, UK	Groves was struck by a truck while leaving a function.
Nicolas Grunitzky	1913	1969	56 years	Togolese	exiled President of Togo	car		Ivory Coast	
Slađa Guduraš	1987	2014	27 years	Bosnian	pop singer and bit actress	car	Volkswagen Golf	Sremska Mitrovica, Serbia	Died in a crash while en route to Belgrade. She was reported missing, but then her body and damaged vehicle were found six days after her death.
Aurel Guga	1898	1936	38 years	Romanian	footballer	car		Timișoara, Romania	
Eduard Gutiérrez	1995	2017	21 years	Colombian	footballer	car		Garzón, Colombia	
Arthur Guyton	1919	2003	83 years	American	physiologist	car		Jackson, Mississippi, US	

== H ==
Name	Birth	Death	Aged	Nationality	Notability	Mode of transport	Vehicle	Crash location	Details
Paul Hackman	1953	1992	38 years	Canadian	musician (Helix)	van		near Kamloops, British Columbia, Canada	Van belonging to Helix, Hackman's band, veered off-road and fell down embankment.
Glenn Hackney	1924	2022	98 years	American	politician	car			died from injuries sustained in a serious traffic crash.
Roger Hagberg	1939	1970	31 years	American	football player (running back)	car		Lafayette, California, US	
Nelson Haggerty	1973	2021	47 years	American	basketball coach and former college basketball player	car		Wise County, Texas, US	
Roger Hägglund	1961	1992	30 years	Swedish	ice hockey player	car		Sweden	
Nagare Hagiwara	1953	2015	62 years	Japanese	actor	motorcycle		Suginami, Tokyo	
Jörg Haider	1950	2008	58 years	Austrian	politician, Governor of Carinthia	car	Volkswagen Phaeton	near Köttmannsdorf, Carinthia, Austria	Car veered off-road and fell down embankment.
Mike Hailwood	1940	1981	40 years	British	motorcycle racer	car	Rover SD1	A435 Alcester Road, near Tanworth-in-Arden, Warwickshire, England, United Kingdom	Collision with truck. Hailwood's daughter Michelle was also killed.
George Hainsworth	1893	1950	57 years	Canadian	ice hockey player	car		Gravenhurst, Ontario, Canada	Head-on collision with truck.
Veikko Hakulinen	1925	2003	78 years	Finnish	skier	pedestrian		Valkeakoski, Finland	Hit by a car.
David Halberstam	1934	2007	73 years	American	Pulitzer Prize-winning journalist	car	Toyota Camry	California State Route 84 at Menlo Park, California, US, near the Dumbarton Bridge	Collision with car. Kevin Jones, Halberstam's assistant, was the driver.
Tibor Halgas	1981	2020	38 years	Hungarian	footballer	car		Budapest, Hungary	
Freddy Hall	1985	2022	37 years	Bermudian	footballer	car		St. George's, Bermuda	
Mike Hall	1981	2017	35 years	British	cyclist and race organizer	car		Canberra, Australia	
Charles Hallahan	1943	1997	54 years	American	actor	car		Los Angeles, California, US	
Bianca Halstead	1965	2001	36 years	American	rock musician (Betty Blowtorch)	car (passenger)		New Orleans, Louisiana, US	She was killed in a car crash when she accepted a ride from a drunk driver.
Dorothy Cann Hamilton	1949	2016	67 years	American	chef and businesswoman	car		Litchfield County, Connecticut, US	
William Hamilton	1939	2016	76 years	American	cartoonist	car		Lexington, Kentucky, US	Drove his car through a stop sign and was struck by a pickup truck.
Mike Hammond	1990	2023	33 years	British	ice hockey player	car		Shawnigan Lake, British Columbia, Canada	Hammond was involved in a single vehicle collision and died from his injuries.
Paul Hampshire	1981	2022	40 years	Scottish	footballer	pedestrian			Died from injuries sustained after a car hit him.
Josh Hancock	1978	2007	29 years	American	baseball player	car	2007 Ford Explorer	St. Louis, Missouri, US	Collision with truck. Hancock was twice over the drink-drive limit.
Steven Hancock	1957	2016	58 years	British	sprint canoer	bicycle		Mississauga, Ontario, Canada	Collision with car.
Rufus Hannah	1954	2017	63 years	American	advocate (homeless rights)	car		Swainsboro, Georgia, US	
Mary Hansen	1966	2002	36 years	Australian	vocalist with Stereolab	bicycle		London, United Kingdom	Crushed to death by truck.
Baba Hardev Singh	1954	2016	62 years	Indian	spiritual guru	car		Beauharnois, Quebec, Canada	
Gus Hardin	1945	1996	50 years	American	country music singer	car		Salina, Oklahoma, US	
Nandamuri Harikrishna	1956	2018	61 years	Indian	actor and politician	car	Toyota Fortuner	near Narketpally, India	He turned his face to grab a water bottle and crashed into a road median. He was not seat-belted, and died then and there.
Abdalelah Haroun	1997	2021	24 years	Qatari	track and field sprinter	car		Doha, Qatar	
Aaron Harper	1981	2023	42 years	American	basketball player	car		Mississippi, US	Harper's car left the highway and rolled multiple times.
Joi Harris	1976	2017	40 years	American	motorcycle racer and stunt woman	motorcycle		Vancouver, British Columbia, Canada	
Kylie Rae Harris	1989	2019	30 years	American	country music singer	car		Taos, New Mexico, US	Speeding and drunk driving contributed to Harris's fatal car crash.
Chris Hartje	1915	1946	31 years	American	baseball player	bus		Snoqualmie Pass Highway (US 10), Washington, US	Passenger in a bus carrying the Spokane Indians baseball team, which swerved to avoid a wrong-way driver and plunged 300–500 feet down a mountainside. Hartje and eight of his teammates were killed. He was burned severely and died two days after the crash.
Sajjadul Hasan	1978	2007	28 years	Bangladeshi	cricketer	motorcycle		Bangladesh	
Dwayne Haskins	1997	2022	24 years	American	football player	pedestrian		Florida, United States	Haskins was walking on a South Florida highway when he was struck by a dump truck in the early hours of the morning. Haskins was pronounced dead at the scene.
Ahmed Hassanein	1889	1946	56 years	Egyptian	political advisor, writer, and sportsman	car		Egypt	Collision with British military vehicle.
Ernst-Paul Hasselbach	1966	2008	42 years	Dutch	television host and producer	car		Lom, Norway	
Michael Hastings	1980	2013	33 years	American	journalist	car	Mercedes C250 Coupé	Los Angeles, California, US	Car collided with a tree.
Darcy Haugan		2018	42 years	Canadian	hockey coach and general manager (member of Humboldt Broncos)	bus (passenger)		Saskatchewan, Canada	Haugan was riding in a bus when it collided with a semi-trailer truck.
Mike Hawthorn	1929	1959	29 years	British	racing driver	car	Jaguar Mark 1	A3 near Guildford, England, United Kingdom	Collision with tree.
D.J. Hayden	1990	2023	33 years	American	football player	car (passenger)	Acura SUV	Houston, Texas, US	Hayden was among six killed in a crash that also killed two of his former college teammates. A Chrysler 300 reportedly ran a red light colliding with the vehicle Hayden was in.
Nicky Hayden	1981	2017	35 years	American	motorcycle racer	bicycle	S-Works Venge	Cesena, Italy	Car driver drove at 43 mph on a 30 mph zone. Neither driver nor Hayden braked when the pair collided.
Victor Hayden, also known as "The Mascara Snake"	1948	2018	70 years	American	painter and musician	pedestrian			Hayden died from complications after being struck by a van.
Brian Hebditch	1948	2023	75 years	British	sports shooter	pedestrian		Titchfield, England	Hebditch was hit by a lorry outside a garden centre.
Anne Heche	1969	2022	53 years	American	actress	car	Mini Cooper	Los Angeles, US	Heche crashed her car into a house. The following week, relatives said she was not expected to survive and organ donation was being considered. Her life support was later switched off.
Kurt Hector	1972	2013	41 years	Dominican	football team manager	car		Pont Cassé, Dominica	
Michael Hedges	1953	1997	43 years	American	musician	car	BMW	State Route 128, near Boonville, California, US	Car veered off-road and fell down embankment.
Jo Henderson	1934	1988	54 years	American	actress	car		Chinle, Arizona, US	
Conrad Hendricks	1979	2006	27 years	South African	footballer	car		near Johannesburg, South Africa	
Chris Henry	1983	2009	26 years	American	football player	pick-up truck		near Charlotte, North Carolina, US	Fell out of pick-up truck window.
Steve Henry	1957	2021	64 years	American	football player	pickup truck		Emporia, Kansas, US	He was rear-ended by a reckless driver who was fleeing police.
Stefan Henze	1981	2016	35 years	German	slalom canoeist	taxi (passenger)		Rio de Janeiro, Brazil	Taxi in which he was riding crashed on August 12, 2016, during the 2016 Summer Olympics. Henze died of his injuries three days later.
Bob Herbert	1942	1999	57 years	British	talent manager	car	MG F	Windsor Great Park, Berkshire, England, United Kingdom	Collision with fence.
Jon Hernandez	1969	1993	24 years	Filipino	actor	van (passenger)		Quezon City, Philippines	Hernandez was a passenger in a van when it collided with another vehicle.
Billy Herrington	1969	2018	48 years	American	pornographic actor	car		Palm Springs, California, US	
Ian Hibell	1934	2008	74 years	British	cyclist	bicycle		Athens, Salonika, Greece	
Bertha Hill	1905	1950	45 years	American	blues singer	pedestrian		New York City, US	She died in a hit and run incident.
Jayson Hinder	1965	2017	51 years	Australian	lawyer and politician	motorcycle			
Harris Hines	1943	2018	75 years	American	judge	car		Atlanta, Georgia, United States	
Shahnaz Himmeti		2013		Afghan	politician	car			
Brian Hitchen	1936	2013	77 years	British	newspaper editor	pedestrian		Altea, Spain	Struck by car while crossing the road. His wife was also killed.
Ivan Hlinka	1950	2004	54 years	Czech	ice hockey player	car		near Karlovy Vary, Czech Republic	Collision with truck.
Heinz Hofer	1943	1977	34 years	Swiss	racing team manager and mechanic	car	Ferrari Berlinetta Boxer	A27, near Portsmouth, England	Collision with another vehicle. Car belonged to Roger Penske, whom he was helping to deliver the car to the United States.
Marty Hogan	1869	1923	53 years	American	baseball player	car		Youngstown, Ohio, US	Died of injuries received in crash.
Patrick Hogan	1891	1936	45 years	Irish	politician	car		Aughrim, County Galway, Ireland	
Honey Sri-Isan	1970	1992	21 years	Thai	Singer	car		Sisaket	
John Holliman	1948	1998	49 years	American	CNN reporter	car		Atlanta	Holliman died in a head-on collision near his home in suburban Atlanta.
Ben Hollioake	1977	2002	24 years	English	cricketer	car	Porsche 968 convertible	Kwinana Freeway, Perth, Australia	Collision with wall.
Richard Holmlund	1963	2011	47 years	Swedish	football manager	car		Örebro, Sweden	
Dick Hoover	1925	1981	55 years	American	baseball pitcher	car		Lake Placid, Florida, US	
Johnny Horton	1925	1960	35 years	American	country and rockabilly musician and singer	car	Cadillac	near Milano, Texas, US	Car collided with a truck on a bridge.
Tim Horton	1930	1974	44 years	Canadian	ice hockey player	car	De Tomaso Pantera	Queen Elizabeth Way at crossing of Twelve Mile Creek, Ontario, Canada	Car collided with culvert, throwing Horton out.
Dean Horrix	1961	1990	28 years	English	footballer	car		Berkshire, England	His wife survived the crash.
Melissa Hoskins	1991	2023	32 years	Australian	cyclist	pedestrian		Adelaide, Australia	Hoskins was hit by a vehicle allegedly driven by her husband, fellow Australian representative cyclist Rohan Dennis
Mohammad-Ali Hosseinzadeh	1977	2016	39 years	Iranian	politician	car	Peugeot Pars	Qazvin–Zanjan road 63 km, Iran	
Kaylee Hottle	2008	2026	18 years	American	actress	car		Ijamsville, Maryland, United States	
Jim House	1948	2018	70 years	American	Democratic politician	tractor on his farm		Washington County, Arkansas, United States	
Peter Houseman	1945	1977	31 years	English	footballer	car		near Oxford, England	His wife and two friends were also killed.
Thomas Howard	1983	2013	30 years	American	football player	car		Oakland, California, US	
Steve Howe	1958	2006	48 years	American	baseball pitcher	pickup truck		Interstate 10, Coachella, California, US	Howe's pickup truck rolled over on the westbound side of the highway.
E. Philip Howrey	1937	2011	73 years	American	economist	bicycle	truck	Boulder, Colorado, US	Howrey was killed in a collision with a dump truck.
Beatrice Hsu	1978	2007	28 years	Taiwanese	actress	car	Mini Cooper	National Highway No. 1 near Taichung, Taiwan	Car collided with central reservation and then with a truck.
Huang Wenpan	1995	2018	22 years	Chinese	swimmer	car		Hongya County, Sichuan, China	
Allan Hubbard	1928	2011	83 years	New Zealander	businessman, financier	car		Oamaru, New Zealand	Car in which he was passenger collided with another vehicle.
Carl Hubbell	1903	1988	85 years	American	baseball player	car		Scottsdale, Arizona, US	
John Hugenholtz	1914	1995	80 years	Dutch	race circuit designer	car		Zandvoort, Netherlands	His wife died instantly; he died later of his injuries.
Emil Huhn	1892	1925	33 years	American	baseball player and manager	car		Camden, South Carolina, US	While driving six of his players back from an away game, Huhn lost control of his car on a curve and overturned into a ditch. Huhn was killed instantly; his front-seat passenger, catcher Frank Reiger, died shortly thereafter. The remaining five passengers were injured.
Ralph Hunt	1933	1964	31 years	English	footballer	passenger		Grantham, England	Crash occurred on the return journey to watch future opponents Peterborough United with teammates Peter Stringfellow (who was driving), Ron Powell and Doug Wragg.
Troy Hurtubise	1963	2018	54 years	Canadian	inventor and conservationist	car		North Bay, Ontario, Canada	
Andriy Husin	1972	2014	41 years	Ukrainian	football	motorcycle		Kyiv, Ukraine	
James Hylton	1934	2018	83 years	American	former NASCAR driver	car		near Carnesville, Georgia, US	Hylton and his son died when their vehicle left the road.

== I ==
Name	Birth	Death	Aged	Nationality	Notability	Mode of transport	Vehicle	Crash location	Details
Ovidiu Iacov	1981	2001	20 years	Romanian	footballer	car	Volkswagen	Târgoviște, Romania	He was driving while drunk.
Jay Ilagan	1955	1992	36 years	Filipino	actor	motorcycle		Quezon City, Philippines	Ilagan was killed on a motorbike.
Vladislav Illich-Svitych	1934	1966	31 years	Soviet	linguist, establisher of Nostratic hypothesis	pedestrian		Zagoryanka train station, Schelkovo, Moscow region, Russia	Hit by Volga 21 car, possibly KGB assassination.
Nadezhda Ilyina	1949	2013	64 years	Russian	track and field athlete	car		Moscow, Russia	
Masada Iosefa	1988	2021	32 years	Samoan	rugby league player	quad bike		Darwin, Northern Territory, Australia	
Sana Iqbal	1987	2017	29 years	Indian	cyclist and anti-suicide activist	car		Outer Ring Road, Hyderabad, India	
Mohammad Irfan	1951	2016	64 years	Indian	politician	car		Budaun, Uttar Pradesh, India	
Satoshi Iriki	1967	2023	55 years	Japanese	baseball player	car		Miyakonojō, Japan	
Charlie Irwin	1869	1925	56 years	American	baseball player	pedestrian		Chicago, Illinois, US	Hit by a bus.
Vernon Isley	1942	1955	13 years	American	singer and original member of The Isley Brothers	bicycle		Cincinnati, Ohio, US	His bicycle was struck by a car near his home.
Ted Itani	1939	2021	81 years	Canadian	military officer and humanitarian	pedestrian		Canada	He was hospitalized in January 2021 after being struck in the head by a bus while running. He died in the hospital two months later.
Festus Iyayi	1947	2013	66 years	Nigerian	writer	car		Kano, Nigeria	

== J ==
Name	Birth	Death	Aged	Nationality	Notability	Mode of transport	Vehicle	Crash location	Details
James Jabara	1923	1966	43 years	American	U.S. Air Force jet ace	car (passenger)		Delray Beach, Florida, US	While on leave, he and his daughter were traveling with family when the car crashed, killing James and his daughter.
Edwin Jackson	1991	2018	26 years	American	football player (linebacker)	pedestrian		Indianapolis, Indiana, US	He exited the car of an Uber driver and was hit from the side of the road by a pickup truck where the driver was fleeing a crime scene.
Khyree Jackson	1999	2024	24 years	American	professional football player	car (passenger)	Dodge Charger	Upper Marlboro, Maryland, US	Jackson, alongside two others, were killed in the crash.
Michael Jackson	1969	2017	48 years	American	football player (wide receiver)	motorcycle		Tangipahoa, Louisiana, US	
Tarvaris Jackson	1983	2020	36 years	American	football player	car	Chevrolet Camaro	Pike Road, Alabama, US	He drifted off the road, struck a tree and flipped while driving 70 mph in a 30-mile zone.
Rosamond Jacob	1888	1960	71 years	Irish	writer, activist	pedestrian		Dublin	She was struck by a car while walking in Dublin and died two weeks later in hospital.
Jadiel	1985	2014	28 years	Puerto Rican	reggaeton singer	motorcycle		Rochester, New York, US	Riding his new motorcycle that his brother got him, Jadiel (whose birth name is Ramón Alberto González Adams) lost control of it, veered into oncoming traffic and collided with a car. He later died in the hospital.
Sinethemba Jantjie	1989	2019	30 years	South African	footballer	car		Bethlehem, South Africa	
Helmut Jahn	1940	2021	81 years	German-American	architect	bicycle		Campton Hills, Illinois, US	Jahn rode through a stop sign and was struck by two vehicles.
Randall Jarrell	1914	1965	51 years	American	poet	pedestrian		Chapel Hill, North Carolina, US	Jarrell was hit by a car alongside U.S. Highway 15–501 on October 14, 1965, during dusk.
Paul Jarrico	1915	1997	82 years	American	screenwriter	car		Los Angeles, California, US	
Jhon Jarrín	1961	2021	59 years	Ecuadorian	track cyclist	bicycle		Cuenca, Ecuador	He was hit by a car and died from his injuries shortly after.
Andrew Jenkins	1885	1957	71 years	American	country and folk composer, preacher	car		Thomaston, Georgia, US	
Claudia Jennings	1949	1979	29 years	American	model and Playboy Playmate	car	Volkswagen Beetle	Malibu, California, US	
Anton Jeyanathan	1948	2016	68 years	Tamil	Politician	motorcycle		Mullaitivu District, Sri Lanka	
Arvin "Tado" Jimenez	1974	2014	39 years	Filipino	comedian	bus (passenger)	Nissan Diesel RB46S (DMMC Aero Adamant)	Bontoc, Mountain Province, Philippines	Jimenez died in a crash while riding a bus in Barangay Talubin, Bontoc, Mountain Province. He was among the 14 people killed in the crash.
Ryan Jimmo	1981	2016	34 years	Canadian	mixed martial artist	pedestrian		Edmonton, Alberta, Canada	Got into an altercation with the occupants of a truck in a parking lot. As he walked away, the truck ran him down. Two men faced serious charges over the incident.
Prince Ital Joe	1963	2001	38 years	Dominican-American	reggae musician	car		Phoenix, Arizona, US	Died en route to Los Angeles, California.
Jan Johansson	1931	1968	37 years	Swedish	jazz musician	car		Sollentuna, Sweden	Johansson was on his way to perform in Jönköping, Sweden when the fatal car crash occurred.
Jack Johnson	1878	1946	68 years	American	boxer	car		Franklinton, North Carolina, US	
James Weldon Johnson	1871	1938	67 years	American	lawyer and civil rights advocate	car		Wiscasset, Maine, US	Crash happened on level crossing.
Jing Johnson	1894	1950	56 years	American	baseball player	car		Pottstown, Pennsylvania, US	
Kenneth Jones	1952	1969	16 years	American	songwriter	car			Jones was killed in an automobile crash.
Ray Jones	1988	2007	18 years	English	footballer	car (passenger)	Volkswagen Golf	East Ham, London	Vehicle collided with bus.
Diogo Jota	1996	2025	28 years	Portuguese	footballer	car	Lamborghini Aventador	Cernadilla, Spain	His brother, André Silva, also died in the same crash.
Juanito	1954	1992	37 years	Spanish	footballer	car		Calzada de Oropesa, Toledo, Spain	He died in a road crash while returning to Mérida, Spain.
Nathaël Julan	1996	2020	23 years	French	footballer	car	Audi Q5	Pordic, France	
Ismail Juma	1991	2017	26 years	Tanzanian	long-distance runner	motorcycle			
Jung Yong-hoon	1979	2003	24 years	South Korean	footballer	car		Seoul, South Korea	
Junkyard Dog	1952	1998	45 years	American	professional wrestler	car		Interstate 20, near Forest, Mississippi, US	

== K ==
Name	Birth	Death	Aged	Nationality	Notability	Mode of transport	Vehicle	Crash location	Details
Toshitami Kaihara	1933	2014	81 years	Japanese	former Governor of Hyōgo	car		Port Island, Chuo-ku, Kobe, Japan	His car collided with another car on the left side, and the former governor died from a traumatic aortic injury.
Domagoj Kapec	1989	2008	18 years	Croatian	ice hockey player	car		Zagreb, Croatia	
Aleksandr Karakin	1991	2023	32 years	Russian	footballer	car		Moscow, Russia	
Pavel Karelin	1990	2011	21 years	Russian	ski jumper	car		Nizhny Novgorod, Russia	
Jonathan Kaufer	1955	2013	58 years	American	director and writer	car		Las Vegas, Nevada, US	
Sagardeep Kaur	1981	2016	35 years	Indian	athlete	car		Haryana, India	
Darwood Kaye	1929	2002	72 years	American	Our Gang actor	pedestrian		Riverside, California, US	He was severely injured in a hit-and-run on May 15, 2002, and died from injuries that same evening.
Gerry Kearby	1947	2012	65 years	American	businessman	car		Pescadero, California, US	
Grace Kelly	1929	1982	52 years	American	Actress, Princess of Monaco	car	1971 Rover P6 3500	Route de la Turbie, between Mont Agel and Monaco	Kelly suffered a stroke while driving, lost control of car which veered off-road, overturned and plunged down a 120 ft. mountainside road. She survived the crash, but died from her injuries the following night in a Monaco Hospital. Her passenger, daughter Princess Stéphanie, survived the crash.
Tim Kelly	1963	1998	35 years	American	guitarist for rock band Slaughter	car		Bagdad, Arizona, US	He was hit by an 18-wheeler on Highway 96, whose driver was found to have been driving under the influence, and sentenced to prison in result.
Mose Kelsch	1897	1935	38 years	American	football player	car		Pittsburgh, Pennsylvania, US	
Kemistry	1963	1999	35 years	English	DJ	car (passenger)		Hampshire, England, United Kingdom	Olusanya died when her car was travelling behind a van on the M3 motorway. She was hit by the steel body of a cat's eye, which had been dislodged by the van and flew through the windscreen of the car in which she was a passenger. The cat's eye hit Olusanya in the face and she was killed instantly.
Hal Kemp	1904	1940	36 years	American	bandleader	car		Madera, California, US	On December 19, while Kemp was driving from Los Angeles to San Francisco, he got into a head-on collision with a truck, resulting in several broken ribs and a punctured lung. He developed pneumonia while in the hospital recovering, and died two days later.
Nic Kerdiles	1994	2023	29 years	American	hockey player	motorcycle		Nashville, Tennessee, US	
Neil Kerley	1934	2022	88 years	Australian	footballer	car		Walker Flat, Australia	
John Kezdy		2023	64 years	American	punk singer	bicycle		Glencoe, Illinois, US	Kezdy collided with a parked Amazon delivery van that was illegally stopped in the bike lane.
Valeri Kharlamov	1948	1981	33 years	Russian	ice hockey player	car		Solnechnogorsky District, Russian SFSR, Soviet Union (now Russia)	Valeri and his wife Irina died in a crash on the busy highway between Moscow and St. Petersburg.
Papi Khomane	1975	2023	48 years	South African	footballer	car			Khomane and his mother were killed in a collision en route to a funeral taking place in Kwalazulu-Natal, South Africa.
Anatoly Khrapaty	1962	2008	45 years	Russian	weightlifter	motorcycle		Arshaly, Kazakhstan	
Gour Khyapa	1947	2013	65 years	Indian	singer	car		West Bengal, India	
Desiet Kidane	2000	2021	21 years	Eritrean	racing cyclist	bicycle		Asmara, Eritrea	Hit by a car while training.
Johnny Kidd	1935	1966	30 years	British	rock and roll singer for Johnny Kidd & The Pirates	car		Bury, England, United Kingdom	
Terrence Kiel	1980	2008	27 years	American	football player	car	Chevy Sedan	San Diego, California, US	Kiel was driving alone in San Diego's upscale Scripps Ranch neighborhood when he hit a wall and was thrown from his car. Police said he was barely breathing when paramedics got to him and he died about an hour later.
Witold Kiełtyka	1984	2007	23 years	Polish	death metal drummer	bus (passenger)		Novozybkov, Russia	
Ken Kifer	1945	2003	57 years	American	writer, bicyclist and webmaster	bicycle		6 miles (9.7 km) from his home near Scottsboro, Alabama, US	Kifer was struck and killed by a serial drunk driver. He was taken to the hospital where he died the next morning.
Killer Kau	1998	2021	23 years	South African	rapper	car		South Africa	
Kim Hyun-jun	1960	1999	39 years	South Korean	basketball player	car		Seongnam, South Korea	
Kim Joo-hyuk	1972	2017	45 years	South Korean	actor	car		Samseong-dong, Gangnam-gu, Seoul	Kim was riding in a car when it around 16:30 KST when it collided with another vehicle.
Kim Min-woo	1986	2007	21 years	South Korean	ice dancer	car		Seoul, South Korea	
Sam Kinison	1953	1992	38 years	American	comedian and actor	car	1989 Pontiac Trans Am	west of Needles, California, US	He was traveling on U.S. Route 95, four miles (6 km) north of Interstate 40 to perform at a sold-out show in Laughlin, Nevada, when a drunk 17-year-old pickup driver crossed the center line of the roadway, went into Kinison's lane, and struck him head-on. Kinison died at the scene.
Michael King	1945	2004	58 years	New Zealander	historian	car		near Maramarua, New Zealand	Crash occurred on New Zealand State Highway 2 when he hit a tree.
Stephen Kipkorir	1970	2008	37 years	Kenyan	Olympic athlete	military vehicle			Kipkorir was a professional soldier and died in a military vehicle while on manoeuvres
Kelvin Kiptum	1999	2024	24 years	Kenyan	marathon runner (World Record holder)	car		Kaptagat, Kenya	His coach Gervais Hakizimana also died in the crash.
Andy Kirby	1961	2002	40 years	American	NASCAR driver	motorcycle		White House, Tennessee, US	He was killed in a motorcycle crash in his hometown.
Eddie Kirkland	1923	2011	87 years	American	electric blues musician	car	1998 Ford Taurus	Crystal River, Florida, US	A bus hit him while he was attempting to make a U-turn.
Bob Klinger	1908	1977	69 years	American	baseball pitcher	car		Villa Ridge, Missouri, US	
Greg Knapp	1963	2021	58 years	American	football coach	bicycle		San Ramon, California, US	He was hit by a car while bicycling and died five days later in a hospital in Walnut Creek, California.
Rolf Knierim	1928	2018	90 years	German	biblical scholar	car		Arizona, US	
Hugo Koblet	1925	1964	39 years	Swiss	champion cyclist	car		Egg, Canton of Zurich, Switzerland	Koblet died days after a car crash, with speculation that his death may have been suicide.
Rudi Koertzen	1949	2022	73 years	South African	cricket umpire	car		Riversdale, Western Cape, South Africa	
Nkosiphendule Kolisile	1973	2013	40 years	South African	politician	car			
Lou Kolls	1896	1941	48 years	American	baseball umpire	car		Hooppole, Illinois, US	
Serapion Kolosnitsin	1964	2025	60 years	Russian	orthodox prelate	car (passenger)		M12 highway near Pilna, Russia	Kolosnitsin died at the scene after the vehicle he was a passenger in crashed
Amalie Konsa	1873	1949	76 years	Estonian	stage and film actress	bus (passenger)		Tartu, Estonia	
Mary Jo Kopechne	1940	1969	28 years	American	passenger of U.S. Senator Edward M. "Ted" Kennedy	car (passenger)	1967 Oldsmobile Delmont 88	Chappaquiddick Island, Massachusetts, US	Ted Kennedy drove the car off a narrow, unlit bridge, which lacked guardrails. The Oldsmobile landed in Poucha Pond and overturned in the water; Kennedy extricated himself from the vehicle and survived, but Kopechne did not.
Artem Kopot	1972	1992	19 years	Russian	ice hockey player	car		Chelyabinsk, Russia	He was driving alone at the time of the fatal car crash.
Adam Koppy	1973	2013	40 years	American	mechanical engineer	car		Dowagiac, Cass County, Michigan, US	
Radivoj Korać	1938	1969	30 years	Serbian (Yugoslav)	basketball player	car		Sarajevo, SR Bosnia And Herzegovina	
Cornelis H. A. Koster	1943	2013	69 years	Dutch	computer scientist	motorcycle			
Nikola Kotkov	1938	1971	32 years	Bulgarian	footballer (striker)	car		Sofia, Bulgaria	Kotkov died along with his friend and teammate Georgi Asparuhov in a traffic crash in the Vitinya Pass of the Balkan Mountains, en route to Vratsa.
Ernie Kovacs	1919	1962	42 years	American	comedian, actor, and writer	car	Chevrolet Corvair station wagon	Los Angeles, California, US	The crash occurred in the early morning hours. Kovacs, who had worked for much of the evening, met his wife Edie Adams at a baby shower for Milton Berle and his wife, who had recently adopted a newborn baby boy. The couple left the party in separate cars. After a light rainstorm, Kovacs lost control of his car while turning fast and crashed into a power pole at the corner of Beverly Glen and Santa Monica Boulevards. He was thrown halfway out the passenger side, dying almost instantly from chest and head injuries.
Sammi Kane Kraft	1992	2012	20 years	American	actress	car		Los Angeles, California, US	Was riding passenger in the car when it rear-ended a semi trailer and was then struck by another vehicle.
Dennis Kramer	1992	2023	31 years	German-American	basketball player	car		Barterode, Germany	
Philip Taylor Kramer	1952	1995	42 years	American	bass guitarist for rock band Iron Butterfly	minivan	1993 green Ford Aerostar	near Malibu, California, US	On February 12, 1995, Kramer drove to Los Angeles International Airport to pick up an investor and his wife. He spent forty-five minutes at the airport but failed to meet them. Kramer did make a flurry of cell phone calls, including one to the police during which he said, "I am Philip Taylor Kramer, and I'm going to kill myself." He was never heard from again. This led to a massive search, many news reports, and talk show segments. An article in Skeptic reported numerous conspiracy theories about his death. On May 29, 1999, Kramer's minivan and skeletal remains were found by photographers looking for old car wrecks to shoot at the bottom of Decker Canyon near Malibu, California. Based on forensic evidence and Kramer's emergency call to the police, authorities ruled his death as a probable suicide committed on the day on which he was last heard.
Harry Krause	1888	1940	52 years	American	baseball player	car		San Francisco, California, US	
Marek Krejčí	1980	2007	26 years	Slovak	footballer	car	Audi S3	near Maitenbeth, Bavaria, Germany	He lost control of his vehicle while driving to Burghausen, Altötting, Germany on the B12 road. Car swung off the road and into a tree, trapping him. The fire brigade could not save him in time.
Trent Kresse	1966	1986	22 years	Canadian	ice hockey player	bus		Saskatchewan Highway 1, Canada	The crash killed three other teammates.
Robert Kroetsch	1927	2011	83 years	Canadian	novelist and poet	car		Alberta, Canada	
Richard Kröll	1968	1996	28 years	Austrian	alpine skier	car		Zillertal road (B 169), Austria	He hit a German bus on a wet road head and died at the scene.
Jamilia Ksiksi	1968	2022	54 years	Tunisian	politician			near Sfax, Tunisia	Killed in a road crash on an express road near the city of Sfax.
Juscelino Kubitschek	1902	1976	73 years	Brazilian	former president	car		near Resende, Rio de Janeiro, Brazil	
Evgeny Kucherevsky	1941	2006	65 years	Ukrainian	football coach	car	Mercedes-Benz	Dnipropetrovsk, Ukraine	Kucherevskyi's car suffered a head-on collision with a KAMAZ truck.
Besik Kudukhov	1986	2013	27 years	Russian	wrestler	car		Krasnodar Krai, Russia	Collided with a truck.
Janusz Kulig	1969	2004	35 years	Polish	rally driver	car	Fiat Stilo	Rzezawa, Poland	Kulig died after his car collided with a train on a level crossing. The crossing barriers were not lowered.
Kalia Kulothungan	1977	2018	40 years	Indian	footballer	bike		Thanjavur, Tamil Nadu, India	
Igor Kurnosov	1985	2013	28 years	Russian	chess grandmaster	car		Chelyabinsk, Russia	
Atsushi Kuroi	1969	2010	40 years	Japanese	professional drifting driver	motorcycle		Osaka, Japan	Kuroi was hit by another vehicle while travelling home from work on his motorcycle and later died in the hospital after bleeding to death from injuries to his thigh.
Andriy Kuzmenko	1968	2015	46 years	Ukrainian	singer for rock band Skryabin	car	Toyota Sequoia	Kryvyi Rih, Ukraine	
Vladimir Kuzmichyov	1979	2016	37 years	Russian	footballer	car		Moscow, Russia	Crash occurred on the highway.
Kwon Ri-se	1991	2014	23 years	Korean / Japanese	singer (member of Ladies' Code)	van		Suwon, Gyeonggi-do, South Korea	
Doug Kyle	1932	2023	91 years	Canadian	olympic runner	car	Chevrolet Spark	Calgary, Alberta, Canada	Kyle was involved in a single-vehicle rollover crash that caused injuries that he succumbed to in hospital.

== L ==
Name	Birth	Death	Aged	Nationality	Notability	Mode of transport	Vehicle	Crash location	Details
Nicolae Labiș	1935	1956	21 years	Romanian	poet	pedestrian		University Square, Bucharest, Romania	He lost his balance, caught the grille between the tram wagons, his head hit the pavement, and he was dragged a short distance.
Leah LaBelle	1986	2018	31 years	Canadian-American	R&B singer	car (passenger)	Range Rover	Studio City, California, US	While speeding, basketball player Rasual Butler lost control of the vehicle and hit a curb. The vehicle flipped, killing him and his wife LaBelle.
Scott LaFaro	1936	1961	25 years	American	jazz musician	car		Flint, New York, US	LaFaro died in a car crash in the summer of 1961
Siarhei Lahun	1988	2011	22 years	Belarusian	weightlifter	car		Novopolotsk, Belarus	
Dolores Lambaša	1981	2013	32 years	Croatian	actress	car		Slavonski Brod, Croatia	Car hit the back of another car in the morning fog on the A3 motorway at 130 km/h (80 mph). Lambaša was sleeping in the reclined front seat and was ejected from the vehicle by the force of the crash despite wearing a seatbelt and died in hospital. The driver, actor Stojan Matavulj was slightly over the BAC legal limit. The crash happened near crash sites of Toše Proeski and of actor Emir Hadžihafizbegović, who ran over two people mending a broken down car, all within the span of several years.
Davey Lambert	1969	2017	48 years	English	motorcycle racer	motorcycle		Aintree, Liverpool, England, United Kingdom	
Marion Lambert	1943	2016	73 years		art collector	pedestrian		London, United Kingdom	Struck by bus on Oxford Street
Martin Lamble	1949	1969	19 years	British	drummer for British folk rock band, Fairport Convention	van		Birmingham, England, United Kingdom	Crashed on the M1 motorway on the way home from a gig at Mothers, a club in Birmingham.
Mark Langford	1964	2007	42 years	British	controversial company director of The Accident Group	car	Opel Corsa	Marbella, Spain	Langford died when his car left the road.
Álvaro Lara	1984	2011	26 years	Chilean	footballer	car		San Javier, Chile	
Braulio Lara	1988	2019	30 years	Dominican	baseball player (pitcher)	car		Baní, Dominican Republic	
Bob Laraba	1933	1962	28 years	American	football player (linebacker)	car		San Diego, California, US	
Joseba Larrinaga	1968	2013	45 years	Spanish	paralympic athlete	bicycle		Aramaio, Álava, Spain	He was struck by a car while riding his bicycle.
Nick Lashaway	1988	2016	28 years	American	actor	car		Framingham, Massachusetts, US	
Billy Laughlin	1932	1948	16 years	American	child actor; part of "Our Gang"	scooter		La Puente, California, US	A speeding truck struck him while he was delivering newspapers.
T. E. Lawrence	1888	1935	46 years	British	army officer	motorcycle	Brough Superior SS100	Dorset, England, United Kingdom	Lawrence was fatally injured when a dip in the road obstructed his view of two boys on their bicycles: swerving to avoid them, he lost control, and was thrown over the handlebar. He died six days later of his injuries.
Lee Eon	1981	2008	27 years	South Korean	actor	motorcycle		Hannam-dong, Seoul, South Korea	Died of a broken neck when his motorcycle collided with the guardrail of an overpass.
Steve Lee	1963	2010	47 years	Swiss	singer for hard rock band Gotthard	motorcycle		outside of Mesquite, Nevada, US	
Sauli Lehtonen	1975	1995	20 years	Finnish	tango singer	car		near Sipoo, Finland	Car (driven by his father, who survived) struck a moose on a highway. Lehtonen later died of his injuries.
Inaki Lejarreta	1983	2012	29 years	Spanish	mountain biker	car		Iurreta, Spain	
Iry LeJeune	1928	1955	26 years	American	Cajun accordionist	pedestrian		Eunice, Louisiana, US	Hit by a car while changing a tire.
Deon Lendore	1992	2022	29 years	Trinidadian	olympic sprinter	car		near College Station, Texas, United States	
Julia Lennon	1914	1958	44 years	British	mother of John Lennon	pedestrian		Menlove Avenue, Woolton, Liverpool, England, United Kingdom	While crossing Menlove Avenue to the central reservation between two traffic lanes, she was struck and killed by a Standard Vanguard car.
Kris Leonard	1996	2016	19 years	British	vocalist of the rock band Viola Beach	car (passenger)	Nissan Qashqai	Södertälje, Sweden	All four members of the band died in this crash, along with their manager. See under Craig Tarry.
Chete Lera	1949	2022	72 years	Spanish	actor	car		Rincón de la Victoria, Spain	Lera drove off the road and fell down a 50 m steep slope, landing on a plantation.
Walt Lerian	1903	1929	26 years	American	baseball player	pedestrian		Baltimore, Maryland, US	A truck jumped a curb and pinned him against a building.
Jerzy Lewi	1949	1972	23 years	Polish	chess player	car		Lund, Sweden	
Charles Lewis Jr.	1963	2009	45 years	American	businessman, promoter and entertainer	car	Ferrari 360 Challenge Stradale	Newport Beach, California, US	Lewis died in a high-speed car crash when he collided with a 1977 Porsche before hitting a light pole. It is presumed that the two vehicles were traveling alongside one another at high speed, and were most likely engaged in a "street race".
Meade Lux Lewis	1905	1964	58 years	American	composer	car	Chrysler Imperial	Minneapolis, Minnesota, US	He was rear-ended by a speeder, was pushed 300 feet (90 m), and crashed into a tree.
Jim Liberman	1945	1977	31 years	American	NHRA drag racing driver	car	1972 Corvette	West Goshen Township near West Chester, Pennsylvania, US	Liberman died in a head-on collision with a bus.
Pelle Lindbergh	1959	1985	26 years	Swedish	ice hockey goaltender	car	Porsche 930 Turbo	Somerdale, New Jersey, US	Lindbergh lost control of his car and struck a wall in front of an elementary school, critically injuring himself and severely injuring his two passengers. Although declared brain dead a few hours later, he was kept on life support until his father arrived from Sweden late the next day and his parents gave their permission to terminate treatment.
Magnus Lindgren	1982	2012	30 years	Swedish	chef	taxi		Hong Kong	
Lasse Lindroth	1972	1999	26 years	Swedish	comedian	car		Uddevalla, Sweden	
Audrey Lindvall	1982	2006	23 years	American	model	bicycle		Lee's Summit, Missouri, US	She was riding a bike near her childhood home when she hit a curb, was thrown from her bike, and fell under the rear wheels of a tanker truck carrying fuel. She died instantly when the truck rolled over her.
Jaclyn Linetsky	1986	2003	17 years	Canadian	actress	car	Dodge Grand Caravan	Saint-Césaire, Quebec, Canada	Linetsky and her 15/Love costar Vadim Schneider were killed in a collision on their way to the set.
Claudio Lippi	1970	2013	42 years	Italian	sports journalist	car		Buccinasco, Italy	
Desmond Llewelyn	1914	1999	85 years	British	actor, played Q in the James Bond movies	car	Renault Mégane	Firle, East Sussex, England, United Kingdom	Llewelyn's car collided head-on with a Fiat Bravo on the A27.
Lisa Lopes	1971	2002	30 years	American	singer with the R&B trio TLC	SUV	Mitsubishi Montero Sport	La Ceiba, Atlántida, Honduras	Lopes swerved slightly to the right then again to the left as she tried to avoid a collision with another vehicle that was in her lane. Her vehicle rolled several times after hitting two trees, throwing Lopes and three others out of the windows. She died of neck injuries and severe head trauma.
Aurelio López	1948	1992	44 years	Mexican	baseball player	car		Matehuala, San Luis Potosí, Mexico	Car overturned and he was thrown from the vehicle.
Ira Louvin	1924	1965	41 years	American	country music singer; one half of the Louvin Brothers.	car		Williamsburg, Missouri, US	Louvin was fatally injured when a drunk driver struck his car.
Slim Love	1890	1942	52 years	American	baseball pitcher	car		Memphis, Tennessee, US	
Vince Lovegrove	1947	2012	65 years	Australian	music manager (The Valentines)	car		Bangalow, New South Wales, Australia	
Linda Lovelace	1949	2002	53 years	American	actress	car		Denver, Colorado, US	She was involved in a serious automobile crash, suffering massive trauma and internal injuries. On April 22, 2002, she was taken off life support.
Tomas Lowe	1989	2016	27 years	British	bassist of the rock band Viola Beach	car (passenger)	Nissan Qashqai	Södertälje, Sweden	All four members of the band died in this crash, along with their manager. See under Craig Tarry.
Jason Lowndes	1994	2017	23 years	Australian	cyclist	bicycle	car	Bendigo, Victoria, Australia	
Bo Lozoff	1947	2012	65 years	American	writer & interfaith humanitarian	motorcycle		Puna, Hawaii, US	
Michael Lucero	1963	1998	34 years	American	music video director	car		Elko County, Nevada, US	
Mitch Lucker	1984	2012	28 years	American	frontman of metal band Suicide Silence	motorcycle	2013 Harley Davidson	Huntington Beach, California, US	Lucker's death from injuries sustained in a motorcycle crash was announced on November 1, 2012. One report stated that the crash occurred shortly after 9:00 pm on October 31.
Danny Lynch	1926	1978	52 years	American	baseball player	car		Plano, Texas, US	Collision with a cement truck.

== M ==
Name	Birth	Death	Aged	Nationality	Notability	Mode of transport	Vehicle	Crash location	Details
Alceste Madeira	1944	2021	77 years	Brazilian	politician	car (passenger)		Vila Petrolina, Caracaraí, Brazil	
Shawn Mackay	1982	2009	26 years	Australian	rugby union player	pedestrian		Durban, South Africa	Died of complications a week after being hit by an armed response vehicle while crossing the street
Peter MacGregor-Scott	1947	2017	69 years	British	film director	taxi		New York City, US	
David Macpherson, 2nd Baron Strathcarron	1924	2006	82 years	British	Peerage	motorcycle			Died from sustained injuries from a collision with dustcart seven weeks later.
Joe Mafela	1942	2017	75 years	South African	actor	car		Johannesburg, South Africa	
Patrick Mafisango	1980	2012	32 years	Rwandan	footballer	car		Dar es Salaam, Tanzania	
Magic	1975	2013	37 years	American	rapper	car		Hattiesburg, Mississippi, US	
Keith Magnuson	1947	2003	56 years	Canadian	hockey player	car	Chrysler Intrepid	Vaughan, Ontario, Canada	Killed in a crash with fellow NHL alumnus Rob Ramage behind the wheel. Ramage survived but was later found guilty of vehicular manslaughter.
Doug Magor	1947	1969	21 years	Australian	Australian rules footballer	car		Melbourne, Australia	
Jesse Mahelona	1983	2009	26 years	American	football player	car		Hawaii, US	Driving while intoxicated contributed to the fatal crash.
Aristide Maillol	1861	1944	82 years	French	artist and sculptor	car		Banyuls-sur-Mer, France	
Sigisfredo Mair	1939	1977	38 years	Italian	luger	car		Toblach, Italy	
Emmanuel Makori Nyambane		2017		Kenyan	comedian	car			Head on collision.
Junior Malanda	1994	2015	20 years	Belgian	footballer	car (passenger)	Volkswagen Touareg	near Porta Westfalica, Germany	Malanda, sitting in the back seat, had just unbuckled his seat belt to pick up a smartphone cable. The off-road vehicle in which he and two friends were sitting was travelling at 120 km/h in strong rain and heavy gusts of wind.
Stephen Malcolm	1970	2001	30 years	Jamaican	footballer	car		Duncans, Jamaica	
Gene Malin	1908	1933	25 years	American	actor	car		Venice, Los Angeles, California, US	Malin confused the gears while driving and launched his car into reverse and went off a pier into the water. He was pinned and was instantly killed.
Anna Malle	1967	2006	38 years	American	adult movie actress	car (passenger)		near Las Vegas, Nevada, US	She was a passenger in a car in which the driver made a U-turn and turned into the path of pickup truck.
Bill Malone	1924	1973	48 years	American	television and radio personality	car		Woolwich Township, New Jersey, US	Struck an overturned Greyhound bus on the New Jersey Turnpike
Sakhavat Mammadov	1953	1991	38 years	Azerbaijani	Mugham singer	car		Baku, Azerbaijan	
Dragan Mance	1962	1985	22 years	Yugoslav	footballer	car		Belgrade, Serbia	
Barry Mannakee	1947	1987	39 years	British	bodyguard and alleged lover of Diana, Princess of Wales	motorcycle (passenger)	Suzuki	Woodford, east London	
César Manrique	1919	1992	73 years	Spanish	architect	car		Tahiche, Lanzarote, Canary Islands	
Jayne Mansfield	1933	1967	34 years	American	actress	car (passenger)	1966 Buick Electra	U.S. Highway 90	En route to New Orleans, the car crashed into the rear of a tractor-trailer that had slowed down and was under-rode because of the truck spraying mosquito fogger. Mansfield, her boyfriend Sam Brody, and her driver died instantly.
Johnny Mantz	1918	1972	54 years	American	race car driver	car		Ojai, California, US	
José Manuel de la Sota	1949	2018	68 years	Argentine	politician	car		Altos Fierro, Córdoba, Argentina	
Lesley Manyathela	1981	2003	21 years	South African	footballer	car		Musina, South Africa	
Darren Manzella	1977	2013	36 years	American	gay activist	car		Pittsford, New York, US	
Garry Mapanzure	1998	2023	25 years	Zimbabwean	singer	car (passenger)		Masvingo, Zimbabwe	Mapanzure was involved in a collision that also killed his friend and his niece. It was possible that he had waited hours for an ambulance because air medical teams did not land due to issues at the Masvingo helipad.
Gary Mara	1962	2012	50 years	Australian	rugby league player	car		Los Angeles, California, US	
Niki Marangou	1948	2013	65 years	Cypriot	writer and painter	car		Fayoum, Egypt	
Jason Marcano	1983	2019	35 years	Trinidadian and Tobagonian	footballer	car		Arouca, Trinidad and Tobago	
Theo Marcuse	1920	1967	47 years	American	actor	car		Los Angeles, California, US	
Joey Marella	1963	1994	31 years	American	World Wrestling Federation referee	car		New Jersey Turnpike near Willingboro, New Jersey, US	Marella fell asleep at the wheel and crashed while driving home on the New Jersey Turnpike after a night of refereeing WWF matches in Ocean City, Maryland. Bruno Lauer, better known by his ring name Harvey Wippleman, was with him at the time and was critically injured. Lauer was wearing a seatbelt, while Marella was not.
Doug Marlette	1949	2007	57 years	American	cartoonist	pickup truck	Toyota	Marshall County, Mississippi, US	Hydroplaned and struck a tree.
Gonzalo Márquez	1946	1984	38 years	Venezuelan	major league baseball player	car		Valencia, Carabobo, Venezuela	He was returning home from a baseball game.
Dennis Marshall	1985	2011	25 years	Costa Rican	footballer	car		San José, Costa Rica	
Nathaniel Marston	1975	2015	40 years	American	actor	car		Reno, Nevada, US	Crash occurred on October 30, 2015, leaving him in the hospital for days before he was taken off life support.
Andy Marte	1983	2017	33 years	Dominican	baseball player	car (passenger)	Mercedes-Benz	San Francisco de Macorís, Dominican Republic	
Billy Martin	1928	1989	61 years	American	baseball player and manager	car (passenger)	1989 Ford pickup truck	Port Crane, north of Binghamton, New York, US	He was killed in a low speed, single vehicle collision during an ice storm at the end of the driveway to his farm on Christmas Day, 1989.
Fernando Martín Espina	1962	1989	27 years	Spanish	basketball player	car	limited edition Lancia Thema 8.32	Madrid, Spain	The first Spaniard to play in the NBA and inductee of the FIBA Hall of Fame died in a car crash.
José Carlos Martínez	1962	2011	48 years	Argentinian	politician	car		Tolhuin, Tierra del Fuego, Argentina	
Pyotr Masherov	1918	1980	62 years	Belarusian	first secretary of Belarusian committee of the Communist Party of Soviet Union and a communist leader of Soviet Belarus	car		Minsk, Soviet Union (now Belarus)	His car, escorted by police, collided with a produce truck (potatoes).
Germaine Mason	1983	2017	34 years	Jamaican	track and field	motorcycle		Jamaica	
Tareque Masud	1956	2011	54 years	Bangladeshi	independent film director, producer	microbus		near Ghior Upazila, Bangladesh	Masud died while returning to Dhaka after visiting a shooting location. His microbus collided head-on with a passenger bus. His long-time co-worker Mishuk Munier also died while Masud's wife and four others survived.
Lebo Mathosa	1977	2006	29 years	South African	popular Kwaito singer	car		Johannesburg, South Africa	Her driver lost control of her vehicle. Mathosa's car overturned and hit a tree.
Jolidee Matongo	1975	2021	45–46 years	South African	politician, mayor of Johannesburg	car		Soweto, South Africa	
Altero Matteoli	1940	2017	77 years	Italian	politician	car		Capalbio, Italy	
Johnny Mauro	1910	2003	92 years	United States	racing driver	car		Interstate 70, near Denver, Colorado, US	Head-on collision
Panagiotis Mavrikos	1974	2016	42 years	Greek	newspaper	car		Athens, Greece	
Jason Mayélé	1976	2002	26 years	Congolese	footballer	car		Parma, Italy	His car collided with another while Mayélé was attempting to catch the Chievo team bus for a match against Parma. He was taken to hospital in nearby Verona by helicopter, but died of his injuries.
Lucien Mazan	1882	1917	35 years	French	road bicycle racer			Troyes, France	When he was six he moved with his parents to Buenos Aires where he took Argentine nationality. He joined the French army during the First World War and died when he crashed into an oncoming car at the front near Troyes.
Jean-Marc Mazzonetto	1983	2018	34 years	French	rugby union player	car		Gaillères, France	
Thembinkosi Mbamba	1995	2019	23 years	South African	footballer	car		South Africa	
Aubrey McClendon	1959	2016	56 years	American	CEO of Chesapeake Energy	SUV	Chevy Tahoe	Oklahoma City, Oklahoma, US	Probable suicide the day after he had been indicted by a federal grand jury
Cara McCollum	1992	2016	24 years	American	beauty pageant contestant	car		Camden, New Jersey, US	
Walter McGinn	1936	1977	40 years	American	actor	car		Los Angeles, California, US	Killed on Interstate 210; swerving to avoid an obstacle, he plunged down an embankment and collided with a truck.
Mike McKeever	1940	1967	27 years	American	football player	car		Montebello, California, US	The car crash occurred in 1965 and left Mike in a coma for 22 months until he died.
Bruce McLenna	1941	1968	26 years	American	football player	truck		Urbana, Missouri, US	His military truck was sideswiped by an automobile causing him to crash.
Dinny McNamara	1905	1963	58 years	American	baseball player	pedestrian		Arlington, Massachusetts, US	Struck by a car.
Andy McVann	1965	1986	21 years	British	drummer (The Farm)	car		Liverpool, England, United Kingdom	He died in a crash after attempting to outrun a police car near his Liverpool home.
Miguel Mena	1986	2021	34 years	Peruvian-American	horse jockey	pedestrian		Louisville, Kentucky, US	Struck by a vehicle.
Justin Mentell	1982	2010	27 years	American	actor	car	2005 Jeep	Mineral Point, Wisconsin, US	His vehicle left the roadway on Highway 39, went down an embankment and struck two trees. Possibly Mentell had fallen asleep at the wheel, he was not wearing a seat belt.
Vittorio Mero	1974	2002	27 years	Italian	footballer	car		Rovato, Italy	Vittorio died in a car crash on the A4 highway near Rovato.
Gigi Meroni	1943	1967	24 years	Italian	footballer	pedestrian		Turin, Italy	Meroni was hit by a car while recklessly crossing Corso Re Umberto in Turin with his friend and Torino teammate Fabrizio Poletti.
Bernd and Reiner Methe	1964	2011	47 years	German	handball	car	Mercedes-Benz	between Empfingen and Haigerloch, Germany	
Mario Meoni	1965	2021	56 years	Argentine	politician	car	Ford Mondeo	San Andrés de Giles	Died after his Ford Mondeo lost control and overturned on Route 7 near San Andrés de Giles.
Jordan Michallet	1993	2022	29 years	French	rugby player	car	Renault Mégane	Rouen, France	Michallet crashed his vehicle into the center reservation on the Mathilde bridge. Although he survived the crash, he made his way to a nearby building, which was under construction, and jumped from the fourth floor, being ruled as suicide from jumping.
Solomon Mikhoels	1890	1948	55 years	Russian	actor and Jewish activist	pedestrian		Minsk, Soviet Union	According to official records, Mikhoels and a friend, Sergei Golubev, were run over by a truck. True circumstances became known only in 1951 when Viktor Abakumov, ex-state security minister of the USSR was arrested. It turned out Golubev was a KGB agent. He got a task to invite Mikhoels to his friends' dacha, that belonging to the Belarusian state security chief, Lavrentiy Tsanava. The truck was already prepared, under whose wheels Mikhoels and Golubev (who was sacrificed for the story's credibility) were thrown.
Mike Miley	1953	1977	23 years	American	baseball player	car		Baton Rouge, Louisiana, US	
Darren Millane	1965	1991	26 years	Australian	Australian rules football	car		Albert Park, Victoria, Australia	An intoxicated Millane was driving on Queens Road, near Albert Park Lake before he clipped a semi-trailer and rolled his car, being killed instantly.
Bing Miller	1894	1966	71 years	American	baseball player	car		Philadelphia, Pennsylvania, US	
Jacob Miller	1952	1980	27 years	Jamaican	reggae musician	car		Kingston, Jamaica	
Maikhail Miller	1992	2016	23 years	American	football	SUV		Holly Springs, Mississippi, US	
Fred Mills	1935	2009	74 years	Canadian	trumpeter and music professor	car		Athens, Georgia, US	
Gionata Mingozzi	1984	2008	23 years	Italian	footballer	car	Porsche	Campagna Lupia, Italy	Mingozzi died when his Porsche hit a truck.
Soledad Miranda	1943	1970	27 years	Spanish	actress	car (passenger)		Lisbon, Portugal	Soledad and her husband were driving along the Costa do Sol highway between Estoril and Lisbon when they collided with a small truck, which crushed the car. Although her husband, who was driving, only had minor injuries, Soledad received serious skull and spine fractures, and entered a coma. She died hours later at the Hospital of São José in Lisbon, never having come out of her coma.
Margaret Mitchell	1900	1949	48 years	American	author of Gone with the Wind	pedestrian		Atlanta, Georgia, US	Struck by a speeding automobile as she crossed Peachtree Street at 13th Street in Atlanta with her husband, John Marsh, while on her way to see a movie. She died five days later without regaining full consciousness.
Tom Mix	1880	1940	60 years	American	actor	car	1937 Cord 812	Florence, Arizona, US	Heading to Phoenix, he came upon construction barriers at a bridge washed away by a flash flood. He was unable to stop in time. The car swerved twice, then rolled into a gully, pinning his body underneath. Mix was killed almost instantly.
Nikola Mladenov	1964	2013	49 years	Macedonian	journalist	car	Mercedes-Benz	Skopje, Macedonia	
Russell Mockridge	1928	1958	30 years	Australian	racing cyclist	bicycle		Clayton, Victoria, Australia	During the Tour of Gippsland cycle race, shortly after the start, Mockridge was struck by a bus and killed at the Dandenong Road and Clayton Road intersection.
Mpho Moerane		2022		South African	businessman and politician	car		Johannesburg, South Africa	Exactly a week after Moerane was involved in his car crash, he succumbed to his injuries and never woke up after being unconscious.
Afshin Moghadam	1945	1976	30 years	Iranian	pop singer	car		Tehran, Iran	
Émilie Mondor	1981	2006	25 years	Canadian	runner	car		Hawkesbury, Ontario, Canada	She lost control over of her vehicle while passing two other vehicles.
Michel Monet	1878	1966	87 years	French	son of Claude Monet	car		Vernon, France	
Michelle Monkhouse	1991	2011	19 years	Canadian	fashion model	car		Markham, Ontario, Canada	Contact with black ice caused her to collide with oncoming traffic.
Carlos Monzón	1942	1995	52 years	Argentinian	boxer	car		Santa Rosa de Calchines, Argentina	Monzon was killed when his car ran off a road and overturned during a weekend furlough.
Aurelio Monteagudo	1943	1990	46 years	Mexican-Cuban	baseball pitcher	car		Saltillo, Coahuila, Mexico	
Al Montgomery	1920	1942	21 years	American	baseball player (catcher)	car		Waverly, Virginia, US	
Fred Moore	1911	1952	41 years	American	animator	car		Big Tujunga Canyon near the Angeles National Forest	
Bob Moose	1947	1976	29 years	American	baseball player	car		near Martins Ferry, Ohio, US	Killed in a head-on collision heading to Bill Mazeroski's golf course on his 29th birthday.
Constancia de la Mora	1906	1950	43 years	Spanish	writer and political activist	car		Guatemala City, Guatemala	
Saúl Morales	1973	2000	26 years	Spanish	racing cyclist	bicycle		Caucete, San Juan Province, Argentina	During the Tour of Argentina he was hit by a truck that came between the riders.
Peggy Moran	1918	2002	84 years	American	actress	car		California, US	She died from her injuries two months after a crash on August 26, 2002, in Camarillo, California.
Rushton Moreve	1948	1981	32 years	American	bass guitarist for Steppenwolf	car		Sun Valley, Los Angeles, California, US	
Rob Moroso	1968	1990	22 years	American	NASCAR Winston Cup driver	car	Oldsmobile Cutlass (1990)	near Terrell, North Carolina, US	Under the influence of alcohol and travelling at too high a speed, Moroso lost control going round a tight curve, veering into an oncoming car killing its driver along with himself.
Elhard von Morozowicz	1893	1934	40 years	German	SA-Gruppenführer	car		Berlin, Germany	
Damien "Damo" Morris	1980	2007	27 years	Australian	deathcore musician (The Red Shore)	bus		Pacific Highway near Coffs Harbour, New South Wales, Australia	
Runako Morton	1978	2012	33 years	Nevisian	cricketer	car		Chaguanas, Trinidad and Tobago	
Ezra Moseley	1958	2021	63 years	Barbadian	cricketer	bicycle		Christ Church, Barbados	He was hit by a car while cycling for exercise.
Moshoeshoe II of Lesotho	1938	1996	57 years	Sotho	monarch of his country	car		in the Maloti Mountains, Lesotho	Car veered off cliff, killing both the royal and his chauffeur.
Mike Mosley	1946	1984	37 years	American	Indy car driver	van		near Aguanga, California, US	Died when he lost control of the truck, which rolled down an embankment and caught fire.
Idriss Ndele Moussa	1959	2013	54 years	Chadian	politician	car		N'Djamena, Chad	
MS-1	1956	2012	55 years	Mexican	luchador	car		Huamantla, Tlaxcala, Mexico	
Howard Mudd	1942	2020	78 years	American	football player and coach	motorcycle		Seattle, Washington, US	Died in intensive care in Seattle two weeks after a motorcycle crash.
Lucille Mulhall	1885	1940	55 years	American	cowgirl, Wild West performer	car		Mulhall, Oklahoma, US	Killed in an automobile crash less than a mile from the Mulhall Ranch.
Pat Mullins	1937	2017	79 years	American	politician	car		Hanover County, Virginia, US	Drove off the road and collided with a tree.
Rich Mullins	1955	1997	41 years	American	Christian music artist	car	Jeep	north of Bloomington, Illinois, US	Mullins and a friend were traveling southbound on I-39 when his Jeep rolled over. They were not wearing seat belts and were both ejected from the vehicle. When a passing semi-trailer truck swerved to miss the overturned Jeep, Mullins, who was too injured to move out of the path of the oncoming truck was hit and died instantly at the scene.
Brenda Muntemba	1970	2019	48 years	Zambian	Zambia's High Commissioner to Kenya	car			Muntemba was involved in a head-on collision on February 26, 2019, and was admitted to hospital where she died on March 19, 2019.
F. W. Murnau	1888	1931	42 years	German	film director of Nosferatu	car	Rolls-Royce	along the Pacific Coast Highway near Rincon Beach, south of Santa Barbara, California, US	Murnau hit his head and died in a hospital the day after his car hit an electric pole.
Sir John Murray	1841	1914	73 years	Scots-Canadian	marine biologist	car		Kirkliston, Edinburgh, Scotland, United Kingdom	His car overturned near his home.
M. V. V. S. Murthi	1942	2018	76 years	Indian	politician	car		Cantwell, Alaska, US	
Paola Musiani	1949	1985	35 years	Italian	singer	car		Bologna, Italy	
Charles Mutschler	1955	2019	63 years	American	archivist	car		Cheney, Washington, United States	
Mike Muuss	1958	2000	42 years	American	computer programmer, creator of Ping	car		Havre de Grace, Maryland, US	He died while returning home from a restaurant, when his car was involved in a multi-vehicle pileup on Interstate 95.
Erik Myers	1980	2021	40 years	American	actor-comedian and writer	pedestrian		Amarillo, Texas, US	He was hit by a van.
Aliaksei Mzhachyk	1996	2021	25 years	Belarusian	weightlifter	car		Germany	

== N ==
Name	Birth	Death	Aged	Nationality	Notability	Mode of transport	Vehicle	Crash location	Details
Jafar Masood Hasani Nadwi	1965	2025	59 years	Indian	scholar				
Iuliu Năftănăilă	1942	1967	25 years	Romanian	footballer	car		Făgăraș, Romania	Crashed into a tree.
Shobha Nagi Reddy	1968	2014	45 years	Indian	politician	car		Hyderabad, India	
Kinjarapu Yerran Naidu	1957	2012	55 years	Indian	politician	car		Ranasthalam, India	
Eric Namesnik	1970	2006	35 years	American	swimmer, Olympic medalist	car		Pittsfield Township, Michigan, US	He died in Ypsilanti, Michigan, from his injuries a week after a car crash.
Dorothy Napangardi		2013		Australian	indigenous artist	car			
Norberto Napolitano	1950	2005	54 years	Argentinian	blues and metal/rock musician	motorcycle	Harley-Davidson	route 5, km 71, Luján, Buenos Aires Province, Argentina	
Nicolás Naranjo	1990	2021	31 years	Argentinian	racing cyclist	bicycle		Mendoza, Argentina	
Hiromu Naruse	1944	2010	67 years	Japanese	chief test driver and chief test engineer of Toyota	car	Lexus LFA Nürburgring Edition	Boos, Mayen-Koblenz, Germany	Veered onto the path of a prototype BMW 3 Series, also on a testing exercise, frontally. All three occupants involved wore helmets.
John Nash	1928	2015	86 years	American	mathematician	taxi	Ford Crown Victoria	Monroe Township, New Jersey, US	
Jared Nathan	1985	2006	21 years	American	former child actor for Zoom	car (passenger)		Hollis, New Hampshire, US	Jared's best friend Gabriel King was driving recklessly when he hit a roadside tree. Jared was pronounced dead at the hospital.
Atashasta Justus Nditiye	1969	2021	51 years	Tanzanian	politician	car		Dodoma, Tanzania	
Adam Ndlovu	1970	2012	42 years	Zimbabwean	footballer	car		Victoria Falls Airport, Zimbabwe	
Merv Neagle	1958	2012	54 years	Australian	footballer	truck		Tharbogang, New South Wales, Australia	Neagle's B-double truck flipped over and crushed the cabin.
Louis Neefs	1937	1980	42 years	Belgian	singer and presenter	car		Lier, Antwerp Province, Belgium	Neefs and his wife Liliane were killed on Christmas Day when another car hit theirs. Their 15-year-old son survived.
Franz Leopold Neumann	1900	1954	54 years	German-Jewish	political activist	car		Visp, Switzerland	
Fred Newman	1942	1987	45 years	American	baseball pitcher	car		Holliston, Massachusetts, US	
Dick Newsome	1909	1965	56 years	American	baseball pitcher	car		Ahoskie, North Carolina, US	
Anele Ngcongca	1987	2020	33 years	South African	footballer	car		KwaZulu-Natal, South Africa	
Yves Niare	1977	2012	35 years	French	shot putter	car		Pirmil, France	
John Nicholson	1936	1966	29 years	English	footballer	car		Doncaster, England, United Kingdom	
Rudolf Nierlich	1966	1991	25 years	Austrian	Alpine skier	car		Sankt Wolfgang im Salzkammergut, Vienna, Austria	
Richard Nixon	1965	1992	26 years	Australian	Australian rules footballer	van (passenger)		Millicent, South Australia, Australia	He was one of seven occupants in the van that collided with a truck.
Elli Norkett	1996	2017	20 years	Welsh	rugby union player	car		Neath Port Talbot, Wales, United Kingdom	
Ralph Norwood	1966	1989	23 years	American	American football player	car		Suwanee, Georgia, US	Veered off down an embankment into a tree 8 miles (13 km) from his team's training complex.
Emiddio Novi	1946	2018	72 years	Italian	journalist and politician	car		Sant'Agata di Puglia, Italy	
Nujabes	1974	2010	36 years	Japanese	record producer, DJ	car		Shibuya, Tokyo, Japan	
Mthokozisi Nxumalo	1989	2021	32 years	South African	politician	car		Nongoma, South Africa	
Siddu B. Nyamagouda		2018	70 years	Indian	politician	car			

== O ==
Name	Birth	Death	Aged	Nationality	Notability	Mode of transport	Vehicle	Crash location	Details
Richard O'Brien	1956	2017	60 years	American	newscaster	car			
Frank O'Hara	1926	1966	40 years	American	writer	pedestrian		Fire Island, New York, US	O'Hara was struck by a jeep when the taxi he was riding in broke down on the side of the road and he went out to help investigate the problem. He died of a ruptured liver the next day.
Gene O'Quin	1932	1978	46 years	American	country and honky tonk singer	car		Riverside, California, US	The car he was in was hit by a bus.
John O'Quinn	1941	2009	68 years	American	lawyer	car	Chevrolet Suburban	Houston, Texas, US	O'Quinn was driving twice the 40 mph speed limit in the rain at 8 am where his Suburban slammed into a tree.
Beverley O'Sullivan	1981	2009	28 years	Irish	singer	car (passenger)		Bharatpur, India	She died in a car accident while on holiday in India with her boyfriend, who was the driver of the car and was hospitalized with injuries.
Paul O'Sullivan	1964	2012	48 years	Canadian	comedian	car		Peterborough, Ontario, Canada	O'Sullivan's car left the road and struck a parked flatbed truck.
Berry Oakley	1948	1972	24 years	American	bass guitarist for the Allman Brothers Band	motorcycle		Macon, Georgia, US	Oakley was driving around a sharp right bend of the road when he crossed the line and collided with a city bus making the bend from the opposite direction. He was thrown from his bike and struck his head. He said he was okay, declined medical treatment, and caught a ride home. Three hours later, he was rushed to the hospital where he died of cerebral swelling caused by a fractured skull.
Barack Obama Sr.	1936	1982	46 years	Kenyan	economist; father of Barack Obama	car		Nairobi, Kenya	Obama was killed in a car crash, having previously survived two crashes.
Solomon Oboh	1989	2013	23 years	Nigerian	footballer	car		Ughelli, Nigeria	
Sigifredo Ochoa	1942	2023	80 years	Salvadoran	military officer and politician	car (passenger)		San Juan Opico, El Salvador	Ochoa was a passenger in a vehicle on the highway heading to Quezaltepeque when the driver, 64- year old Emma Micaela Friedman de Martínez lost control and crashed into the back of a parked truck. Sigifredo was trapped under the truck and was freed using hydraulic equipment, but died from injuries hours later in hospital.
James Ocholi	1960	2016	55 years	Nigerian	politician	car		Kaduna, Abuja, Nigeria	
Frank Odoi	1948	2012	63 or 64 years	Ghanaian	cartoonist	bus		Nairobi, Kenya	
Patricia Ofori	1981	2011	29 years	Ghanaian	footballer	car	Ford Mustang	Huntsville, Alabama, United States	
Daihachi Oguchi	1924	2008	84 years	Japanese	drummer (Osuwa Daiko)	pedestrian		Japan	
Oh Se-jong	1982	2016	33 years	South Korean	short track speed skater	motorcycle		Seoul, South Korea	
Masao Ohba	1949	1973	23 years	Japanese	boxer	car	Chevrolet Corvette	Tokyo, Japan	Ohba died on an expressway in Tokyo, when his car hit a truck coming down the opposite lane.
Metin Oktay	1936	1991	55 years	Turkish	footballer	car		Istanbul, Turkey	
Daisuke Oku	1976	2014	38 years	Japanese	footballer	car		Miyakojima, Okinawa Prefecture, Japan	
Criss Oliva	1963	1993	30 years	American	lead guitarist and co-founder of heavy metal band Savatage	car	Mazda RX-7	near Zephyrhills, Florida, US	His wife Dawn was a passenger when he was struck by a drunk driver. Dawn survived, but Criss died immediately.
José Oliva	1971	1997	26 years	Dominican	baseball player	car		San Cristóbal, Dominican Republic	Car overturned.
Max Orr	1931	1955	24 years	Australian	Australian rules footballer	van		Melton, Victoria, Australia	He collided with a semi trailer and died instantly. His father, who was a passenger, was injured.
Eli Ostreicher	1983	2023	39 years	British-born American	serial entrepreneur	motorcycle		Thailand	
Mel Ott	1909	1958	49 years	American	baseball player and Hall of Famer	car		New Orleans, Louisiana, US	He died one week after a head-on collision in which the other driver died instantly.
Willem van Otterloo	1907	1978	70 years	Dutch	conductor, cellist and composer	car		St Kilda East, Victoria, Australia	He died from injuries suffered in an automobile crash.
Ricardo Otxoa	1974	2001	26 years	Spanish	racing cyclist	bicycle		Cártama, Spain	Ricardo and his twin brother Javier were hit by a car during a training ride. Ricardo died while Javier survived despite being in a coma afterwards.
Lassaâd Ouertani	1980	2013	32 years	Tunisian	footballer	car		Tunis, Tunisia	
David Overstreet	1958	1984	25 years	American	football player	car	1980 Mercedes	Winona, Texas, US	
Şehmus Özer	1980	2016	36 years	Turkish	footballer	SUV	Range Rover	Sivrice, Elazığ, Turkey	

== P ==
Name	Birth	Death	Aged	Nationality	Notability	Mode of transport	Vehicle	Crash location	Details
Ignacio Padilla	1968	2016	47 years	Mexican	writer	car		Querétaro, Mexico	Padilla was driving at the central state of Querétaro when his car collided with another vehicle.
Luis Fernando Páez	1989	2019	29 years	Paraguayan	footballer	car		Mariano Roque Alonso, Paraguay	
Carlos Paião	1957	1988	30 years	Portuguese	singer-songwriter	car	Datsun Urvan	Rio Maior, Santarém District, Portugal	
Alan J. Pakula	1928	1998	70 years	American	film producer	car	1995 Volvo	Melville, New York, US	
Johnny Palermo	1982	2009	27 years	American	television actor	car		North Hollywood, California, US	He and his girlfriend were both killed in the crash.
Mauro Pane	1963	2014	50 years	Italian	racing driver	car (passenger)		between Tromello and Gambolò, Lomellina, Italy	
Pantelis Pantelidis	1983	2016	32 years	Greek	singer-songwriter	car		Elliniko, Greece	
Sibusiso Papa	1987	2014	26 years	South African	footballer	car			
Fran Papasedero	1969	2003	34 Years	American	arena football player and coach	car	Lexus sedan	Orlando, Florida, US	Car lost control and rolled four times; ejected due to not wearing seat belt.
Park Chul-soo	1948	2013	64 years	South Korean	film director	car		Yongin, Gyeonggi Province, Seoul, South Korea	
Mike Parkes	1931	1977	45 years	English	auto racer	car		Turin, Italy	
Jordan Parsons	1990	2016	25 years	American	mixed martial artist	pedestrian		Delray Beach, Florida, US	Parsons was crossing an intersection on foot when he was struck by a vehicle.
Virgil Partch	1916	1984	67 years	American	cartoonist	car		Valencia, Santa Clarita, California, US	
Frank Pastore	1957	2012	55 years	American	baseball player	motorcycle		Upland, California, US	
David Patten	1974	2021	47 years	American	football player	motorcycle		Columbia, South Carolina, US	Collided with a sedan, which later collided with another vehicle.
Jarrod Patterson	1973	2020	46 years	American	Baseball player	car		Clanton, Alabama, US	Two-vehicle crash. The driver of the other car was also killed.
Roger Patterson	1968	1991	22 years	American	bassist for rock band Atheist	car			
Simon Patterson	1982	2006	24 years	English	footballer	car	BMW 328i	Shepherd's Bush, London, England	
George S. Patton	1885	1945	60 years	American	General	car	1939 Cadillac Series 75	near Mannheim, Germany	Hit limousine detachment. Died from complications 12 days later.
Alexandra Paul	1991	2023	31 years	Canadian	figure skater	car		Country Road 124 in Melancthon, Ontario, Canada	Stopped in a line of traffic in a construction zone when a tractor trailer crashed into the line of cars. Although others were injured, Paul is the only reported fatality.
Butch Paul	1943	1966	22 years	Canadian	ice hockey player	car		Memphis, Tennessee, US	
Henri Paul	1956	1997	41 years	French	chauffeur	car	Mercedes-Benz S280	Pont de l'Alma tunnel, Paris	See also Death of Diana, Princess of Wales.
Oswaldo Payá	1952	2012	60 years	Cuban	dissident and political activist	car		Bayamo, Cuba	Died under controversial circumstances. The Cuban government stated that the driver had lost control of the vehicle and collided with a tree, while Payá's children and one of the car's passengers asserted that the car had been deliberately run off of the road.
Charles E. M. Pearce	1940	2012	72 years	New Zealander	mathematician	car		Manakaiua River, West Coast, New Zealand	
Sebastijan Pečjak	1976	2012	35 years	Slovenian	darts player	motorcycle		Ljubljana, Slovenia	
Yadier Pedroso	1986	2013	26 years	Cuban	baseball pitcher	car		Cuba	
José Pedrozo	1982	2021	38 years	Paraguayan	footballer	car		Misiones, Paraguay	
George Pelawa	1968	1986	18 years	American	ice hockey player	car (passenger)		Bemidji, Minnesota, US	The fatal crash occurred three months after he was selected by the Calgary Flames in the 1986 NHL entry draft.
David Penhaligon	1944	1986	42 years	British	politician	car	Rover SD1	Truck Fork, Probus, Cornwall, England, United Kingdom	
Eddie Peregrina	1944	1977	32 years	Filipino	singer	car		Mandaluyong, Metro Manila, Philippines	Peregrina was riding in a central EDSA when it collided with a truck.
Fábio Pereira de Azevedo	1977	2018	41 years	Brazilian	footballer	car		Maravilha, Brazil	
Maicon Pereira de Oliveira	1988	2014	25 years	Brazilian	footballer	car		Donetsk, Ukraine	
AJ Perez	1993	2011	18 years	Filipino	actor	van (passenger)		Moncada, Tarlac, Philippines	Perez was riding in an ABS-CBN service van when it collided with another vehicle.
Halina Perez	1981	2004	22 years	Filipina	actress	van (passenger)		Del Gallego, Camarines Norte, Philippines	Perez was riding in a van as a passenger when it collided with another vehicle. Her neck was broken and although she was still breathing when rescuers arrived, she was dead on reaching hospital.
Åke Persson	1932	1975	42 years	Swedish	jazz trombonist	car		Stockholm, Sweden	On February 5, 1975, he drove his car into the Djurgården canal in Stockholm and drowned. It is unknown if it was accidental or deliberate.
Maurício Alves Peruchi	1990	2014	24 years	Brazilian	footballer (striker)	car		Gauchy, Hauts-de-France, France	
Saleem Pervez	1947	2013	65 years	Pakistani	cricketer	car		Lahore, Pakistan	
Pessalli	1990	2017	26 years	Brazilian	footballer	car		Curitiba, Brazil	
Odirlei Pessoni	1982	2021	38 years	Brazilian	bobsledder	motorcycle		Ibiraci, Brazil	
Dražen Petrović	1964	1993	28 years	Croatian	basketball player	car	Volkswagen Golf	Bundesautobahn 9 near Denkendorf, Bavaria, Germany	On a cloudy and rainy afternoon, the driver of a northbound semi-trailer truck swerved to avoid a collision with a car in his lane. The truck broke through the median, blocking all three southbound lanes. Seconds later, the car in which Petrović was a passenger hit the truck. The sleeping Petrović, who was not seat-belted, died on impact. His girlfriend, who was driving, and another passenger in the car suffered grave injuries, but survived.
Peter Pettalia	1955	2016	61 years	American	politician	motorcycle		Montmorency County, Michigan, US	
Ouk Phalla		2018	39 years	Cambodian	dancer (member of royal family)	car		Sihanoukville Province, Cambodia	
Vince Phason	1953	2018	65 years	American	football player	car		Denver, Colorado, United States	
Bobby Phills	1969	2000	30 years	American	basketball player	car	1997 Porsche 993 Cabriolet	Charlotte, North Carolina, US	
Mark Philo	1984	2006	21 years	English	footballer	car	Vauxhall Astra	Reading, Berkshire, England, United Kingdom	
Peace Pilgrim	1908	1981	72 years	American	Peace activist	car		Knox, Indiana, US	Birth name Mildred Lisette Norman. Walked across the United States seven times over a span of 28 years, speaking with others about peace.
Rajesh Pilot	1945	2000	55 years	Indian	Indian Minister and politician from Congress party	jeep		Jaipur, India	
Andrea Pininfarina	1957	2008	51 years	Italian	engineer and manager, CEO of Pininfarina	scooter	Vespa GT60	Trofarello, Piedmont, Italy	
Ja'far Pishevari	1893	1947	53–54 years	Persian	founder and chairman of short-lived Azerbaijan People's Government	car		Baku, Azerbaijan	
Audie Pitre	1970	1996	26 years	American	bassist of music group Acid Bath	car		Bourg-Larose Highway, Louisiana, US	Audie Pitre and his parents were killed when they were hit head-on by a drunk driver on the Bourg-Larose Highway in Louisiana.
Tulsa Pittaway	1974	2017	42 years	South African	musician	car		Johannesburg, Gauteng, South Africa	
Walter Plecker	1861	1947	86 years	American	physician and public health advocate	pedestrian		Richmond, Virginia, US	Hit by a car.
Greg Plitt	1977	2015	37 years	American	fitness model, actor	pedestrian		Burbank, California, United States	Struck by a train.
Vasek Polak	1914	1997	82 years	American	racing team owner	car	1997 Porsche 993 Turbo S	German Autobahn, Germany	Died from injuries in Great Falls, Montana whilst flying back to the US, a month after he crashed his car on a German autobahn at 110 mph, breaking his bones but no internal injuries.
Jackson Pollock	1912	1956	44 years	American	artist	car	1950 Oldsmobile 88 convertible	Springs, New York, US	Intoxicated while driving.
Jim Pomeroy	1952	2006	53 years	American	motocross racer	car	Jeep	Yakima, Washington, US	Single vehicle, rollover crash.
Wangnia Pongte		2013	60 years	Indian	football and politician	car			
Anca Pop	1984	2018	34 years	Romanian/Canadian	singer	car		Svinița, Mehedinți County, România	
Krystian Popiela	1998	2018	20 years	Polish	footballer	car		Wola Wielka, Poland	
Ben Portis	1960	2017	56 years	Canadian	artist and curator	car			
Viktor Potapov	1947	2017	70 years	Russian	sailor	car		Dolgoprudny, Moscow Oblast, Russia	
Cozy Powell	1947	1998	50 years	British	drummer with Whitesnake	car	Saab 9000	M4 motorway, Bristol, England, United Kingdom	Powell's blood-alcohol reading shown that he was over the legal limit at the time of crash, also he was not wearing a seatbelt, and was talking to his girlfriend on his mobile phone while driving.
Richie Powell	1931	1956	24 years	American	jazz pianist	car (passenger)		near Bedford, Pennsylvania, US	He was killed in the same crash that killed jazz trumpeter Clifford Brown.
David Prater	1937	1988	50 years	American	soul singer; one half of Sam & Dave	car		Sycamore, Georgia, US	
Steve Prefontaine	1951	1975	24 years	American	athlete	car	MG MGB	Eugene, Oregon, US	Car swerved, hit a rock wall, and flipped, trapping him underneath. A witness saw him alive beneath the car, but could not move the vehicle. By the time the witness returned with help, Prefontaine had died.
June Preisser	1920	1984	64 years	American	actress	car		Florida, US	Son Ricky Preisser lost control of vehicle on rain-slick road, killing himself and mother.
Toše Proeski	1981	2007	26 years	Macedonian	pop star	car	Volkswagen Touareg	Nova Gradiška, Brod-Posavina County, Croatia	Driver's inattention allowed the car to crash into the back of a truck trailer on the A3 motorway. Proeski was sitting in the front passenger seat and was killed instantly. Car's speed was 140–171 km/h (87–106 mph), but experts found it did not play a role in the singer's death.
Jory Prum	1975	2016	41 years	American	audio engineer	motorcycle		Palo Alto, California, US	
Buford Pusser	1937	1974	36 years	American	Sheriff of McNairy County, Tennessee	car	Chevrolet Corvette	near Adamsville, Tennessee, US	Pusser died from injuries sustained when he struck an embankment at high speed and was ejected from the vehicle and the car caught fire and burned.

== Q ==
Name	Birth	Death	Aged	Nationality	Notability	Mode of transport	Vehicle	Crash location	Details
Eric Qin	1967	1993	25 years	American	experimental music composer	bicycle		Upper West Side, Manhattan, New York, US	
Valérie Quennessen	1957	1989	31 years	French	actress	car		A13 autoroute, France	
Jack Quinlan	1927	1965	38 years	American	sportscaster	car		Scottsdale, Arizona, US	
Ludovic Quistin	1984	2012	28 years	Guadeloupean	footballer	car		Grande-Terre, Guadeloupe	
Jocelyn Quivrin	1979	2009	30 years	French	actor	car	Ariel Atom	Saint-Cloud, Hauts-de-Seine, France	Lost control while driving on a wet highway.

== R ==
Name	Birth	Death	Aged	Nationality	Notability	Mode of transport	Vehicle	Crash location	Details
Ntuthuko Radebe	1994	2017	22 years	South African	footballer	car		Johannesburg, South Africa	
Varkala Radhakrishnan	1927	2010	83 years	Indian	politician	car		Thiruvananthapuram, India	
Darko Radovanović	1975	2011	35 years	Serbian	singer	car		Belgrade, Serbia	
Mamie Rallins	1941	2016	74 years	American	hurdler	car		Fremont, Ohio, US	Rallins lost control on the collision.
Dottie Rambo	1934	2008	74 years	American	gospel singer and songwriter	tour bus		Mount Vernon, Missouri, US	
Paul Ramos	1990	2019	28 years	Argentinian	footballer	car		Córdoba, Argentina	
Manjural Islam Rana	1984	2007	22 years	Bangladeshi	cricketer	motorcycle		Khulna, Bangladesh	Collided with a microbus and then hit an electrical pole.
Joe Ranft	1960	2005	45 years	American	animator and voice actor for Pixar	car	2004 Honda Element	California State Route 1, Mendocino County, California, US	
Razzle	1960	1984	24 years	British	Hanoi Rocks drummer	car	De Tomaso Pantera	Redondo Beach, California, US	Car was driven by its owner, Vince Neil who crashed while driving intoxicated as well was speeding
Darryl Read	1951	2013	61 years	British	musician	motorcycle		Pattaya, Thailand	
Davide Rebellin	1971	2022	51 years	Italian	cyclist	bicycle		Montebello Vicentino, Italy	A month after he retired from professional cycling, Rebellin was hit by a truck and killed while out on a training ride.
Ron Rector	1944	1968	24 years	American	football player	motorcycle		Interstate 71, US	He suffered a fractured skull and a concussion and later died from the injuries.
Ken Reed	1941	2014	72 years	Canadian	CFL player	car		Alaska Highway, US	
Natina Reed	1980	2012	31 years	American	actress, rapper and singer-songwriter	pedestrian		Lawrenceville, Georgia, US	She was struck by a vehicle and rushed to a close hospital in Duluth, Georgia, where she was pronounced dead on arrival.
River Reeves	1996	2016	19 years	British	guitarist of the rock band Viola Beach	car (passenger)	Nissan Qashqai	Södertälje, Sweden	All four members of the band died in this crash, along with their manager. See under Craig Tarry.
Clay Regazzoni	1939	2006	67 years	Swiss	retired racing driver	car	Chrysler Voyager	A1 Autostrada, near Parma, Italy	
Bruce K. Reid	1950	1970	20 years	Australian	Australian rules football player	car		Leeton, New South Wales, Australia	
Ebony Reigns	1997	2018	20 years	Ghanaian	singer	car		Sunyani, Ghana	
Mike Reinbach	1949	1989	39 years	American	baseball player	car		Palm Desert, California, US	
Don Reinhoudt	1945	2023	78 years	American	weightlifter	car		Chautauqa County, New York, US	Reinhoudt crashed into a tree in a one vehicle accident in New York and died from his injuries.
Heinie Reitz	1867	1914	47 years	American	baseball player	pedestrian		Sacramento, California, US	Reitz was struck by a car.
Wolfgang Reitherman	1909	1985	75 years	American	film director, producer & animator for Disney	single-car		Burbank, California, US	
José Antonio Reyes	1983	2019	35 years	Spanish	footballer	car	Mercedes-Benz S550	between Utrera and Seville, Spain	
Don Rich	1941	1974	32 years	American	country music musician and singer; member of Buck Owens' Buckaroos	motorcycle		near Bakersfield, California, US	Struck a guardrail after losing control of his motorcycle on Highway 99 north of Bakersfield, while traveling to Morro Bay for a family vacation.
Jacques Richard	1952	2002	50 years	Canadian	ice hockey player	car		Issoudun, Quebec, Canada	Crashed into a culvert.
Gareth Richards	1979	2023	43 years	British	comedian	car		M25 Motorway near Heathrow Airport	He was involved in a collision that caused severe brain injuries, putting him on life support in a London hospital. Just over a week after the accident, he died.
Ed "Doc" Ricketts	1897	1948	50 years	American	Collaborator with John Steinbeck, inspiration for "Doc" in Cannery Row.	car		Monterey, California, US	Struck by passenger train.
Gregory Rigters	1985	2017	32 years	Surinamese	footballer	car		Paramaribo, Suriname	
Freddy Rincón	1966	2022	55 years	Colombian	footballer			Cali, Colombia	Died from head injuries sustained in a traffic collision
Cowboy Slim Rinehart	1911	1948	37 years	American	country & western singer	car		Detroit, Michigan, US	
Hartmut Ritzerfeld	1950	2024	73 years	German	painter	car		Stolberg-Büsbach	Died from head injuries sustained in a traffic collision weeks before.
Jennie Robak	1932	2014	81 years	American	politician	car		Lincoln, Nebraska, US	
Curt Roberts	1929	1969	40 years	American	baseball player	stationary		Oakland, California, US	Struck by a car while changing a flat tire.
Rockin' Robin Roberts	1940	1967	27 years	American	rock and roll singer for The Fabulous Wailers	car		San Mateo County, California, US	Killed on impact after traveling the wrong way on a divided freeway.
Derrell Robertson	1967	1994	27 years	American	CFL football player	car		Dallas, Texas, US	
Isiah Robertson	1949	2018	69 years	American	football player	limousine		Dallas, Texas, US	Rain and driving at high speeds caused a three-car crash.
Sherry Robertson	1919	1970	51 years	American	baseball player	car		Houghton, South Dakota, US	
Kenny Robinson	1969	1999	29 years	American	major league baseball pitcher	car		Tucson, Arizona, US	
Graciano Rocchigiani	1963	2018	54 years	German	boxer	pedestrian		Belpasso, Italy	
John D. Rockefeller III	1906	1978	72 years	American	philanthropist	car		Mount Pleasant, New York, US	He was en route to Pocantico Hills from his farm in Mount Pleasant when a teenaged driver crashed head-on into the car Rockefeller's secretary was driving.
Rodrigo Bueno	1973	2000	27 years	Argentinian	cuarteto singer and songwriter	car	Ford Explorer	Berazategui Partido, Buenos Aires, Argentina	
Paulo Rodrigues da Silva	1986	2012	25 years	Brazilian	footballer	car		Bohutín, Czech Republic	
Andres Rodriguez	1984	2016	31 years	Venezuelan	show jumper	car		Wellington, Florida, US	
Aurelio Rodríguez	1947	2000	52 years	Mexican	baseball player	pedestrian		Detroit, Michigan, US	Hit by a woman with suspended license.
Joe Rollino	1905	2010	104 years	American	strongman	pedestrian		Dyker Heights, Brooklyn, New York, US	Crossing street 40 ft (12 m) from nearest crosswalk.
Maxi Rolón	1995	2022	27 years	Argentine	footballer	car		near Casilda, Argentina	Both Maxi and his brother Ariel were in a vehicle that went off the road and crashed head on into a nearby tree. Both Maxi and Ariel died from the injuries.
Jean Rondeau	1946	1985	39 years	French	racing driver and race car builder	car		Champagné, France	Attempted to drive through a closed level crossing to follow a police car and was struck by a train.
Ed Ross	1965	2016	50 years	American	photographer	motorcycle		near Yosemite National Park, US	
Braggo Roth	1892	1936	44 years	American	baseball player	car		Chicago, Illinois, US	Collided with a newspaper truck.
Hansford Rowe	1924	2017	93 years	American	actor	car			
Jerry Rubin	1938	1994	56 years	American	social activist	pedestrian		Los Angeles, California, US	Jaywalked on Wilshire Boulevard and was struck by a car. Died of a heart attack while hospitalized.
Porfirio Rubirosa	1909	1965	56 years	Dominican	Dominican diplomat	car	1960 Ferrari 250 GT Cabriolet	Paris, France	Crashed into a tree while driving intoxicated.
Don Rudolph	1931	1968	37 years	American	baseball pitcher	truck		Granada Hills, California, US	Lost control of his truck on a steep grade; was thrown from the cab and the truck rolled over him.
Chico Ruiz	1938	1972	33 years	Cuban	baseball player	car		San Diego, California, US	He drove into a sign pole.
Ted Rusoff	1939	2013	74 years	Canadian-American	actor	car		Rome, Italy	
Darrell Russell	1976	2005	29 years	American	football player	car (passenger)	2004 Pontiac Grand Prix	Los Angeles, California, US	Car was driven by former teammate Michael Bastianelli, who was also killed.
Frank Ryan	1960	2010	50 years	American	plastic surgeon	car	1995 Jeep Wrangler	California State Route 1, Malibu, California, US	Car drove off the cliff, his passenger Jill the dog was thrown out of the vehicle but survived with some minor injuries. Likely to have been caused by "tweeting" while driving.

== S ==
Name	Birth	Death	Aged	Nationality	Notability	Mode of transport	Vehicle	Crash location	Details
Natasja Saad	1974	2007	32 years	Danish	rapper and reggae singer	car		Spanish Town, Jamaica	
Silvestar Sabolčki	1979	2003	23 years	Croatian	footballer	car	Audi A3	Varaždin, Croatia	Sabolčki's vehicle was torn apart upon hitting two light poles and traffic signs at high speed. He and two other passengers were ejected from the vehicle and killed instantly.
Keiji Sada	1926	1964	37 years	Japanese	actor	car		Nirasaki, Yamanashi, Japan	
Roei Sadan	1982	2021	39 years	Israeli	cyclist	bicycle		Israel	He was hit by a bus while cycling.
Alex Sadkin	1949	1987	38 years	American	record producer	car		Nassau County, Florida, US	
Sumy Sadurni	1989	2022	32 years	Chilean	photojournalist			Uganda	Sadurni was killed in a traffic crash in Uganda. A Ugandan NGO worker, named Thomas Mugisha was also killed in the crash.
Dulce Saguisag	1943	2007	64 years	Filipina	politician	van (passenger)	Toyota Grandia	Makati, Philippines	Saguisag was riding in a van when it collided with another vehicle.
Proloy Saha	1968	2016	47 years	Indian	football	car		Odisha, India	
Sultan Saif	1993	2020	27 years	Emirati	footballer	car		Abu Dhabi, United Arab Emirates	
Gonzague Saint Bris	1948	2017	69 years	French	Novelist, biographer & journalist	car		Saint-Hymer, Calvados, France	
Yakkun Sakurazuka	1976	2013	37 years	Japanese	comedian	car		Mine, Yamaguchi, Japan	
Emanuel Saldaño	1985	2014	28 years	Argentinian	cyclist	bicycle		Argentina	
Jlloyd Samuel	1981	2018	37 years	Trinidadian	footballer	car		High Legh, Cheshire, England, United Kingdom	Samuel was travelling home after taking his children to school on the morning of May 15, 2018, when he collided with a lorry and was killed.
Adán Sánchez	1984	2004	19 years	Mexican	singer	car (passenger)	1990 Lincoln Town Car	Sinaloa, Mexico	A tire blew causing the driver to lose control and rolled into a ditch. Sánchez died of his injuries in the hospital.
David Sánchez	1992	2017	25 years	Mexican	boxer	car		Hermosillo, Sonora, Mexico	Pre-dawn, driving at the speed, crashed into a highway.
Salvador Sánchez	1959	1982	23 years	Mexican	boxer	car	1981 Porsche 928	Mexican federal highway, north of Santiago de Querétaro	Pre-dawn, driving at high speed, crashed into a heavily loaded tractor-trailer.
Ray Sanders	1916	1983	66 years	American	baseball player	car		Washington, Missouri, US	
Richard Sanders	1945	1972	27 years	American	amateur wrestler	car	Land Rover	Skopje, Yugoslavia	Following the 1972 Olympic Games, Sanders began touring Europe. While hitchhiking to Greece, the vehicle he was riding in crashed head-on into a bus.
Keith Sanderson	1940	2022	82 years	British	footballer	car		Levens, Cumbria	
Maurie Sankey	1940	1965	25 years	Australian	Australian rules footballer	car		Wangaratta, Victoria, Australia	Head-on collision.
Maharajapuram Santhanam	1928	1992	63 years	Indian	guru and exponent of Indian classical music	car		Tindivanam, India	Santhanam died on June 24, 1992, in a car crash near Tindivanam.
Benoît Sauvageau	1963	2006	42 years	Canadian	politician and educator	car		Repentigny, Quebec, Canada	He was distracted by his cell phone use while driving, causing the crash.
Alexei Savin	1986	2007	21 years	Belarusian	ice hockey player	bicycle		Chelyabinsk, Russia	He was hit by a car while riding his bicycle.
Jessica Savitch	1947	1983	36 years	American	journalist	car	1982 Oldsmobile station wagon	Pennsylvania Canal (Delaware Division), US	In heavy rainfall, Savitch was a passenger in the back seat with her dog. The vehicle veered too far left and fell over the canal wall, landing upside-down and in deep mud. All inside were trapped and drowned.
Michele Scarponi	1979	2017	37 years	Italian	competitive cyclist	bicycle		Filottrano, Italy	He was cycling on a training ride on a road near his home town and was in a collision with a van at an intersection.
James Schaefer	1938	2018	79 years	American	politician	UTV		Kennebec, South Dakota, US	
Robert Schimmel	1950	2010	60 years	American	comedian	car (passenger)		Scottsdale, Arizona, US	Schimmel was being driven by his 19-year-old daughter Aliyah when the car veered off the road to avoid a collision with a passerby. The car flipped on its side and came to a stop at Loop 101 freeway. While Aliyah was in stable condition, Robert died in the hospital eight days later from his injuries.
Ursula Wolff Schneider	1906	1977	71 years	German, American	photojournalist	car			On August 4, 1977, she was killed in an automobile crash.
Josef Schnitzer	1939	1978	39 years	German	racing driver, founder and team manager of Schnitzer Motorsport	car	BMW 635 CSi	Murnau am Staffelsee, Bayern	Struck from behind when Schnitzer swerved to avoid another car in front who skidded off, causing it to roll over multiple times. Died on 31 August 1978, two weeks later without regaining consciousness.
Henry Schultz	1893	1938	45 years	American	economist	car		San Diego, California, US	
Chico Science	1966	1997	30 years	Brazilian	singer, songwriter	car		Recife, Pernambuco, Brazil	
Gaetano Scirea	1953	1989	36 years	Italian	footballer	car (passenger)	Polski Fiat 125p	Babsk, Poland	The car carrying him and three other people was hit from behind by a van. The track carried four canisters of gasoline, which exploded on impact, killing Scirea and two other passengers.
Caleb Scofield	1979	2018	39 years	American	bassist and singer (member of Cave In, Old Man Gloom and Zozobra)	car		Bedford, New Hampshire, US	
Ramblin' Tommy Scott	1917	2013	96 years	American	musician and vocalist	car		Toccoa, Georgia, US	
Malik Sealy	1970	2000	30 years	American	basketball player	SUV		St. Louis Park, Minnesota, US	He was on his way home from a birthday celebration when he collided with a truck, whose driver was drunk, and was killed.
W. G. Sebald	1944	2001	57 years	German	novelist	car		near Norwich, United Kingdom	Sebald suffered an aneurysm while driving and died of this condition before his car swerved across the road and collided with an oncoming truck. His daughter Anna survived the crash.
Mihail Sebastian	1907	1945	38 years	Romanian	writer	pedestrian		Bucharest, Romania	Hit by a truck.
Molefi Sefularo	1957	2010	52 years	South African	Deputy Minister of Health	car		N4, Pretoria, South Africa	
Ric Segreto	1952	1998	45 years	Filipino	singer (member of APO Hiking Society)	motorcycle		Makati, Philippines	
Raul Costa Seibeb	1992	2017	25 years	Namibian	cyclist	bicycle		Windhoek, Namibia	
Donald Sellers	1974	2001	26 years	American	football player	car		Wickenburg, Arizona, US	He lost control of the vehicle and crashed.
Frank Serafine	1953	2018	65 years	American	sound designer and editor	pedestrian		Palmdale, California, US	
Antonio Serapio	1937	2007	69 years	Filipino	lawmaker	car		Cabanatuan, Nueva Ecija, Philippines	Serapio was riding in car when it collided with another vehicle.
Luca Serianni	1947	2022	74 years	Italian	linguist	pedestrian		Ostia, Italy	Was crossing the street in a pedestrian crossing in Ostia when he was hit by a car and died.
Socks Seybold	1870	1921	51 years	American	baseball player	car		Greensburg, Pennsylvania, US	Overturned his car on a sharp curve.
John Nanzip Shagaya	1942	2018	75 years	Nigerian	politician	car		Amper, Kanke LGA Plateau State, Nigeria	
Abdul Shakoor	1968	2023	55 years	Pakistani	politician	car		Islamabad, Pakistan	While driving his vehicle from a hotel to Secretariat Chowk, Shakoor was struck by a Toyota Hilux Revo that had five passengers and struck Shakoor's side of his vehicle. Shakoor was airlifted to a hospital in the capital but died due to internal bleeding caused by the crash. 2 of the 5 men in the other vehicle were injured and all were arrested by police.
Mike Sharperson	1961	1996	34 years	American	baseball player	car		Las Vegas, Nevada, US	
Shawty Lo	1976	2016	40 years	American	rapper	car	Audi A7	Atlanta, Georgia, US	Collided with another vehicle.
Andrey Shcharbakow	1991	2018	27 years	Belarusian	footballer	car		Talachyn, Belarus	
Jack Shea	1910	2002	91 years	American	Olympic gold medalist speed skater (1932). Father of Olympic skier Jim Shea and grandfather of Olympic speed skater Jimmy Shea.	car		Saranac Lake, New York, US	Head-on collision with a drunk driver.
Dave Shean	1883	1963	79 years	American	baseball player	car		Boston, Massachusetts, US	
Jimmy Sheckard	1878	1947	68 years	American	baseball player	pedestrian		Lancaster, Pennsylvania, US	Struck by a car.
Alexander Fu Sheng	1954	1983	28 years	Hong Konger	martial arts actor	car (passenger)	Porsche 911 Targa	Clear Water Bay, Hong Kong	Collision with concrete wall.
Larisa Shepitko	1938	1979	41 years	Soviet Russian	film director	car		near Tver, Russia	
Samadagha Shikhlarov	1955	2021	65 years	Azerbaijani	footballer	car		Baku, Azerbaijan	
Sadamu Shimomura	1887	1968	80 years	Japanese	army general	car		Tokyo, Japan	
Gene Shoemaker	1928	1997	69 years	American	(astro)geologist and astronomer	car		Australia	Head-on collision on the Tanami Road near Alice Springs.
Alaa al-Siddiq	1988	2021	33 years	Emirati	human rights activist	car		Shipton-under-Wychwood, United Kingdom	
Obaid Siddiqi	1932	2013	81 years	Indian	biologist and academic	car		Bangalore, India	
Björn Sieber	1989	2012	23 years	Austrian	alpine skier	car		Schwarzenberg, Austria	
Karen Silkwood	1946	1974	28 years	American	labor activist	car	1974 Honda Civic	Crescent, Oklahoma, US	Silkwood's body was found in her car which had run off the road and struck a culvert. Some journalists have theorized that her car was rammed from behind by another vehicle with the intent to cause her death.
Elizete da Silva	1971	2017	46 years	Brazilian	heptathlon	car		Londrina, Brazil	
Trinidad Silva	1950	1988	38 years	American	Hill Street Blues actor	car		Whittier, California, US	Collided with a drunken driver.
Lew Simmons	1838	1911	73 years	American	baseball manager, vaudeville performer	pedestrian		Reading, Pennsylvania, US	While crossing a street, Simmons was struck by an ice wagon and then a beer truck.
Wayne Simmons	1969	2002	32 years	American	football player	car	Mercedes	Independence, Missouri, US	Simmons was killed in a single-car crash on Interstate 70. Witnesses report he was driving at high speed, weaving through traffic before losing control. The car rolled several times before landing in a ditch and catching fire.
Brian Simnjanovski	1981	2009	27 years	American	football player	car	Audi A4	San Diego, California, US	Simnjanovski was driving alone when his car left the road and collided with a tree.
Bob Simon	1941	2015	73 years	American	journalist	rental limousine (back seat passenger)	Lincoln Town Car	New York City, US	Crash occurred on West Side Highway of Manhattan, New York City. Simon's for-hire driver lost control, resulting in a collision with another vehicle. Simon was extracted from the roof of the limo by rescue workers and transported to St. Luke's–Roosevelt Hospital, where he later died after suffering a severe head trauma and a broken neck.
Gazmend Sinani	1991	2018	27 years	Kosovan	basketball player	car		Gjakova, Kosovo	
Rekha Sindhu	1995	2017	22 years	Indian	actress	car		Chennai, Bengaluru, India	
Lokendra Singh	1976	2018	41 years	Indian	politician	car		Sitapur, Uttar Pradesh, India	
Bjørn Skaare	1958	1989	30 years	Norwegian	ice hockey player	car		Sweden	
David J. Skal	1952	2024	71 years	American	author and film historian	car		Los Angeles, California, US	
Imogen Skirving	1937	2016	78 years	British	hotelier	car		Menorca, Balearic Islands, Spain	
Peter Slaghuis	1961	1991	30 years	Dutch	DJ, record producer and remixer	car		Amsterdam, Netherlands	
Paul Smart	1943	2021	78 years	English	short circuit motorcycle road racer	motorcycle	Ducati	Kent, England, United Kingdom	Collision with a car pulling an illegal U-turn in front while travelling on A21.
Bessie Smith	1894	1937	43 years	American	blues singer	car (passenger)		between Memphis, Tennessee, and Clarksdale, Mississippi, US	Smith was critically injured in a car crash while traveling along U.S. Route 61.
Darren Smith	1972	1992	20 years	Australian	cyclist	bicycle		Gold Coast road in Australia	Just months after competing at the Barcelona Olympics, Smith was killed in a crash while training.
Germany Smith	1863	1927	64 years	American	baseball player	pedestrian		Altoona, Pennsylvania, US	Struck by a car.
Horace Smith-Dorrien	1858	1930	72 years	British	soldier	car		Chippenham, Wiltshire, England, United Kingdom	
Nels J. Smith	1939	2023	84 years	American	politician	car	Chrysler minivan	U.S. 85 North of Lingle, Wyoming, US	Both Smith and his wife were driving on U.S. 85 when the vehicle crossed the center line and hit another vehicle head on. Both Smith and his wife, along with the other driver died at the scene.
Pete Smith	1944	2021	76 years	British	racing cyclist	bicycle		Leeds, West Yorkshire, England, United Kingdom	
Dan Snyder	1978	2003	25 years	Canadian	ice hockey player	car	Ferrari 360	Atlanta, Georgia, US	Sped at high speeds, lost control, and skidded into brick pillar. Snyder died from his injuries days later.
Bahattin Sofuoğlu	1978	2002	24 years	Turkish	motorcycle racer	pedestrian		Adapazarı, Turkey	
Sinan Sofuoğlu	1982	2008	25 years	Turkish	motorcycle racer	motorcycle		Körfez, Turkey	
Eddie Solomon	1951	1986	34 years	American	baseball pitcher	car		Macon, Georgia, US	
Sophan Sophiaan	1935	2008	73 years	Indonesian	actor, director, politician	motorcycle	Harley Davidson	Ngawi, Indonesia	
Chris Anker Sørensen	1984	2021	37 years	Danish	road bicycle racer	bicycle		Zeebrugge, Belgium	Struck by a van.
Dario Sorrentino	1957	2021	64 years	Italian	medical researcher	mountain bike		Alghero, Italy	
Red Sovine	1917	1980	62 years	American	country music singer	van	1979 Ford Econoline 150	Nashville, Tennessee, US	He suffered a heart attack while crossing an intersection and collided with another vehicle. He was pronounced dead when paramedics arrived.
Ferario Spasov	1962	2023	61 years	Bulgarian	footballer and manager	car		Bulgaria	Spasov's car was hit by a speeding Mercedes, sending him into oncoming lanes.
Rick Speare	1947	2016	68 years	Australian	public health physician	car		Atherton Tablelands, Australia	
Willie Spence	1999	2022	23 years	American	singer and television personality	car		Chattanooga, Tennessee, US	
Brunello Spinelli	1939	2018	78 years	Italian	water polo player	car		Florence, Italy	
Andy Spiva	1955	1979	24 years	American	football player	car		Atlanta, Georgia, US	Rainy conditions made for dangerous driving when he slid off a street and collided with a tree.
Robin Spry	1939	2005	65 years	Canadian	film director	car		Montreal, Quebec, Canada	
Aart Staartjes	1938	2020	81 years	Dutch	actor, director, television presenter and documentary maker	car		Groningen, Netherlands	
Clyde Stacy	1936	2013	77 years	American	singer	car		Muskogee, Oklahoma, US	
Burry Stander	1987	2013	25 years	South African	mountain biker	bicycle		Shelly Beach, South Africa	Collision with a taxibus
Francis Edgar Stanley	1849	1918	69 years	American	businessman, co-founder of the Stanley Motor Carriage Company	steam car	Stanley Steamer	Wenham, Massachusetts, US	He drove the car that he invented into a woodpile while attempting to avoid farm wagons traveling side by side on the road.
Leroy Stanton	1946	2019	72 years	American	baseball player	car		Florence County, South Carolina, United States	
Reverend Father Stanton	1880	1937	56 years	Canadian-American	Canadian football coach and missionary	car		near Cedar Springs, Michigan, US	
Victor Starffin	1916	1957	40 years	Japanese	baseball player	car		Tokyo, Japan	
William Stecher	1869	1926	57 years	American	baseball pitcher	car		Riverside Township, New Jersey, US	Struck by a Pennsylvania Railroad train at railroad crossing.
Wallace Stegner	1909	1993	84 years	American	Pulitzer Prize-winning author	car		Santa Fe, New Mexico, US	Died days after a crash.
John Steiner	1941	2022	81 years	English	actor			La Quinta, California, US	
Dick Stello	1934	1987	53 years	American	National League umpire	pedestrian		Lakeland, Florida, US	Crushed between two parked cars along a highway after one was struck by a third.
Nigel Stepney	1958	2014	55 years	British	race car mechanic, noted for the 2007 spying scandal	van	Volkswagen Caddy	M20 motorway, Ashford, Kent, England, United Kingdom	Collision with an articulated goods vehicle while parked on hard shoulder.
François Sterchele	1982	2008	26 years	Belgian	soccer player	car	Porsche Cayman S	Beveren, Belgium	He was speeding and lost control, crashing into a tree.
Billy Stewart	1937	1970	32 years	American	singer	car	Ford Thunderbird	near Smithfield, North Carolina, US	Approaching a bridge across the Neuse River near Smithfield, North Carolina, Stewart's car left the highway, ran along the median strip at a slight angle to the highway, struck the bridge abutment, and then plunged into the river, instantly killing Stewart and his three passengers, those being his band members.
Laura Stoica	1967	2006	38 years	Romanian	pop rock singer	car (passenger)		Sinești, Ialomița, Romania	
Theuns Stofberg	1955	2023	68 years	South African	rugby union player	car		outside Stellenbosch, South Africa	Stofberg succumbed to his injuries in hospital after a supposed head-on three vehicle accident that caused him multiple internal injuries. It is unknown who caused the accident.
Ljubiša "Louis" Stojanović	1952	2011	59 years	Serbian	singer	car		Feketić, Serbia	
Bryan Stoltenberg	1972	2013	40 years	American	football player	car		Sugar Land, Texas, US	
Angie Stone	1961	2025	63 years	American	R&B singer, member of The Sequence	van	Mercedes-Benz Sprinter	Montgomery, Alabama, US	
Lynn Strait	1968	1998	30 years	American	vocalist of Snot	car	1992 Ford Tempo	Highway 101, nSanta Barbara, California, US	
Boryana Straubel	1983	2021	38 years	Bulgarian	businesswoman and philanthropist	bicycle		Washoe Valley, Nevada, US	
Chris Street	1972	1993	20 years	American	college basketball player	car		Iowa City, Iowa	Collided with a snow plow.
Hannes Strydom	1965	2023	58 years	South African	rugby union player	car		Mpumalanga, South Africa	
Michel Subor	1935	2022	86 years	French	actor				
Major Kazimierz Suchecki	1931	1962	31 years	Polish	officer, military diplomat	car		U.S. Route 80, Madison County, Louisiana, US	Struck headon by a vehicle driven by the pastor of the Chinese Baptist Church in Cleveland who was attempting to pass another vehicle and was unable to get back in the lane of traffic.
Kollam Sudhi	1984	2023	39 years	Indian	actor	car		Kaipamangalam, India	Sudhi was in a car with three of his colleagues when their vehicle collided with a pickup truck. As a result, Sudhi suffered a fatal head injury that he succumbed to in a private hospital.
Charlie Sullivan	1903	1935	32 years	American	baseball player	car		Near Maiden, North Carolina, US	His car was struck by a train.
Joseph Michael Sullivan	1930	2013	83 years	American	priest	car			
Nora Sun	1937	2011	73 years	Chinese-American	diplomat	car		Taipei, Taiwan	
Ashwin Sundar	1985	2017	31 years	Indian	race driver	car	BMW	Chennai, Tamil Nadu, India	
Suparman	1913	1948	35 years	Indonesian	politician	car		Cirebon, State of Pasundan, Indonesia	
Josef Šural	1990	2019	28 years	Czech	footballer	minibus		Alanya, Turkey	He and six other players were being transported by minibus when they were involved in a crash. Šural died whereas his six teammates survived, but were still injured.
Martin Šustr	1990	2022	31 years	Czech	footballer	car			Collided with a truck and died from his injuries a few days later.
Lennart Svedberg	1944	1972	28 years	Swedish	ice hockey player	car		Timrå, Sweden	Collided with a bus.
Italo Svevo	1861	1928	66 years	Italian	writer	car		Motta di Livenza near Treviso, Italy	Died in a hospital the following day from the consequences of a crash.
Richard Swanson	1970	2013	42 years	American	tried to dribble a soccer ball from Seattle to São Paulo	pickup truck	Nissan	Lincoln City, Oregon, US	
Carla Swart	1987	2011	23 years	South African	cyclist	bicycle		South Africa	Hit by a truck while training.
Colin Sylvia	1985	2018	32 years	Australian	Australian rules footballer	car		Mildura, Victoria, Australia	The car Sylvia was driving collided with another vehicle.
Jennifer Syme	1972	2001	28 years	American	actress	SUV	1999 Jeep Grand Cherokee	Los Angeles, California, US	She died in a crash while returning home from a party at Marilyn Manson's home.
Andrew Symonds	1975	2022	46 years	Australian	cricketer	car		Hervey Range, Queensland, Australia	Symonds died from injuries sustained in a single vehicle crash.

== T ==
Name	Birth	Death	Aged	Nationality	Notability	Mode of transport	Vehicle	Crash location	Details
Ron Tabak	1953	1984	31 years	Canadian	Prism singer	bicycle		Vancouver, British Columbia, Canada	Struck by a passing vehicle, fell and hit his head on the pavement. ER doctors did not detect anything wrong with him initially. Upon being released, Tabak abruptly became abusive, prompting two police officers at the hospital to arrest him on the belief he was drunk. Later discovered unconscious in his jail cell, Tabak was rushed back to the hospital. A second examination discovered a blood clot had developed on the right side of his brain. Tabak died on Christmas Day 1984, before a pending neurosurgical operation could be performed.
Kiwako Taichi	1943	1992	48 years	Japanese	actress	car		Shizuoka, Japan	
Kouki Takahashi	1987	2011	23 years	Japanese	Grand Prix motorcycle racer	car		Higashimatsuyama, Saitama, Japan	
Tallys	1987	2017	30 years	Brazilian	attacking midfielder	car		Garopaba, Brazil	
Jamie Tape	1974	2003	28 years	Australian	Australian rules footballer	car		Adelaide, South Australia	He suffered a brain aneurysm while driving.
Najeeb Tarakai	1991	2020	29 years	Afghan	cricketer	pedestrian		Jalalabad, Afghanistan	He was hit by a car while crossing a road on October 2, 2020. He died four days later from a head injury sustained in the event.
Craig Tarry	1983	2016	32 years	British	manager of the rock band Viola Beach	car	Nissan Qashqai	Södertälje, Sweden	The car went through the barrier of a lifting bridge that had opened to let a boat go through, and plunged into the Södertälje Canal. All four members of the band, Jack Dakin, Kris Leonard, Tomas Lowe and River Reeves, were also killed.
Quindon Tarver	1982	2021	38 years	American	R&B singer	car		Dallas, Texas, US	
Doug Tassell	1945	1970	24 years	Australian	Australian rules footballer	car		Buangor, Victoria, Australia	
Oscar Taveras	1992	2014	22 years	Dominican	baseball player	car	2014 Chevrolet Camaro	Puerto Plata, Dominican Republic	The car ran off the road and hit a tree. The toxicology report indicated that Taveras' blood alcohol content was 5 times the country's legal limit.
Lord Taylor of Blackburn	1929	2016	87 years	British	life peer	mobility scooter		London, England	Collided with a van outside the Palace of Westminster, home of Britain's Parliament.
Ted Taylor	1934	1987	53 years	American	soul and R&B singer (The Cadets)	car		Lake Charles, Louisiana, US	
Terry Teene	1942	2012	70 years	American	singer	bicycle		Tyler, Texas, US	Terry died after the bicycle he was riding collided with a tow truck.
Buddy Teevens	1956	2023	66 years	American	football coach	bicycle		Florida, US	Teevens succumbed to injuries sustained in a March 2023 crash, in which he was hit by a Ford F150. He had severed his spinal cord and had his right leg amputated as a result of the crash. He died in Boston, Massachusetts in September 2023.
Gérandale Télusma	1972	2010	39 years	Haitian	lawyer and politician	car		Desdunes, Haiti	
Otilino Tenorio	1980	2005	25 years	Ecuadorian	footballer	car		Quevedo, Ecuador	The car in which he was travelling collided with a gas truck on the Santo Domingo-Quevedo road.
Antonia Terzi	1971	2021	50 years	Italian	aerodynamicist for cars	car		United Kingdom	
Frank Teschemacher	1906	1932	25 years	American	jazz musician	car		Chicago, Illinois, US	
Dumitru Tinu	1940	2003	62 years	Romanian	journalist	car	Volvo S40	Prahova County, Romania	At around 9.45 a.m., the car skidded out of the direction of travel and, after driving about 15–20 metres in the opposite lane, overturned in a deep ditch on the side of the road.
Elizabeth Thabethe	1959	2021	61 years	South African	politician	car		South Africa	
Thalles	1995	2019	24 years	Brazilian	footballer	motorcycle		Rio de Janeiro, Brazil	
Elriesa Theunissen-Fourie	1993	2019	25 years	South African	cricketer	car		Stilfontein, South Africa	
Trần Phước Thọ	1993	2016	23 years	Vietnamese	footballer	motorcycle		Long An, Vietnam	
Mary Thom	1944	2013	68 years	American	feminist	motorcycle		Yonkers, New York, US	
Derrick Thomas	1967	2000	33 years	American	football player (linebacker and defensive end)	SUV	1999 Chevrolet Suburban	Kansas City, Missouri, US	En route to Kansas City International Airport, Thomas, driving erratically and at high speed on a snow packed and icy road, went off Interstate 435. One of the two other passengers that were in the car died instantly; the other, the only occupant wearing his seat belt, walked away with minor injuries. Thomas was left paralyzed from the chest down and died from a pulmonary embolism in a Miami, Florida hospital two weeks later.
Diane Thomas	1946	1985	39 years	American	screenwriter	car (passenger)	Porsche 911 Carrera	Pacific Coast Highway, California, US	Her partner, who was driving her car, was intoxicated and was driving at 80 mph (130 km/h)when they crashed.
Larry Thomas	1936	1965	28 years	American	race car driver	car		Interstate 75, Georgia, US	He was on his way to a tire test when he drove off the highway and landed in an embankment, dying at the scene.
Meamea Thomas	1987	2013	25 years	I-Kiribati	weightlifter	car		Betio, Kiribati	
T. Ashton Thompson	1916	1965	49 years	American	U.S. Representative, Louisiana	car	Cadillac	Interstate 85, Gastonia, North Carolina, US	Thompson was pulled over for speeding by a North Carolina state trooper. While conversing with the trooper on the shoulder, an 18-wheeler lost control and slammed into Thompson and his vehicle, killing the Congressman. The occupants of Thompson's vehicle survived.
Richard Threlkeld	1937	2012	74 years	American	journalist	car	Mini	Amagansett, New York, US	
Danny Tidwell	1984	2020	35 years	American	dancer	car			
Mitchell Todd	1991	2012	21 years	Scottish	rugby union player	car		Normanton-on-the-Wolds, England, United Kingdom	
Braian Toledo	1993	2020	26 years	Argentinian	javelin thrower	motorcycle		Marcos Paz, Argentina	
Stacey Toran	1961	1989	27 years	American	football player (defensive back)	car	1984 BMW	Marina Del Rey, California, US	
Youcef Touati	1989	2017	27 years	French	footballer	car		A1 autoroute, France	
Thuy Trang	1973	2001	27 years	Vietnamese-American	actress	car (passenger)		near San Francisco, California, US	The driver of the vehicle Trang was riding in lost control, swerved into the roadside rock face and flipped several times before hitting the safety rail and plunging over the bank. Trang died of internal injuries before reaching the hospital.
Ranking Trevor	1960	2012	52 years	Jamaican	reggae musician	motorcycle		Kingston, Jamaica	
Thanasis Tribonias	1984	2012	28 years	Greek	footballer	motorcycle		Athens, Greece	
Nicola Trussardi	1942	1999	56 years	Italian	fashion designer and entrepreneur	car	Mercedes-Benz	near Milan, Italy	Trussardi was killed when he lost control of his vehicle, on Tangenziale Est of Milan and hit a lamp post in the early hours; dying the following day in Milan.
Mogau Tshehla	1992	2018	26 years	South African	footballer	car		Kwaggafontein, South Africa	
Viktor Tsoi	1962	1990	28 years	Soviet	musician, songwriter, and leader of the band Kino	car	Aleko	Latvian SSR, Soviet Union	Tsoi was driving on the Sloka – Talsi highway, near Tukums and Riga when his car collided with an oncoming Ikarus 250 bus. According to the official investigation, Tsoi fell asleep at the wheel while driving at a speed of at least 130 km/h.
Ben Tucker	1930	2013	82 years	American	jazz musician	car		Hutchinson Island, Georgia, US	
Cliff Tucker	1989	2018	29 years	American	basketball player	car		Balmorhea, Texas, US	
Hans Olav Tungesvik	1936	2017	81 years	Norwegian	politician	motorcycle		Bergen, Norway	Collided with car.
Davy Tweed	1959	2021	61 years	Northern Irish	politician and rugby union player	motorcycle		County Antrim, Northern Ireland, United Kingdom	
Judy Tyler	1932	1957	24 years	American	actress	car		Rock River, Wyoming, US	Tyler was killed instantly and her husband later died of his injuries in a crash on U.S. Route 30; a passenger in the other car also died.
Giora Tzahor	1941	2012	70 years	Israeli	military & officer	motorcycle		Hadera, Israel	

== U ==
Name	Birth	Death	Aged	Nationality	Notability	Mode of transport	Vehicle	Crash location	Details
Vaibhavi Upadhyay	1984	2023	38 years	Indian	actress	car		Kullu, Himachal Pradesh, India	In vehicle with her fiancé when it plummeted into a gorge.
Chinedu Udoji	1989	2018	28 years	Nigerian	footballer	car		Kano, Nigeria	
José Uribe	1959	2006	47 years	Dominican	baseball player	car		Juan Baron, Palenque, Dominican Republic	
Javier Urruticoechea	1952	2001	49 years	Spanish	footballer (goalkeeper)	car	Mercedes-Benz	B-20 or Ronda de Dalt, Barcelona, Spain	Impacted central barrier between exits 14 and 15.

== V ==
Name	Birth	Death	Aged	Nationality	Notability	Mode of transport	Vehicle	Crash location	Details
Vivian Vachon	1944	1991	47 years	Canadian	professional wrestler	car		near Montreal, Quebec, Canada	Her daughter, a passenger in Vachon's vehicle, also died in the crash.
Luis Valbuena	1985	2018	33 years	Venezuelan	baseball player (infielder)	car (passenger)		Yaracuy, Venezuela	The car he was riding in hit a fallen rock and went off the road. Fellow baseball player José Castillo died in the same incident.
Dickie Valentine	1929	1971	41 years	British	singer	car	Hillman Avenger	Glangrwyney, near Crickhowell, Wales, United Kingdom	
Johnny Valiant	1946	2018	71 years	American	professional wrestler	pedestrian		Pittsburgh, Pennsylvania, US	Hit by a pickup truck.
Jorma Valkama	1928	1962	34 years	Finnish	athlete	car	Volkswagen Beetle	Hollola, Päijät-Häme, Finland	His car collided with a van.
Edy Vásquez	1983	2007	23 years	Honduran	footballer	car		Tegucigalpa, Honduras	His car collided with a wall.
Ivo Van Damme	1954	1976	22 years	Belgian	middle-distance runner	car		Marseille, France	Van Damme was on his way home from a training camp in the south of France. For an unknown reason, his car crossed the median of the highway and collided head-on with an oncoming vehicle on the other road.
Dušan Velič	1966	2023	56 years	Slovak	chemist and politician	motorcycle		Bratislava, Slovakia	While riding his motorbike, Velič crashed into a car that had entered the road from an adjected parking lot.
Michael Ventris	1922	1956	34 years	British	the decipherer of Linear B	car		Hatfield, Hertfordshire, England, United Kingdom	
Yordano Ventura	1991	2017	25 years	Dominican	baseball player	SUV	Jeep Wrangler	Juan Adrián, Dominican Republic	
Krisztián Veréb	1977	2020	43 years	Hungarian	Olympic sprint canoer	motorcycle		Santo Domingo, Dominican Republic	
Jerzy Vetulani	1936	2017	81 years	Polish	neuroscientist	pedestrian		Balicka Street, Kraków, Poland	While walking home from work, Vetulani was hit by a car at a pedestrian crossing. He was put into an induced coma and died on April 6, 2017, in the hospital.
Emili Vicente	1965	2017	52 years	Spanish	footballer	motorcycle		Canòlic, Andorra	
Sanchari Vijay	1983	2021	37 years	Indian	actor	motorcycle		Bengaluru, India	
Lars Vilks	1946	2021	75 years	Swedish	visual artist	car (passenger)		Markaryd, Sweden	Vilks was traveling to Stocksund, Sweden in an unmarked police car when it crashed into a truck and burst into flames. The collision killed Vilks and the two police officers.
Ondřej Voříšek	1986	2004	18 years	Czech	footballer	car		Uherský Ostroh, Czech Republic	
Gordon Voss	1938	2017	79 years	American	politician	car		Wayzata, Minnesota, US	
Martin Vosseler	1948	2019	71 years	Swiss	co-founder of PSR	bicycle		Basel, Switzerland	Struck by a truck.

== W ==
Name	Birth	Death	Aged	Nationality	Notability	Mode of transport	Vehicle	Crash location	Details
Doreen Waddell	1965	2002	36 years	British	singer for Soul II Soul	pedestrian		Shoreham-By-Sea, West Sussex, England, United Kingdom	She was hit by three vehicles as she fled from a store in suspicion of shoplifting.
Roland Charles Wagner	1960	2012	51 years	French	writer	car		Bab El Oued, Algeria	
Sean Wainui	1995	2021	25 years	New Zealander	rugby union player	car		near Tauranga, New Zealand	He hit a tree.
Kōji Wakamatsu	1936	2012	76 years	Japanese	film director	pedestrian		Shinjuku, Tokyo, Japan	Wakamatsu was struck by a taxi in Tokyo on October 12, 2012, and died five days later.
Collin Walcott	1945	1984	39 years	American	jazz musician	bus		Magdeburg, Germany	
Andreas Waldherr	1968	2011	43 years	Austrian	rally driver	car	Volkswagen Polo	Aspang-Markt, Austria	
Billy Walker	1929	2006	77 years	American	country music singer	tour van		Interstate 65, Fort Deposit, Alabama, US	Three passengers in Walker's vehicle – his wife, Bettie, and two members of his band – were also killed. A fourth passenger survived with serious injuries.
Paul Walker	1973	2013	40 years	American	actor	car (passenger)	Porsche Carrera GT	Rye Canyon Loop, Santa Clarita, California, US	The driver, Roger Rodas, was also killed in the single-car crash. The vehicle caught fire and the bodies initially could not be identified.
Tray Walker	1992	2016	23 years	American	football player (cornerback)	dirt bike		Liberty City, Florida, US	
Jackie Walorski	1963	2022	58 years	American	politician	car		Nappanee, Indiana, US	
Wang Donglei	1985	2008	23 years	Chinese	footballer	car		Nanjing, Jiangsu, China	
Wang Kenan	1980	2013	33 years	Chinese	diver	car		Tianjin, China	
Wang You-theng	1927	2016	89 years	Taiwanese	entrepreneur	car		West Covina, California, US	
Chris von Wangenheim	1942	1981	39 years	German	fashion photographer	car		Saint Martin	
Pedrie Wannenburg	1981	2022	41 years	South African	rugby union player	car		Houston, Texas, US	Was hit by a vehicle driven by a 16-year-old fleeing a car chase in Houston. Pedrie and his son were airlifted to hospital while his wife and daughter did not suffer major injury.
Joe Ward	1884	1934	49 years	American	baseball player	car		Philadelphia, Pennsylvania, US	
Mary Ward	1827	1869	42 years	Irish	scientist	steam carriage (passenger)	experimental	Parsontown, Ireland	Thought to be the world's earliest road fatality.
Barbara Warren	1943	2008	65 years	American	triathlete	bicycle		Santa Barbara, California, US	
Marco Warren	1993	2023	29 years	Bermudian	footballer	pedestrian		Bermuda	Was a victim of a hit-and-run collision.
Marjory Warren	1897	1960	62 years	British	geriatric care pioneer	car		France	Died in a car crash on her way to a conference in Germany.
Jarmo Wasama	1943	1966	22 years	Finnish	ice hockey player	car		Kaleva, Pirkanmaa, Finland	Collided with a tractor.
Fred Washington	1967	1990	23 years	American	football player (defensive tackle)	car		Lake Forest, Illinois, US	
John L. Wasserman	1938	1979	40 years	American	columnist	car		South San Francisco, California, US	
Doug Watkins	1934	1962	27 years	American	jazz musician (double bass)	car		Holbrook, Arizona, US	
Ellen Watters	1988	2016	28 years	Canadian	cyclist	bicycle	car	Sussex, New Brunswick, Canada	
David Wayne	1958	2005	47 years	American	heavy metal singer (Metal Church and Reverend)	car		Tacoma, Washington, US	
Thomas Wayne	1940	1971	31 years	American	rockabilly singer	car		Memphis, Tennessee, US	
Daniel Webb	1989	2017	28 years	American	baseball player	ATV		Waverly, Tennessee, US	
Dottie West	1932	1991	58 years	American	country music singer	car		Briley Parkway, Nashville, Tennessee, US	While being driven to the Grand Ole Opry by a friend, and running late, she urged him to speed. The driver missed a turn and the car left the road. West was gravely injured and died five days later.
Grete Weiser	1903	1970	67 years	German	actress	car		Bad Tölz, Germany	Head-on collision with a truck.
Clayton Weishuhn	1959	2022	62 years	American	football player	car		Texas, US	Weishuhn was ejected from his vehicle and died after a one vehicle roll-over crash.
Nathanael West	1903	1940	37 years	American	writer	car		El Centro, California, US	He and his wife were returning home from a hunting trip in Mexico when the collision occurred.
Clarence White	1944	1973	29 years	Canadian-American	musician; Byrds' guitarist			Palmdale, California, US	Struck by a drunk driver while White and his brother Roland were loading musical equipment into their car.
Marjorie White	1904	1935	31 years	Canadian	actress	car (passenger)		Santa Monica, California, US	White was a passenger in a car, when it sideswiped another vehicle. The vehicle overturned and she died of injuries the next day.
Earl Whitehill	1899	1954	55 years	American	baseball player	car		Omaha, Nebraska, US	
Mark Whittow	1957	2017	60 years	British	archaeologist	car		Oxfordshire, England, UK	
Hyacinth Wijeratne	1946	2021	74 years	Sri Lankan	actress	van		Lindula, Sri Lanka	
Bluey Wilkinson	1911	1940	28 years	Australian	motorcycle speedway rider	motorcycle		Sydney, Australia	
Clarence Williams	1975	2022	47 years	American	football player			Crescent City, Florida, US	
Denny Williams	1896	1929	32 years	American	baseball player	car		San Clemente, California, US	Denny was returning home from spring training when the fatal car crash occurred.
Susan L. Williams	1951	2018	66 years	American	marine biologist	car		Petaluma, California, US	
Quentin Williams	1983	2023	39 years	American	politician	car		Route 9 in Cromwell, Connecticut, US	While driving late at night on Route 9 in Cromwell, Quentin was supposedly hit head on by another vehicle driving down the wrong way of the highway. He was one of two killed in the crash. Williams had just been sworn in for his third term in office as a state representative.
Treat Williams	1951	2023	71 years	American	actor	motorcycle	1986 Honda VT700C	near Dorset, Vermont, US	
Whayne Wilson	1975	2005	29 years	Costa Rican	footballer	car		San José, Costa Rica	Collided with a truck and died four days later in the hospital.
Carol Willis	1951	1971	20 years	American	Playboy Playmate	car		Laguna Beach, California, US	
Shahdon Winchester	1992	2019	27 years	Trinidadian	Footballer	car		Gasparillo, Trinidad and Tobago	
Gustav Winckler	1925	1979	53 years	Danish	singer and composer	car		Viborg, Denmark	
Al Wingo	1898	1964	66 years	American	baseball player	truck		Lincoln Park, Michigan, US	
Jorn Winther		2018	88 years	Danish-American	director	car			
Wiris Gustavo de Oliveira	2000	2023	23 years	Brazilian	footballer	car		Lima Duarte, Minas Gerais, Brazil	
Bob Wollek	1943	2001	57 years	French	race car driver	bicycle		U.S. Route 98, Florida, US	Collided with a van.
Harry Wolverton	1873	1937	63 years	American	baseball player	pedestrian		Oakland, California, US	While on patrol as an officer with the Oakland Police Department, Wolverton was struck and killed by a hit-and-run driver.
John Woods	1898	1946	48 years	American	baseball player	car		Norfolk, Virginia, US	While serving as Chief of Norfolk Police, Woods crashed while responding to a vehicle accident.
Christopher Worrell	1954	1977	23 years	Australian	serial killer (Truro Murders)	car		Truro, South Australia, Australia	While abducting a woman named Deborah Skuse, Worrell was driving to Adelaide. The car blew a tire and rolled over several times, killing Skuse and Worrell.
Freda Wright-Sorce	1955	2005	50 years	American	radio personality	car		Ocean City, Maryland, US	She died as a result of injuries sustained in an automobile crash on Maryland Route 90.
Wu Jianmin	1939	2016	77 years	Chinese	diplomat	car		Wuhan, China	
Rolf Wütherich	1927	1981	53 years	German	James Dean's passenger during his fatal crash	car	Honda Civic	Kupferzell, Germany	Was DUI when he fatally crashed.
N. C. Wyeth	1882	1945	62 years	American	artist and illustrator	car		Chadds Ford, Pennsylvania, US	Wyeth and his grandson died in a collision at a railway crossing near his Chadds Ford home.
Charles Wyly	1933	2011	77 years	American	Businessman	car	Porsche Targa	Near Aspen, Colorado, US	Wyly was turning onto a highway near the local airport when his Porsche was hit by a SUV according to the Colorado State Highway Patrol.
Khalid Shameem Wynne	1953	2017	64 years	Pakistani	military officer	car	SUV	Chakri, Punjab, India	

== Y ==
Name	Birth	Death	Aged	Nationality	Notability	Mode of transport	Vehicle	Crash location	Details
Saksham Yadav	1989	2018	28 years	Indian	powerlifter	car	Suzuki Dzire	Delhi–Panipat Highway	
Hiromi Yanagihara	1979	1999	19 years	Japanese	Country Musume singer	car		Nakasatsunai, Hokkaido, Japan	Yanagihara was killed in a car crash one week before the group Hello! Project's first release, Futari no Hokkaidou.
Anton Yelchin	1989	2016	27 years	American	actor	SUV	Jeep Grand Cherokee	Los Angeles, California, United States	As Yelchin got out of his car and went to check his locked gate for mail, the vehicle rolled back down his driveway, which was on a steep incline, and trapped him against the pillar and a security fence.
Mikhail Yeremin	1968	1991	23 years	Soviet	footballer	car		Zelenograd, Russia (formal part of Soviet Union)	
Yevhen Yevseyev	1987	2011	24 years	Ukrainian	football	car		Kalush, Ivano-Frankivsk Oblast, Ukraine	
Gunpei Yokoi	1941	1997	56 years	Japanese	Nintendo executive	stationary		Nomi, Ishikawa Prefecture, Japan	He was in a car driven by his associate Etsuo Kiso, when the car rear-ended a truck. They got out to inspect the damage, and Yokoi was hit and fatally injured by a passing car.
B. J. Young	1977	2005	28 years	American	ice hockey player	car		Vancouver, British Columbia, Canada	
Buddy Young	1926	1983	57 years	American	football player	car		Terrell, Texas, US	Young lost control of his car, which came to rest in a creekbed about 300 feet (90 m) off Interstate Highway 20.
Cliff Young	1964	1993	29 years	American	baseball pitcher	car		Montgomery County, Texas, US	He went off the road and hit a tree, dying instantly.
Galen Young	1975	2021	45 years	American	basketball player	stationary		Memphis, Tennessee, US	He was staying at his mother's house when a car crashed through the wall and into the room where he was. He was found dead under the debris.

== Z ==
Name	Birth	Death	Aged	Nationality	Notability	Mode of transport	Vehicle	Crash location	Details
Serhiy Zakarlyuka	1976	2014	38 years	Ukrainian	footballer	car		Poltava, Ukraine	The crash injured a teammate who was a passenger.
Călin Zanc	1971	2014	43 years	Romanian	footballer	car		Jichișu de Jos, Romania	He lost control and crashed into a fence.
Giacomo Zani	1932	2021	89 years	Italian	conductor and musicologist	car	Subaru	Casalmaggiore, Italy	He lost control and crashed into a lamppost.
Jeffrey Zaslow	1958	2012	53 years	American	author and journalist	car		Warner Township, Michigan, US	
Anatoliy Zayayev	1931	2012	81 years	Ukrainian	football and coach	car	Honda CR-V	Melitopol, Ukraine	
Eric Zentner	1981	2011	30 years	American	fashion model	car		Buellton, Santa Barbara County, US	Died as the result of a hit and run incident.
Hicham Zerouali	1977	2004	27 years	Moroccan	footballer	car		Rabat, Morocco	
Aleksandr Zhirov	1958	1983	24 years	Russian	alpine skier	car		near Yakhroma, Moscow Oblast, Russia	
Claudia Zobel	1964	1984	19 years	Filipina	actress	car		Makati, Philippines	
Vano Zodelava	1957	2019	61 years	Georgian	politician	car		Tbilisi, Soviet Union	

== See also ==
- List of deaths by motorcycle crash
- List of racing cyclists and pacemakers with a cycling-related death
- List of racing drivers who died in racing crashes
- Lists of people by cause of death
