= Deaths in June 2013 =

The following is a list of notable deaths in June 2013.

Entries for each day are listed alphabetically by surname. A typical entry lists information in the following sequence:

- Name, age, country of citizenship and reason for notability, established cause of death, reference.

== June 2013 ==
=== 1 ===
- Oliver Bernard, 87, English poet and translator.
- Newbold Black, 83, American Olympic hockey player.
- William Cartwright, 92, American Emmy Award-winning film documentarian and editor, conservationist of the Watts Towers, natural causes.
- Frank Dempsey, 88, American football player (Chicago Bears, Hamilton Tiger-Cats).
- Carl Elsener Sr., 90, Swiss entrepreneur.
- Jelena Genčić, 76, Serbian handball and tennis player and coach.
- Mott Green, 47, American chocolatier, co-founder of the Grenada Chocolate Company, electrocuted.
- Bill Gunston, 86, British aviation writer.
- Ian P. Howard, 85, Canadian psychologist, cancer.
- James Kelleher, 82, Canadian politician, MP for Sault Ste. Marie (1984–1988), member of the Senate (1990–2005), heart failure.
- Atle Kittang, 72, Norwegian literary researcher and critic.
- Hanfried Lenz, 97, German mathematician.
- Joseph-André Motte, 88, French furniture designer.
- Alixa Naff, 93, Lebanese-born American historian, expert on Arab immigration to the United States.
- Dorothy Napangardi, 60s, Australian indigenous artist, traffic collision.
- Paul Olefsky, 87, American cellist (Philadelphia Orchestra, Detroit Symphony Orchestra).
- Joan Parkins, 90, Canadian figure skater.
- Leo Piek, 85, Dutch Olympic wrestler.
- Jane Purves, 63, Canadian politician and newspaper editor (Halifax Chronicle Herald), Nova Scotia MLA for Halifax Citadel (1999–2003), cancer.
- Edward Cornelius Reed Jr., 88, American senior (former chief) judge, District Court for Nevada (since 1979), natural causes.
- Sir Bernard Schreier, 95, Austrian-born British businessman.
- Basil Soper, 74–75, British actor.
- Janie Thompson, 91, American missionary and academic.

=== 2 ===
- Mario Bernardi, 82, Canadian conductor and pianist.
- Bruce Cathie, 83, New Zealand UFO author and theorist.
- Marco Frascari, 68, Italian architect.
- Chen Xitong, 84, Chinese politician, Mayor of Beijing, cancer.
- Andrew Doughty, 96, British anaesthetist.
- John Gilbert, Baron Gilbert, 86, British politician and life peer, MP for Dudley (1970–1974), Dudley East (1974–1997) and Minister for Transport (1975–1976).
- Margaret Jackson, 96, British Special Operations Executive secretary.
- Nick Keir, 60, Scottish musician, cancer.
- Sverre Magelssen, 95, Norwegian priest.
- Frank J. Magill, 86, American federal judge, member of the Eighth Circuit Court of Appeals.
- Rob Morsberger, 53, American rock and roll singer and songwriter, glioblastoma.
- Togrul Narimanbekov, 83, Azerbaijani artist.
- Ron Smith, 70, American football player (Chicago Bears, Atlanta Falcons, Los Angeles Rams), lung cancer.
- Jalaleddin Taheri, 87, Iranian Islamic cleric.
- Preston Ward, 85, American baseball player (Pittsburgh Pirates, Cleveland Indians, Kansas City Athletics).
- Keith Wilson, 96, American classical musician, teacher and conductor.
- Mandawuy Yunupingu, 56, Australian musician (Yothu Yindi), kidney disease.

=== 3 ===
- Yves Bertrand, 69, French intelligence chief (Renseignements Généraux, 1992–2004).
- Will D. Campbell, 88, American Baptist minister, civil rights leader, author and lecturer, complications of a stroke.
- Atul Chitnis, 51, German-born Indian IT specialist, open source advocate and editor of PCQuest, intestinal cancer.
- Józef Czyrek, 84, Polish politician.
- MickDeth, 35, American heavy metal bassist (Eighteen Visions, Bleeding Through), pre-existing heart condition.
- G. R. Edmund, 82, Indian politician, Tamil Nadu MLA for Tiruchendur and Tirunelveli, multiple organ failure.
- Arnold Eidus, 90, American violinist.
- Howard Grief, 73, Canadian–born Israeli attorney.
- Shahnaz Himmeti, Afghani politician, MP for Herat, traffic collision.
- Eugênio Izecksohn, 81, Brazilian herpetologist (Izecksohn's Toad), professor and author.
- Deacon Jones, 74, American Hall of Fame football player (Los Angeles Rams), coined the term "sack", natural causes.
- Farid Khan, Pakistani politician, Khyber Pakhtunkhwa MLA for Hangu, shot.
- Jiah Khan, 25, American-born Indian actress, suicide by hanging.
- Frank Lautenberg, 89, American politician, member of the United States Senate for New Jersey (1982–2001, since 2003), complications of pneumonia.
- Enrique Lizalde, 76, Mexican actor.
- Vbos The Kentuckian, 11, Flat-Coated Retriever show dog, respiratory failure.
- Stanley T. Walker, 90, American Olympic biathlete.

=== 4 ===
- Walt Arfons, 96, American land speed record holder.
- Martin Arnold, 84, American journalist, editor and columnist (The New York Times), complications of Parkinson's disease.
- Auguste Cazalet, 74, French politician, Senator for Pyrénées-Atlantiques.
- Rudy Clay, 77, American politician, member of the Indiana Senate (1972–1976), Mayor of Gary, Indiana (2006–2011), prostate cancer.
- Joey Covington, 67, American musician (Jefferson Airplane, Hot Tuna), traffic collision.
- John Crawley, 73, American judge, member of the Alabama Court of Civil Appeals (1995–2007).
- Monti Davis, 54, American basketball player (Philadelphia 76ers, Dallas Mavericks).
- Hermann Gunnarsson, 66, Icelandic broadcaster, footballer and handball player.
- Pekka Hämäläinen, 74, Finnish football player and executive, President of the Football Association of Finland (1997–2009).
- John B. Heilman, 92, American politician, member of the South Dakota House of Representatives (1953–1954).
- Carlos Hoffmann, 77, Chilean footballer.
- Gaston Isabelle, 92, Canadian doctor and politician, MP for Hull—Aylmer (1968–1988).
- Austin M. Lee, 93, American politician, member of the Pennsylvania House of Representatives (1956–1964), Pennsylvania State Ethics Commission (1991–2001).
- Luo Meizhen, 127?, Chinese unverified claimant for world's oldest person, natural causes.
- Sir Patrick Nairne, 91, British civil servant, Permanent Secretary to the Department of Health and Social Security (1975–1981).
- Zinia Pinto, 83, Indian Roman Catholic nun and educationalist.
- Samani Pulepule, 89, Samoan religious leader, Chairman of the Samoan Assemblies of God.
- S. Shamsuddin, 84, Singaporean actor.
- Ben Tucker, 82, American jazz musician, traffic collision.
- Will Wynn, 64, American football player (Philadelphia Eagles), heart failure.

=== 5 ===
- Sir James Bottomley, 92, British diplomat, Ambassador to South Africa (1973–76).
- Don Bowman, 75, American comedian, country singer and songwriter ("Just to Satisfy You").
- Dave Elias, 43, Canadian curler, liver cancer.
- Takkō Ishimori, 81, Japanese voice actor (One Piece, Magic Knight Rayearth).
- Kampta Karran, 56, Guyanese sociologist and author.
- Franz Kelch, 97, German singer.
- Hermann Lotter, 73, German Olympic swimmer.
- Helen McElhone, 80, British politician, MP for Glasgow Queen's Park (1982–83).
- Scarlet Moon de Chevalier, 62, Brazilian actress, journalist and writer, multiple system atrophy.
- Stanisław Nagy, 91, Polish Roman Catholic prelate, Cardinal of Santa Maria della Scala (since 2003).
- Lonappan Nambadan, 77, Indian politician, kidney ailment.
- Ruairí Ó Brádaigh, 80, Irish politician, TD for Longford–Westmeath (1957–61), President of Sinn Féin (1970–83) and Republican Sinn Féin (1987–2009).
- Michel Ostyn, 88, Belgian sports scientist.
- Balan Pandit, 86, Indian cricketer.
- Annabel Tollman, 39, Belgian-born American fashion journalist and magazine editor, blood clot.
- Katherine Woodville, 74, English-born American actress (Posse, The Informers), cancer.

=== 6 ===
- Erling Blöndal Bengtsson, 81, Danish cellist.
- Stan Gorton, 67, Australian rugby league footballer.
- Elmer Guckert, 84, American baseball umpire.
- Mohamed Hachaichi, 62, Algerian Olympic wrestler.
- Nada Inada, 83, Japanese psychiatrist and writer.
- Jerome Karle, 94, American biochemist, Nobel Prize laureate (1985), member of the Manhattan Project.
- Elaine Laron, 83, American songwriter and lyricist (The Electric Company, Captain Kangaroo), pneumonia.
- Rafael Marquina, 91, Spanish inventor, designer and architect.
- Jeffrey Mathews, 70, South African cricketer.
- Jack McGrath, 89, Australian footballer.
- Eugen Merzbacher, 92, German-born American physicist.
- Gennady Nikolayev, 76, Russian Soviet Olympic swimmer.
- Jules Schwartz, 85, American computer scientist.
- Tom Sharpe, 85, British author (Porterhouse Blue, Wilt), complications from diabetes.
- Maxine Stuart, 94, American actress (Kitten with a Whip, Days of Wine and Roses), natural causes.
- Malcolm Todd, 73, British historian and archaeologist.
- Esther Williams, 91, American swimmer (Billy Rose's Aquacade) and actress (Million Dollar Mermaid, Dangerous When Wet), natural causes.

=== 7 ===
- Rachel Abrams, 62, American writer, editor and artist, wife of Elliott Abrams, stomach cancer.
- Akeyuth Anchanbutr, 58, Thai businessman and political activist, homicide.
- Lesley Cantwell, 26, New Zealand racewalker, suspected subarachnoid haemorrhage.
- Mirosław Car, 52, Polish footballer.
- Charlie Coles, 71, American basketball coach (Central Michigan University, 1985–1991; Miami University, 1996–2012).
- Harvey Dunn Jr., 81, Australian football player (Carlton).
- Tom Fitzgerald, 74, Irish politician, member of the Seanad Éireann.
- Donna Hartley, 58, English Olympic bronze medallist runner (1980).
- Ken Kinkor, 59, American pirate historian (Whydah Galley).
- David Lyon, 72, British actor.
- Pierre Mauroy, 84, French politician, Prime Minister (1981–1984), member of Senate for Nord (1992–2011), lung cancer.
- Christopher Pearson, 61, Australian journalist, political speech-writer, founder of the Adelaide Review.
- J. V. Raghavulu, 82, Indian playback singer and musical director.
- Richard Ramirez, 53, American serial killer, complications from B-cell lymphoma and hepatitis-C.
- Malu Rocha, 65, Brazilian actress, prion.
- Mark Starr, 50, American professional wrestler, heart attack.
- Kenneth R. Shoulders, 86, American experimental physicist.
- Joseph Michael Sullivan, 83, American Roman Catholic prelate, Auxiliary Bishop of Brooklyn (1980–2005), injuries sustained in a traffic collision.
- Juan Ignacio Torres Landa, 57, Mexican politician, President of the Chamber of Deputies (1992), helicopter crash.
- Amelia Wood, 82, American Olympic javelin thrower.

=== 8 ===
- John Boyd, 93, American science fiction author.
- Paul Cellucci, 65, American politician and diplomat, Governor of Massachusetts (1997–2001), Ambassador to Canada (2001–2005), amyotrophic lateral sclerosis.
- Harold J. Cromer, 92, American comedian and dancer (Stump and Stumpy, DuBarry Was a Lady).
- Nathan Dean, 79, American politician, member of the Georgia House of Representatives (1962–1974) and Senate (1974–2004).
- Niels Diffrient, 84, American industrial designer, cancer.
- Charles M. Hudson, 80–81, American anthropologist.
- Beril Jents, 95, Australian fashion designer.
- Yoram Kaniuk, 83, Israeli writer, painter, journalist, and theater critic, cancer.
- Taufiq Kiemas, 70, Indonesian politician, Speaker of the People's Consultative Assembly (since 2009), heart attack.
- Jaimie Leonard, 39, American soldier, arms-related injury.
- Raymond McCormick, 82, Australian cricketer.
- Angus MacKay, 86, British actor (Doctor Who).
- Kyle Miller, 31, Canadian lacrosse player, cancer.
- Hugh Murray, 90, British historian.
- Ahad Rajabli, 51, Azerbaijani martial artist, world champion in sambo, suicide by hanging.
- Eugene P. Ruehlmann, 88, American politician, Mayor of Cincinnati (1967–1971).
- Richard J. Seitz, 95, American army officer.
- Udham Singh, Indian Maoist militant, shot.
- Willi Sitte, 92, German painter.
- Evert Sodergren, 92, American studio furniture maker.
- José Sosa, 60, Dominican baseball player (Houston Astros).
- Dobbo Townshend, 69, Zimbabwean cricketer.
- Arturo Vega, 65, Mexican-born American punk graphic designer and artistic director (The Ramones), cancer.
- Philip White, 89, Canadian politician, Mayor of York, Ontario (1970–1978).

=== 9 ===
- Iain Banks, 59, Scottish author (The Wasp Factory), gallbladder cancer.
- Bruno Bartoletti, 86, Italian conductor.
- Martin Bernal, 76, British scholar, myelofibrosis.
- Ralph Bogan, 90, American businessman and part-owner of the Atlanta Braves.
- John Burke, 65, British rugby league player.
- Darondo, 67, American soul singer, heart failure.
- Wahab Dosunmu, 74, Nigerian politician, member of the Senate (1999–2003).
- K. T. Francis, 73, Sri Lankan cricket umpire, complications of diabetes.
- Ward Goodenough, 94, American anthropologist.
- J. Eugene Grigsby, 94, American educator.
- Franz Halberg, 93, Romanian biologist.
- Walter Jens, 90, German writer and intellectual, dementia.
- Harry Lewis, 93, American actor (Key Largo) and restaurateur, natural causes.
- Noel McMahon, 97, New Zealand cricketer.
- Chechenol Mongush, 41, Russian Olympic wrestler (1996), strangled.
- Solomon Oboh, 23, Nigerian footballer (Warri Wolves), traffic collision.
- Rudolf Pöder, 88, Austrian politician, President of the National Council (1989–1990).
- Elías Querejeta, 78, Spanish film producer.
- Zdeněk Rotrekl, 92, Czech poet.
- Dilip Sarkar, 64, Indian politician, West Bengal MLA for Barabani, shot.
- Seong Moy, 92, Chinese-born American painter and printmaker.
- Edward Stevens, 80, American Olympic gold medal-winning rower (1952).
- Joe Tereshinski Sr., 89, American football player (Washington Redskins).
- Edith Thomas, 86, Chilean Olympic javelin thrower.

=== 10 ===
- Timothy Apiyo, 70s, Tanzanian politician and civil servant.
- Doug Bailey, 79, American political consultant.
- Ernst H. Beutner, 89, American microbiologist.
- Jacques Bialski, 83, French politician, member of the Senate for Nord (1979–1997).
- Gladys Clarke, 90, British javelin thrower.
- Valentin de Vargas, 79, American actor (Touch of Evil, Hatari!, To Live and Die in L.A.).
- Allen Derr, 85, American lawyer, won Reed v. Reed sex discrimination case.
- Jack Dye, 93, British army officer.
- Ralph Graves, 88, American writer, editor and news executive (Time, Life), kidney failure.
- Franz Handlos, 73, German politician, MP for Deggendorf (1972–1987).
- Petrus Kastenman, 88, Swedish Olympic equestrian (1956).
- Alice Kundert, 92, American politician, member of the South Dakota House of Representatives (1990–1994), Secretary of State of South Dakota (1979–1987).
- Louis-Paul M'Fédé, 52, Cameroonian Olympic footballer, lung infection.
- Ali Maher, 55, Jordanian artist, architect and teacher, stroke.
- Yehoshua Neuwirth, 86, Israeli Jewish scholar and clergy, compiled the Shemirat Shabbat Kehilchatah.
- Hector Oaxaca Acosta, 87, Mexican news photographer (Associated Press).
- Enrique Orizaola, 91, Spanish footballer.
- M. K. Purushothaman, 51, Indian politician, Kerala MLA for Njarackal (2006–2011), heart attack.
- Don Roby, 79, English footballer (Notts County F.C., Loughborough United).
- Daniel Somers, 30, American soldier, suicide by gunshot.
- Pete Vonachen, 87, American baseball team owner and executive (Peoria Chiefs).
- Barbara Vucanovich, 91, American politician, member of the United States House of Representatives from Nevada's 2nd district (1983–1997).

=== 11 ===
- Miller Barber, 82, American professional golfer, lymphoma.
- Carl W. Bauer, 79, American politician, member of the Louisiana House of Representatives (1966–1972) and Senate (1972–1976).
- Sir Henry Cecil, 70, British racehorse trainer, stomach cancer.
- John Frederick Clarke, 86, British aeronautical engineer.
- Robert Fogel, 86, American economic academic, winner of the Nobel Memorial Prize in Economic Sciences (1993).
- James Grimsley Jr., 91, American military officer and academic, President of The Citadel (1980–1989).
- Andreas Kilingaridis, 36, Russian-born Greek Olympic kayaker (2000, 2004, 2008), leukaemia.
- Olavio López Duque, 81, Colombian Roman Catholic prelate, Vicar Apostolic of Casanare (1977–1999).
- Murray Mitchell, 90, American basketball player.
- Rory Morrison, 48, British radio announcer and newsreader (BBC Radio 4), lymphoma.
- Aleksandr Nalivkin, 26, Russian footballer, cancer.
- Kristiāns Pelšs, 20, Latvian ice hockey player, drowning.
- Stephen Porter, 87, American stage director.
- Vidya Charan Shukla, 84, Indian politician, MP for Mahasamund, Minister of External Affairs (1990–1991), injuries sustained in a shooting.
- Johnny Smith, 90, American jazz guitarist and songwriter ("Walk, Don't Run"), natural causes.
- Charles Spielberger, 85–86, American clinical psychologist.
- Thyra Thomson, 96, American politician, Secretary of State of Wyoming (1963–1987).
- Jaakko Wallenius, 55, Finnish writer and journalist.
- Billy Williams, 80, American baseball player (Seattle Pilots).

=== 12 ===
- Laslo Babits, 55, Canadian Olympic javelin thrower (1984).
- Teresita Barajuen, 105, Spanish Roman Catholic laity, believed to hold record for longest service in cloister.
- Elroy Chester, 44, American criminal, execution by lethal injection.
- Fatai Rolling Dollar, 86, Nigerian musician.
- John Groppo, 92, American politician, member of the Connecticut House of Representatives (1959–1985).
- Hugo Gutierrez Jr., 86, Filipino jurist, Associate Justice of the Supreme Court (1982–1993), complications of diabetes.
- Helen Brush Jenkins, 94, American news photographer (Los Angeles Daily News).
- Michael Kasha, 92, American molecular biophysicist, complications of pneumonia.
- Jiroemon Kimura, 116, Japanese supercentenarian, verified oldest man in history, oldest verified living person in the world, natural causes.
- Jason Leffler, 37, American racing driver (NASCAR, IndyCar), blunt force neck injury from race collision.
- José de Lima, 89, Brazilian Roman Catholic prelate, Bishop of Itumbiara (1973–1981) and Sete Lagoas (1981–1999).
- Dick Mansperger, 80, American football player and coach, cancer.
- Ethel Marshall, 89, American badminton player.
- Teodoro Matos Santana, 66, Brazilian footballer (São Paulo FC), pancreatic cancer.
- Pa Odiase, 79, Nigerian composer ("Arise, O Compatriots").
- Cheryl Peake, 47, British Olympic ice skater (1988).
- Soh Hang-suen, 61, Hong Kong actress (Life Without Principle), complications of diabetes and stroke.
- Gavin Taylor, 72, British television and concert film director, (The Tube, U2 at Red Rocks, Queen at Wembley), cancer.
- Barry Till, 90, British scholar and educator.
- Joseph A. Unanue, 88, American chief executive (Goya Foods).

=== 13 ===
- Mohammed Al-Khilaiwi, 41, Saudi Olympic and World Cup footballer (1994, 1998), cardiac arrest.
- Ángel Bello, 62, Argentine Olympic archer (1988).
- David Deutsch, 84, American advertising executive, founder and CEO of Deutsch Inc. (1969–1989), natural causes.
- Newton Lai, 62, Chinese Hong Kong actor, pneumonia.
- Philippe Massu, 60, French sailor (sport).
- Sam Most, 82, American jazz flautist, cancer.
- Ajit Pandey, 75, Indian pop singer and politician, West Bengal MLA for Bowbazar, heart attack.
- Edmund Pellegrino, 92, American bioethicist and academic, President of The Catholic University of America (1978–1982).
- Maxwell Nicholas Sparks, 92, New Zealand air force officer.
- Brett Usher, 66, English actor, writer and ecclesiastical historian, pancreatic cancer.
- Kenji Utsumi, 75, Japanese voice actor (Fist of the North Star, Dragon Ball, Fullmetal Alchemist), cancerous peritonitis.
- Albert White Hat, 74, American Lakota language teacher and activist.

=== 14 ===
- Betty Burstall, 87, Australian theatre director, founder of La Mama Theatre.
- Rod Bushie, 60, Canadian Anishinaabe elder, Grand Chief of Assembly of Manitoba Chiefs (1997–2000), lung cancer.
- Olav Sigurd Carlsen, 82, Norwegian politician.
- Geraldine Decker, 82, American operatic mezzo-soprano (Seattle Opera, Metropolitan Opera).
- Pa Dillon, 75, Irish hurler.
- Al Green, 57, American professional wrestler (WCW), chronic obstructive pulmonary disease.
- Johnny Linaker, 86, English footballer.
- Martin Lowson, 75, English aeronautical engineer.
- Hugh Maguire, 86, Irish violinist.
- Gene Mako, 97, American tennis player, doubles winner at US Open (1936, 1938) and Wimbledon (1937, 1938), inducted into International Tennis Hall of Fame (1973).
- James W. Mayer, 83, American applied physicist.
- Monica Ross, 62, British artist, academic, and feminist, cancer.
- Elroy Schwartz, 89, American television writer (Gilligan's Island, The Brady Bunch, Wonder Woman), complications from surgery.
- Tom Tall, 75, American rockabilly singer.
- Olwen Wymark, 81, American-born British dramatist.

=== 15 ===
- Kamu de Almeida, 73, Angolan diplomat, Ambassador to the Congo, Spain and Egypt.
- Tatiana Belinky, 94, Russian-born Brazilian children's author, poet, screenwriter (Sítio do Pica-pau Amarelo, O Jardineiro Espanhol) and journalist, Prêmio Jabuti laureate (1990, 1994).
- Peride Celal, 97, Turkish author.
- Satyapal Dang, 93, Indian politician, Punjab MLA for Amritsar West (1967–1980).
- Heinz Flohe, 65, German footballer (1. FC Köln), member of World Cup-winning team (1974), complications from a stroke.
- Edgar Gilbert, 89, American mathematician.
- José Froilán González, 90, Argentine racing driver, respiratory failure.
- Doreen Hawkins, 93, British actress.
- Joseph Hibbert, 65, Jamaican politician, MP for St. Andrew East Rural (2002–2011), Minister for Transport and Works, heart attack.
- Helen Hughes, 84, Czech-born Australian economist, complications following surgery.
- Elena Ivashchenko, 28, Russian Olympic judoka, suicide by jumping.
- Thomas Penfield Jackson, 76, American senior judge, member of the US District Court for D.C. (1982–2004), cancer.
- Stanley A. Johnson, 88, American politician, member of the South Dakota House of Representatives (1968–1977).
- Walter Kahn, 65, American record producer, kidney failure.
- Sakaida Kakiemon XIV, 78, Japanese potter, Living National Treasure, cancer.
- Stan Lopata, 87, American baseball player (Philadelphia Phillies), complications of a cardiac condition.
- Manivannan, 58, Indian actor and director, heart attack.
- Evaristo Márquez, 73, Colombian actor.
- Dennis O'Rourke, 67, Australian documentary film maker, cancer.
- Wangnia Pongte, 60, Indian footballer and politician, Arunachal Pradesh MLA for Changlang North (1990–2009), traffic collision.
- Maurice Priestley, 80, British mathematician.
- Harry Rozmiarek, 74, American veterinarian.
- Paul Soros, 87, Hungarian-born American mechanical engineer and philanthropist.
- Kenneth G. Wilson, 77, American physicist, Nobel Prize laureate (1982), lymphoma.
- Syd Young, 95, Australian footballer (South Melbourne).

=== 16 ===
- Sam Farber, 88, American industrial designer, co-founder of OXO, complications from a fall.
- Peggy Fenton, 85, American baseball player.
- T. Ed Garrison Jr., 91, American politician, member of the South Carolina House of Representatives (1956–1967) and Senate (1967–1986), natural causes.
- Frank Greenaway, 95, British museum curator.
- Roy Grow, 71, American political scientist.
- Hans Hass, 94, Austrian diving pioneer.
- Khondakar Ashraf Hossain, 63, Bangladesh poet and academic, heart attack.
- Isaiah Jesudason, 88, Malayali bishop.
- Josip Kuže, 60, Croatian football player and manager (Dinamo Zagreb), leukaemia.
- Richard Marlow, 74, English organist and choral director, Non-hodgkin lymphoma.
- James Massey, 79, American information theorist, cancer.
- T. K. M. Bava Musliyar, 82, Indian Muslim scholar and educationalist.
- Maurice Nadeau, 102, French writer and editor.
- Dwight Pattison, 51, Indian musician, heart attack.
- Daya Perera, Sri Lankan diplomat and lawyer, Ambassador to the United Nations (1988–1991).
- B. Raman, 77, Indian intelligence officer, co-founder of the Research and Analysis Wing, cancer.
- Bernard Sahlins, 90, American comedy writer and theater owner, founder of The Second City.
- D. M. Schurman, 88, Canadian historian.
- Yousef Madani Tabrizi, 85, Iranian Grand Ayatollah.
- Colette Urban, 61, Canadian/American artist, cancer.
- Ottmar Walter, 89, German footballer (1. FC Kaiserslautern), member of 1954 World Cup-winning team.

=== 17 ===
- Michael Baigent, 65, New Zealand author (The Holy Blood and the Holy Grail), brain haemorrhage.
- Carmen Carrozza, 91, Italian-born American accordionist.
- Atiqul Haque Chowdhury, 82, Bangladeshi playwright and TV producer.
- Pierre F. Côté, 85, Canadian civil servant, Chief Electoral Officer of Quebec (1978–1997).
- Bulbs Ehlers, 90, American basketball and baseball player.
- Jim Goddard, 77, English film and television director (Fox).
- Michael Goldie, 81, British actor (Coronation Street, Doctor Who, Robin Hood: Prince of Thieves).
- Irwin Held, 87, American restaurateur (Barney's Beanery), natural causes.
- James Holshouser, 78, American politician, Governor of North Carolina (1973–1977).
- Fuller Kimbrell, 103, American politician, member of the Alabama Senate (1946–1955).
- Werner Lang, 91, German automotive engineer.
- Albert Legogie, 76, Nigerian politician, member of the Senate for Edo North, malaria.
- Ma Xianda, 81, Chinese martial artist.
- Peter Millar, 62, Scottish footballer (Motherwell), brain tumour.
- Jalil Shahnaz, 92, Iranian maestro and Tar master, natural causes.
- Ray Stone, 89, American politician and educator, Mayor of Coeur d'Alene, Idaho (1986–1994).
- Geoff Strong, 75, English footballer (Arsenal, Liverpool).
- Tom Turner, 97, American Negro league baseball player.
- Rafael Valek, 80, Colombian footballer.

=== 18 ===
- Brent F. Anderson, 80, American politician, Mayor of West Valley City, Utah (1987–1994).
- Raghunath Bhattacharyya, 61, Indian judge, member of the Kolkata High Court (since 2010), COPD.
- Hugh Burry, 82, New Zealand rugby union player (Canterbury).
- Alastair Donaldson, 58, Scottish musician.
- Vernon Fougère, 70, Canadian Roman Catholic prelate, Bishop of Charlottetown (1991–2009).
- Gene Freese, 79, American baseball player, complications of back surgery.
- Garde Gardom, 88, Canadian politician, British Columbia MLA for Vancouver-Point Grey (1966–1986), Lieutenant-Governor of British Columbia (1995–2001).
- Brian P. Goodman, 66, Canadian civil servant, Chair of the Immigration and Refugee Board of Canada, heart arrhythmia.
- Michael Hastings, 33, American journalist (Rolling Stone, Newsweek, BuzzFeed), traffic collision.
- Norman MacKenzie, 91, English journalist, educationalist and historian.
- Jean Melzer, 87, Australian politician, Senator for Victoria (1974–1981).
- Imran Khan Mohmand, Pakistani politician, Khyber Pakhtunkhwa MLA for Mardan, bombing.
- Dave Petitjean, 85, American Cajun humorist and actor, complications from Alzheimer's disease.
- Alfred Planyavsky, 89, Austrian double-bassist and music historian.
- Michael Potter, 89, American cancer researcher, recipient of the Albert Lasker Award for Basic Medical Research (1984), acute myeloid leukemia.
- Claudio Rocchi, 62, Italian progressive rock singer-songwriter and musician, degenerative disease.
- Hassan Saadian, 88–89, Iranian Olympic wrestler.
- Ramón Sáez Marzo, 73, Spanish Olympic racing cyclist.
- Kukoi Sanyang, 61, Ivorian Gambian revolutionary.
- Sir Colin Stansfield Smith, 80, English architect and cricketer.
- Vijay Telang, 61, Indian cricketer (Vidarbha).
- David Wall, 67, British ballet dancer, cancer.

=== 19 ===
- Edward Chindori-Chininga, 58, Zimbabwean politician, MP for Guruve South, Minister of Mines and Mining Development (2000–2004), traffic collision.
- Vince Flynn, 47, American author (Mitch Rapp), prostate cancer.
- James Gandolfini, 51, American actor (The Sopranos, In the Loop, Crimson Tide), Emmy winner (2000, 2001, 2003), heart attack.
- Parke Godwin, 84, American author, natural causes.
- Michael Hodgman, 74, Australian federal and Tasmanian politician, MLC (1966–1974), MP (1975–1987), MHA (1992–1998, 2001–2010), emphysema.
- Gyula Horn, 80, Hungarian politician, Prime Minister (1994–1998).
- John Hughes, 78, Welsh ceramicist, creator of Grogg.
- Dave Jennings, 61, American football player (New York Jets, New York Giants), complications from Parkinson's disease.
- Danny Kravitz, 82, American baseball player (Pittsburgh Pirates), cancer.
- Sait Maden, 82, Turkish translator, poet, painter and graphic designer, pneumonia after bypass surgery.
- Alexandru Mușina, 58, Romanian poet.
- Paul Mees, 52, Australian academic and lawyer, cancer.
- Miguel Morayta, 105, Spanish-born Mexican film director.
- Ólafur Rafnsson, 50, Icelandic sports executive, president of FIBA Europe and National Olympic and Sports Association of Iceland.
- Alfons Schilling, 79, Swiss painter, Parkinson's disease.
- Kim Thompson, 56, American comic book editor and publisher (Fantagraphics Books), lung cancer.
- Filip Topol, 48, Czech musician.
- Slim Whitman, 90, American country singer-songwriter ("Indian Love Call", "Rose Marie"), heart failure.

=== 20 ===
- Fernando Aguilar, 75, Spanish Olympic athlete.
- Diosa Costello, 100, American Puerto Rican actress and singer.
- Franz Xaver Eder, 87, German Roman Catholic prelate, Bishop of Passau (1984–2001).
- Ibrahim Haji Jama Mee'aad, Somali militant (Al-Shabaab), shot.
- Vern Pyles, 94, American politician, member of the Pennsylvania House of Representatives (1974–1980), heart disease and cancer.
- Dicky Rutnagur, 82, Indian cricket journalist and author.
- Ingvar Rydell, 91, Swedish Olympic footballer (1952).
- Jean-Louis Scherrer, 78, French fashion designer.
- Günter Seibold, 76, German footballer.
- Philip Slater, 86, American sociologist and academic, non-Hodgkin's lymphoma.
- Manuel Bernardo de Sousa, 81, Angolan diplomat.
- Jeffrey Smart, 91, Australian painter, renal failure.
- John David Wilson, 93, English animator and producer (Grease, Lady and the Tramp, Peter Pan), dementia.
- Wu Zhengyi, 97, Chinese botanist, winner of the State Science and Technology Prize (2007).
- Pu Zoduha, 73, Indian politician, Mizoram nominated MLA (1984–1987), complications from hypertension and diabetes.

=== 21 ===
- Huáscar Aparicio, 41, Bolivian folk singer, car accident.
- Charles L. Campbell, 82, American sound editor (Back to the Future, E.T. the Extra-Terrestrial, The Rocketeer), Oscar winner (1983, 1986, 1989).
- Mohan Lal Chakma, 101, Indian politician, Tripura MLA for Penchartal (1978–1983).
- Diane Clare, 74, British actress (The Haunting).
- N. Dennis, 85, Indian politician, MP for Nagercoil (1980–2003).
- Jerry Dexter, 78, American actor (Gomer Pyle, U.S.M.C., Josie and the Pussycats, Downhill Racer).
- Abdol-Aziz Mirza Farmanfarmaian, 93, Iranian architect.
- Genaro García, 34, Mexican boxer, shot.
- Margret Göbl, 74, German Olympic figure skater (1960).
- Dame Barbara Goodman, 80, New Zealand politician.
- James P. Gordon, 85, American physicist.
- Marcelo Grassmann, 88, Brazilian engraver and draughtsman.
- Bernard Hunt, 83, English professional golfer.
- Ed Iacobucci, 59, Argentinian-born American technology executive, co-founder of Citrix Systems, pancreatic cancer.
- Mina Izadyar, 63, Iranian professor and pediatrician, cancer.
- Jacqueline Livingston, 69, American photographer.
- Mary Love, 69, American soul and gospel singer.
- Edgar Mann, 86, British Manx politician, Chairman of the Executive Council (1981–1985), complications of cancer.
- Uzi Meshulam, 60, Israeli rabbi.
- Milorad Mišković, 86, Serbian ballet dancer, Chevalier of the Légion d'honneur.
- Alen Pamić, 23, Croatian footballer (NK Istra 1961), hypercholesterolemia and coronary artery plaque.
- Sajid Qureshi, 53, Pakistani politician, Sindh MLA for Karachi, shot.
- Elliott Reid, 93, American actor (Gentlemen Prefer Blondes), heart failure.
- Wendy Saddington, 64, Australian jazz and blues singer (Chain), oesophageal cancer.
- Alfred O. Schumann, 89, American farmer and politician.
- Curtis W. Tarr, 88, American civil servant and academic, head of the Selective Service System during Vietnam, pneumonia.
- Per Ung, 80, Norwegian sculptor, cancer.
- Zhang Guangdou, 101, Chinese hydraulic engineer and educator.

=== 22 ===
- Cameron Baird, 32, Australian soldier, Victoria Cross recipient, shot.
- Robert O. Cox, 95, American politician, Mayor of Fort Lauderdale (1986–1991).
- Leandro Díaz, 85, Colombian music composer (Vallenato), acute kidney infection.
- Martha Mayer Erlebacher, 75, American artist.
- Beverly Fawell, 82, American politician, member of the Illinois House of Representatives (1981–1983) and Illinois Senate (1983–1999), chronic heart failure.
- Sergio Focardi, 80, Italian physicist.
- Peter Fraser, Baron Fraser of Carmyllie, 68, Scottish politician and advocate, MP (1979–1987), Lord Advocate (1989–1992), Solicitor General (1982–1989).
- Gary David Goldberg, 68, American screenwriter and director (Family Ties, Must Love Dogs, Dad), Emmy winner (1979, 1987), brain cancer.
- Alexander Grunauer, 91, Russian scientist.
- Donald Hustad, 94, American evangelical church musician, academic and author.
- Jan Jaskólski, 73, Polish Olympic athlete.
- Henning Larsen, 87, Danish architect, natural causes.
- Loránd Lohinszky, 88, Hungarian actor and academic.
- Deric Longden, 77, British author and screenwriter, cancer.
- Allan Simonsen, 34, Danish racing driver, complications from a race collision during 2013 24 Hours of Le Mans.
- Javier Tomeo, 80, Spanish writer, infection and diabetes.
- Jesús Humberto Velázquez Garay, 73, Mexican Roman Catholic prelate, Bishop of Celaya (1988–2003), respiratory disease.
- Soccor Velho, 29, Indian footballer, cardiac arrest.

=== 23 ===
- Pat Ashton, 82, English actress (The Benny Hill Show).
- Bobby Bland, 83, American blues and soul singer ("Further Up the Road", "Turn On Your Love Light").
- Frank Kelso, 79, American naval officer, Chief of Naval Operations (1990–1994), complications from a fall.
- Kurt Leichtweiss, 86, German mathematician.
- Little Willie Littlefield, 81, American pianist and singer, cancer.
- Richard Matheson, 87, American author (I Am Legend, The Shrinking Man) and television writer (The Twilight Zone).
- Ron May, 57, American technology columnist, diabetes.
- Darryl Read, 61, British musician, poet and actor, motorcycle accident.
- Sharon Stouder, 64, American triple gold medal-winning Olympic swimmer (1964).
- Frank Stranahan, 90, American golfer, winner of The Amateur Championship (1948, 1950).
- Meamea Thomas, 25, I-Kiribati Olympic weightlifter (2004), traffic collision.

=== 24 ===
- Mick Aston, 66, British archaeologist (Time Team).
- Bill Atkinson, 68, English footballer (Torquay United).
- Cleve Backster, 89, American polygraph expert.
- Anibal Barrow, 58, Honduran journalist and news anchor, shot.
- John P. Clay, 78, American translator (Clay Sanskrit Library).
- Emilio Colombo, 93, Italian politician, Prime Minister (1970–1972).
- Papa Malick Diop, 68, Senegalese Olympic basketball player.
- Jackie Fargo, 82, American professional wrestler, congenital heart disease.
- Mauro Francaviglia, 60, Italian mathematician.
- Dame Phyllis Friend, 90, British nursing officer.
- Joannes Gijsen, 80, Dutch-Icelandic Roman Catholic prelate, Bishop of Roermond (1972–1993) and Reykjavík (1996–2007), cancer.
- William Hathaway, 89, American politician, member of the US House (1965–1973) and US Senate for Maine (1973–1979).
- Lucky Isibor, 36, Nigerian footballer.
- Puff Johnson, 40, American pop singer and songwriter, cervical cancer.
- James Martin, 79, British author, computer scientist and businessman, swimming accident.
- Alan Myers, 58, American New Wave drummer (Devo), brain cancer.
- John L. Nickels, 82, American judge, member of the Illinois Supreme Court (1992–1998).
- Lutfar Rahman Sarkar, 80, Bangladeshi banker, Governor of Bangladesh Bank.
- Michael Schwarzwalder, 69, American politician.
- Andy Scott, 58, Canadian politician, MP for Fredericton (1993–2009), Solicitor General (1997–1998), cancer.
- Vasile Tiță, 85, Romanian Olympic boxer (1952).

=== 25 ===
- Gianfranco Baldazzi, 69, Italian lyricist, record producer, author and journalist.
- Giuseppe Berton, 80, Italian missionary.
- George Burditt, 89, American television writer and producer (Three's Company, Silver Spoons, 227).
- Jack Cantoni, 65, French rugby union player.
- Sarah Charlesworth, 66, American conceptual artist and photographer, brain aneurysm.
- Mark Fisher, 66, British stage designer and ceremony producer (2008, 2012).
- Catherine Gibson, 82, Scottish Olympic swimmer (1948).
- Robert E. Gilka, 96, American photographer and news executive, director of photography for National Geographic, complications of pneumonia.
- Jim Hudson, 70, American football player (New York Jets), traumatic dementia encephalopathy.
- Lau Kar-leung, 76, Chinese Hong Kong martial artist, action choreographer and film director (The 36th Chamber of Shaolin), cancer.
- Eddie Liu, 91, Australian community leader.
- James Lydon, 85, Irish educator and historian.
- Harry Parker, 77, American Olympic rower (1960) and Olympic rowing coach (USRowing, Harvard University).
- Taghi Rouhani, 93, Iranian news anchor.
- Uma Shivakumar, 71, Indian actress.
- Mildred Ladner Thompson, 95, American journalist (Wall Street Journal, Associated Press).
- Green Wix Unthank, 90, American senior judge, member of the US District Court for Eastern Kentucky (1980–2012).
- Warren Widener, 75, American lawyer.

=== 26 ===
- James Allan, 84, Canadian Anglican prelate, Bishop of Keewatin (1974–1991).
- Hervé Boussard, 47, French Olympic cyclist (1992), epileptic seizure.
- Antonio Jasso, 78, Mexican footballer (national team, Club América).
- Edward Huggins Johnstone, 91, Brazilian-born American senior (former chief) judge, member of the US District Court for Western Kentucky (since 1977).
- Sandy Knott, 75, American Olympic athlete.
- Adam Koppy, 40, American mechanical engineer, traffic collision.
- K. Narayana Kurup, 86, Indian politician, Kerala MLA for Vazhoor (1963–1967, 1970–1980, 1984–2005).
- Byron Looper, 48, American politician and criminal, cardiac ailment.
- Miguel Mansilla, 60, Uruguayan professional footballer, cardiac arrest.
- Dumitru Matcovschi, 73, Romanian-born Moldovan poet, complications from brain surgery.
- Mal McBean, 91, Australian rules footballer.
- Kimberly McCarthy, 52, American criminal, execution by lethal injection.
- Justin Miller, 35, American baseball player (Toronto Blue Jays, San Francisco Giants).
- Nilton Pacheco, 92, Brazilian Olympic basketball player (1948).
- Abdul Rahman Mokhtar, 55, Malaysian politician, Terengganu State Representative for Kuala Besut, lung cancer.
- Marc Rich, 78, Belgian-born American tax evader, commodities trader and illegal oil broker (Iran Hostage Crisis), stroke.
- Bert Stern, 83, American celebrity photographer (The Last Sitting) and documentary maker (Jazz on a Summer's Day).
- Rawleigh Warner Jr., 92, American oil executive, CEO and Chairman of Mobil (1969–1986), inclusion body myositis.
- Subhash Yadav, 67, Indian politician, Madhya Pradesh MLA for Kasrawad (since 1993).

=== 27 ===
- Shafiq Badr, 87, Lebanese politician, MP for Chouf (1972–1992).
- Stefano Borgonovo, 49, Italian footballer, amyotrophic lateral sclerosis.
- Henrik Otto Donner, 73, Finnish composer and music industry executive.
- Muhammad Emin Er, c. 99, Turkish Islamic scholar.
- Josef Geryk, 70, Czech footballer (FC Spartak Trnava).
- Dudley Knight, 73, American drama teacher.
- Liu Wenjin, 76, Chinese composer of classical Chinese music.
- Alain Mimoun, 92, French Olympic runner (1948, 1952, 1956, 1960) and marathon champion (1956).
- James Njiru, Kenyan politician, cancer.
- Ian Scott, 68, New Zealand painter.
- A. C. Shanmughadas, 74, Indian politician, Kerala MLA for Balussery (1970–2003), cardiac arrest.

=== 28 ===
- João Alves, 87, Portuguese Roman Catholic prelate, Bishop of Coimbra (1976–2001).
- Yiye Ávila, 87, American Puerto Rican televangelist, heart attack.
- Thérèse Blondeau, 99, French Olympic swimmer (1936).
- Ari Brynjolfsson, 86, Icelandic–born American physicist.
- Bhavna Chikhalia, 58, Indian politician, MP for Junagadh (1991–2004), cardiac arrest.
- George Hall Dixon, 92, American banker, Deputy Secretary of the Treasury.
- Fred Gibson, 101, Jamaican-born English cricketer.
- Ted Hood, 86, American yacht skipper (Courageous), judge and official (US Sailing), inducted into America's Cup Hall of Fame (1993), heart failure and pneumonia.
- Tamás Katona, 81, Hungarian politician and historian.
- Peter Lehmann, 82, Australian vineyard owner and vintner, kidney disease.
- Kenneth Minogue, 83, Australian academic and political scientist.
- Bob Oliver, 66, American football player (Cleveland Browns), cancer.
- Matt Osborne, 55, American professional wrestler (Doink the Clown), accidental overdose of hydrocodone and morphine.
- Jacques Planchard, 84, Belgian politician, Governor of Luxembourg (1976–1996).
- F. D. Reeve, 84, American academic and author.
- David Rubitsky, 96, American World War II veteran, disputed claimant for Medal of Honor.
- Charlie L. Russell, 81, American playwright (Five on the Black Hand Side), brother of Bill Russell, gastric cancer.
- John Stollery, 83, British engineer and academic.
- Silvi Vrait, 62, Estonian singer ("Nagu merelaine") and actress, brain tumor.

=== 29 ===
- Khalnazar Agakhanov, 61, Turkmen diplomat and politician, Ambassador to Russia, Germany and Kazakhstan.
- Marge Anderson, 81, American Chippewa tribal executive, Chief of the Mille Lacs (1991–2000, 2008–2012), natural causes.
- Serge Blanc, 83, French classical violinist.
- Harisinh Pratapsinh Chavda, 83, Indian politician, MP for Banaskantha (2004–2008), Gujarat MLA for Danta (1975–1985).
- Abdul Mutalib Mohamed Daud, 52, Malaysian journalist, stroke.
- Peter Fitzgerald, 76, Irish footballer.
- Jack Gotta, 83, American CFL and WFL football player, coach and general manager (Calgary Stampeders, Saskatchewan Roughriders, Birmingham Americans).
- Sarah Guyard-Guillot, 31, French acrobat (Cirque du Soleil), fall.
- Lou Guzzo, 94, American journalist (Seattle Times), editor (Seattle Post-Intelligencer) and commentator (KIRO-TV).
- Margherita Hack, 91, Italian astrophysicist and popular science writer, suspected heart failure.
- Gilma Jiménez, 57, Colombian politician, member of Senate for Bogotá, cervical cancer.
- Jim Kelly, 67, American martial artist and actor (Enter the Dragon), cancer.
- Leopoldo López Escobar, 72–73, Chilean geochemistry academic.
- David Moore, 79, British botanist specialising in South American flora and fauna.
- Ryūtarō Nakamura, 58, Japanese animation director and storyboard artist (Serial Experiments Lain, Kino's Journey, Sakura Wars), pancreatic cancer.
- Paul Smith, 91, American jazz pianist, heart failure.
- Jørgen Sønstebø, 91, Norwegian politician.
- Larry Townsend, 66, American politician, member of the Vermont House of Representatives (since 2008), cancer.
- Kishor Vankawala, 70, Indian politician, Gujarat MLA for Surat West (since 2007), lung cancer.

=== 30 ===
- Alan Campbell, Baron Campbell of Alloway, 96, British life peer, barrister and Colditz prisoner.
- Akpor Pius Ewherido, 50, Nigerian politician, member of the Senate for Delta Central (since 2011), Delta MLA for Ughelli South (1999–2007), complications from a stroke.
- Claudio Fattoretto, 57, Italian voice actor, stroke.
- Richard Fehr, 73, Swiss religious leader, Chief Apostle of the New Apostolic Church (1988–2005).
- Juggie Heen, 82, American politician, member of the Hawaii House of Representatives (1963–1967, 1969–1971), pancreatic and liver cancer.
- William Houle, 81, American Chippewa tribal executive, Chairman of the Fond du Lac (1974–1988), instrumental to Indian gaming in the United States.
- Kathryn Morrison, 71, American politician, member of the Wisconsin Senate (1975–1979), breast cancer.
- Thompson Oliha, 44, Nigerian footballer (Nigeria Super Eagles), complications from malaria.
- Iván Ruttkay, 87, Hungarian Olympic speed skater (1948).
- Sir Keith Seaman, 93, Australian viceroy, Governor of South Australia (1977–1982).
- Brian Sparks, 82, Welsh police officer and teacher.
- Joyce Waley-Cohen, 93, English educationalist and public servant.
