= Schumann (surname) =

Schumann is a German occupational surname. Notable people with the name include:

== In athletics ==
- Desirée Schumann (born 1990), German goalkeeper
- Manfred Schumann (born 1951), German bobsledder
- Margit Schumann (1952–2017), German luger
- Nils Schumann (born 1978), German athlete
- Ralf Schumann (born 1962), German champion 25 m Rapid Fire Pistol shooter

== In music ==
- Clara Schumann (née Wieck, 1819–1896), German pianist and composer; wife of Robert Schumann
- Coco Schumann (1924–2018), German jazz musician
- Elisabeth Schumann (1888–1952), German opera soprano
- Ernestine Schumann-Heink (1861–1936), opera singer
- Eugenie Schumann (1851-1938), German pianist and author, daughter of Robert and Clara Schumann
- Georg Schumann (composer) (1866–1952), German composer and director
- John Schumann (born 1953), Australian singer, songwriter, guitarist, formerly in Redgum
- Peter Schumann (born 1934), theater director
- Robert Schumann (1810–1856), German composer
- Walter Schumann (1913–1958), American soundtrack composer

== In politics ==
- Alfred O. Schumann (1924–2013), American politician
- Conrad Schumann (1942–1998), East German soldier who defected to the West
- Georg Schumann (resistance fighter) (1886–1945), German Communist and resistance fighter against the Nazis
- Dr. Horst Schumann (1906–1983), German Nazi SS-Sturmbannführer, participated in criminal medical experiments at Auschwitz
- Marvin C. Schumann (1906-1994), American politician
- Maurice Schumann (1911–1998), French politician

== In other fields ==
- Erich Schumann (1898–1985), German physicist
- Erik Schumann (1925-2007), German actor
- Karl Moritz Schumann (1851–1904), German botanist
- Kjell Alrich Schumann (1966–2025), Norwegian convicted robber and murderer
- Winfried Otto Schumann (1888–1974), German physicist who predicted the Schumann resonance
