= Ron May =

Ron May may refer to:

- Ron May (politician) (born 1934), American politician in Colorado
- Ron May (columnist) (1956–2013), American journalist
