= Farid Khan =

Farid Khan may refer to:

- Farid Khan (field hockey) (1936–2021), Hong Kong Olympic field hockey player
- Farid Khan (politician) (died 2013), Pakistani politician
- Muhammad Farid Khan (1904–1969), last ruling Nawab of the princely state of Amb
- Sher Shah Suri (1486–1545; r. 1540–1545), birth name Farid Khan, founder and emperor of the Sur Empire in northern India
