= Margaret Jackson =

Margaret Jackson may refer to:

- Margaret Jackson (executive) (born 1953), Australian corporate executive
- Margaret Jackson (climber) (1843–1906), mountaineer
- Margaret Jackson (secretary) (1917–2013), principal secretary to the director general of the SOE, member of the OEEC, and Southwark councillor
- Margaret J. Jackson (died 2003), American politician from Maryland

== See also ==
- Margaret Beckett, born Margaret Jackson
