= López Escobar =

López Escobar may refer to:

- Julián López Escobar (born 1982), Spanish bullfighter
- Leopoldo López Escobar (1940–2013), Chilean geochemist
