= Jack McGrath =

Jack McGrath may refer to:

- Jack McGrath (footballer) (1924–2013), Australian rules footballer for Geelong
- Jack McGrath (rugby union) (born 1989), Irish rugby union player
- Jack McGrath (racing driver) (1919–1955), American racecar driver
- Jack McGrath (American football), American football player and coach
