= Njiru =

Njiru is the surname of the following people and places:

== People ==
- Patrick Njiru (born 1957), a former Kenyan rally driver
- Wawira Njiru, a Kenyan entrepreneur, nutritionist, and philanthropist
- Jane Wanjuki Njiru, a Kenyan politician
- Silas Silvius Njiru (1928–2020), a Kenyan Roman Catholic bishop
- Paul Kariuki Njiru (born 1963), a Kenyan Roman Catholic bishop
- James Njiru (died 2013), a Kenyan politician
- Kennedy Njiru (1987–2020), Kenyan steeplechase runner

== Places ==
- Njiru, Nairobi, a neighbourhood in Nairobi
