= Grunauer =

Grunauer is a surname. Notable people with the surname include:

- Alexander Grunauer (1921–2013), Russian Soviet scientist
- Peter Grunauer, Austrian chef

== See also ==
- Grünauer BC, a German football club
