= Karran =

Karran may refer to:

- Kampta Karran (died 2013), Guyanese sociologist and author
- Peter Karran (born 1960), Manx politician

== See also ==
- Karan, Iran (disambiguation)
