= 1992 Nigerian Senate elections in Edo State =

1992 Nigerian Senate election in Edo State

The 1992 Nigerian Senate election in Edo State was held on July 4, 1992, to elect members of the Nigerian Senate to represent Edo State. John Oriaifo representing Edo South-East, Sunday Osarumwense Iyahen representing Edo South-West and Albert Legogie representing Edo North all won on the platform of the Social Democratic Party.

== Overview ==
Affiliation	Party		Total
Affiliation	SDP	NRC	Total
Before Election			3
After Election	3	0	3

== Summary ==
District	Incumbent	Party	Elected Senator	Party
Edo South-East			John Oriaifo	SDP
Edo South-West			Sunday Osarumwense Iyahen	SDP
Edo North			Albert Legogie	SDP

== Results ==
=== Edo South-East ===
The election was won by John Oriaifo of the Social Democratic Party.

1992 Nigerian Senate election in Edo State
Party	Candidate	Votes	%
SDP	John Oriaifo		
Total votes			
SDP hold			

=== Edo South-West ===
The election was won by Sunday Osarumwense Iyahen of the Social Democratic Party.

1992 Nigerian Senate election in Edo State
Party	Candidate	Votes	%
SDP	Sunday Osarumwense Iyahen		
Total votes			
SDP hold			

=== Edo North ===
The election was won by Albert Legogie of the Social Democratic Party.

1992 Nigerian Senate election in Edo State
Party	Candidate	Votes	%
SDP	Albert Legogie		
Total votes			
SDP hold			
