= Stanley Johnson =

Stanley Johnson may refer to:

- Stanley Johnson (basketball) (born 1996), American basketball player
- Stanley Johnson (politician) (1869–1937), UK solicitor, MP 1918–1924
- Stanley Johnson (writer) (born 1940), British-French politician and writer
- Stanley A. Johnson (1925–2013), US politician, farmer, and minister
- Stanley E. Johnson, American film editor
- Stan Johnson (baseball) (1937–2012), baseball outfielder
- Stan Johnson (American football) (born 1955), American football player
- Stan Johnson (basketball coach)
- Stan Johnson, a character on General Hospital
- Stanley Johnson (hammer thrower) (born 1918), hammer throw winner at the 1941 USA Outdoor Track and Field Championships
- Stanley Johnson (triple jumper) (born 1914), American triple jumper, runner-up at the 1935 USA Outdoor Track and Field Championships

== See also ==
- Stanley Johnston (1900–1962), Australian-American journalist
