= Alfred Montero =

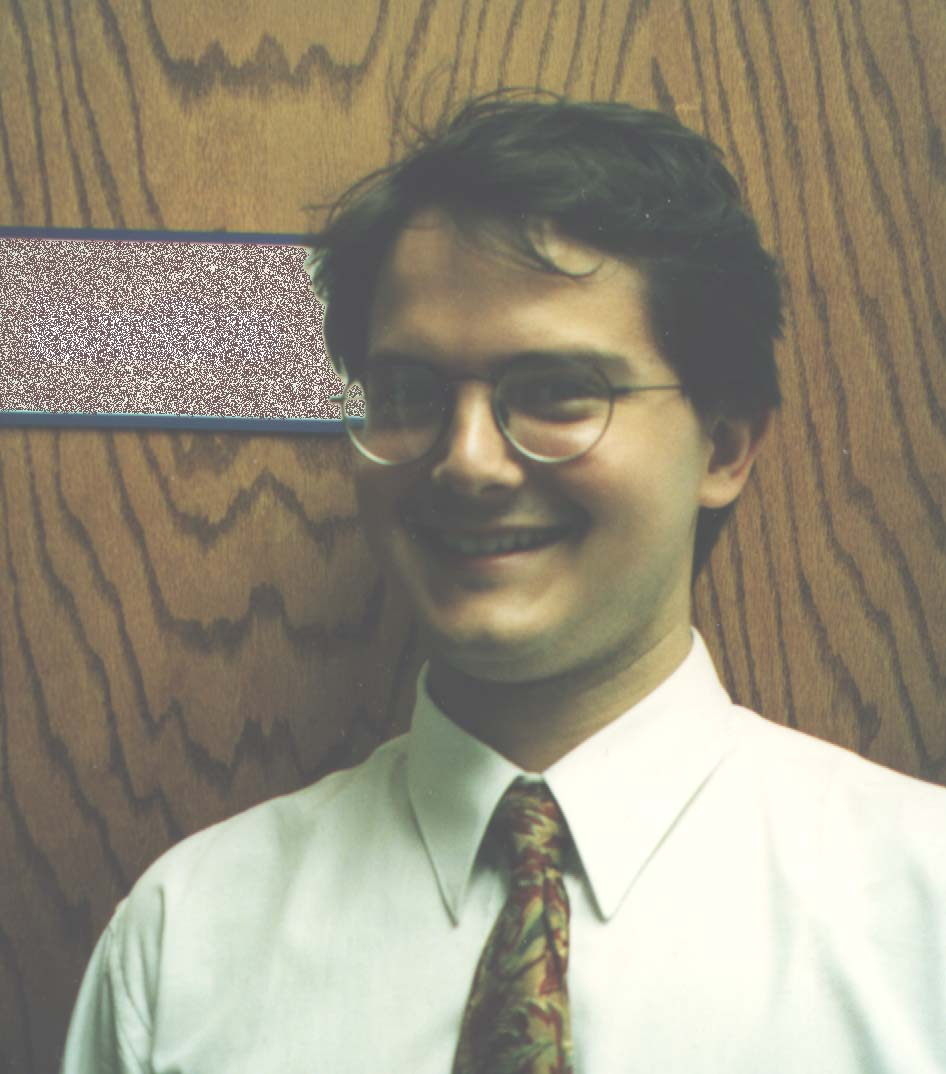
Al Montero

Alfred P. Montero (born March 24, 1969) is Frank B. Kellogg Professor of political science at Carleton College, specializing in comparative politics. He has also done in-depth studies of Brazil and Spain, and is the faculty director of an off-campus studies program at Carleton that focuses on the European Union as well as European Political Economy at the subnational level. Montero is the adviser of the Posse Foundation scholars program at Carleton. He has previously taught a comparative off-campus studies seminal with Roy Grow, a Carleton professor specializing in the political economy of East Asia.

Montero was a double major in political science and Latin American studies University of Miami, where he graduated magna cum laude in 1990. He received a PhD in political science with Distinction from Columbia University in 1997. He is married to renowned Spanish linguist Mar Valdecantos, whom he met at a bullfight in Seville, Spain, while conducting research for his first book.

== Books by Alfred Montero ==
- Shifting States in Global Markets: Subnational Industrial Policy in Contemporary Brazil and Spain (Penn State University Press, 2002).
- Decentralization and Democracy in Latin America, co-edited w/ David Samuels (University of Notre Dame Press, 2004).
- Brazilian Politics: Reforming a Democratic State in a Changing World (Polity Press, 2005).
- Brazil: Reversal of Fortune (Polity Press, 2014)
