= Jaakko Wallenius =

Finnish writer and journalist (1958–2013)

Jaakko J. Wallenius (January 30, 1958 – June 11, 2013) was a Finnish writer and journalist.

== Biography ==
Jaakko Wallenius was born in Hämeenlinna in 1958.

He taught himself to read in Finnish at the age of 6, and later learned German, Swedish, and English.

In 1990, he married Marjaliisa Wallenius, and they remained together until his death.

He was diagnosed with inoperable cancer in November 2011. In his last entry to his blog Being Human on April 14, 2013, he wrote:

I am still here thanks to chemotherapy that has given me an additional year and a half, but the therapies were terminated a week ago because their ability to fight my cancer has waned off. I am on my own now, but nobody knows how soon the end will come. However, it is quite certain that I will not see my 56th birthday in January of 2014.

He died on June 11, 2013.

== Work ==
Jaakko Wallenius worked mainly in journalism and blogging, as well as computer repair. He had eight blogs in two languages and nearly 40 Facebook fan pages for secular philosophers, writers, and scientists.

The Finnish publishing company Edita published in the year 2002 Jaakko Wallenius's book on OpenOffice.org– productivity suite called ”OpenOffice tehokäyttöön” of which the second edition was published with the name ”OpenOffice – koulutuspaketti” in the year 2004. In the year 2005 Jaakko Wallenius published a website called ”Rakasta tietokonettasi –kansalaisen tietotekniikkatieto” or ”Love your computer”with the financial aid of Journalistisen kulttuurin edistämissäätiö Jokes-foundation. This work has been published as a web-site Jaakko Wallenius was awarded in year 2008 a grant by The Finnish Association Of Non-Fiction Writers society to write ”Jäähyväiset jumalille – tieteen haaste uskonnoille”. These essays have been translated to English and they have been published in the Being Human blog.

Jaakko Wallenius was the economics editor in the newspaper Länsi-Uusimaa, which is published in Lohja, from 1990. In the year 2001 Jaakko Wallenius started a private enterprise called Bittitohtori, which concentrated on the maintenance of home computers and web-design.

== Political and philosophical views ==
Jaakko Wallenius considered himself an Epicurean Stoic Humanist as well as an atheist.
