= Adam Koppy =

American mechanical engineer

Adam Koppy in front of a FSW machine at NASA Michoud Assembly Facility near New Orleans

Adam H. Koppy (April 13, 1973 – June 26, 2013) was an American mechanical engineer. He was internationally recognised as one of the leading friction stir welding machine designers and builders. He was one of three inventors of a patented adapter for use in friction stir welding that is suitable for use on a milling machine, including a mechanism for adjustment of the weld tool along its longitudinal axis.

== University ==
Adam Koppy studied Mechanical Engineering and Machine Design at Kettering University from 1992 to 1997 where he obtained his Bachelor of Science in Mechanical Engineering (BSME). From 1998 to 2002 he studied Mechanical Engineering at Western Michigan University, where he focussed on vibration and stress, and where he obtained his Master of Science in Mechanical Engineering (MSME).

== Hess Engineering Inc. ==
From June 1992 to November 2001 he worked for 9½ years as an engineer at Hess Engineering, Inc. on both conceptual and detail design of DC upset welding machines for passenger car wheels. This involved benchmarking the competition, developing concepts, holding design review meetings, detailed layout, mechanical and structural analysis with finite element analysis. He also worked on structural and drivetrain engineering and analysis for the project engineering group, verifying the functionality of designs using Cosmos, NASTRAN, proprietary software and prototype testing. He did the conceptual and detail design for an ultrasonic leak testing machine for passenger car wheels. As part of this design process, he assessed several leak detecting systems, selected major components, and developed concepts and detail mechanical layout. This machine could detect a 50 micron hole at a rate of 900 parts/hour.

== Motan ==
From December 2001 to June 2002 he worked as an engineer at Motan. There he was the primary engineer for design and development of pneumatic conveying machinery for bulk plastic pellets. He reduced material cost of the vacuum receiver design by 15% while decreasing assembly effort and improving performance and reliability. This was the first project drawn using AutoCAD Inventor 3D modeling software. He also worked on system design and hardware specifications for an electrical data bus system to centralize drying and conveying.

== Transformation Technologies Inc. ==
From July 2002 to December 2008 he worked for more than 6½ years as Engineering Manager at Transformation Technologies Inc. in South Bend, Indiana. There he was the lead engineer for the design of friction stir welding machines for aerospace and research. This role required him to carry out the design from clean sheet to final drawings in SolidWorks and Inventor, including structural analysis using the finite element method and hand calculations, as well as spindle design, drivetrain sizing, and servo actuator selection. His reputation for simple, robust and cost-effective design was highly regarded. His particular specialty was high stiffness machines for friction stir welding of steel and high temperature alloys. He also made significant contributions to the design of workholding fixtures for aircraft and spacecraft. He was also responsible for hiring and overseeing full-time and contract engineering staff in addition to project management for multiple projects simultaneously, which included obtaining quotes and verifying vendors as well as scheduling engineering, manufacturing and shipping. At this company he designed, built and installed machines that welded two spaceships, two airplanes, and nuclear fuel rods. Especially for building space craft the value of the components to be welded is very high: "When you're building equipment for the space agency, the part you're welding is usually much more valuable than the machine welding it," said Koppy.

== Manufacturing Technology Inc. ==
Subsequently he worked from January 2009 to December 2012 for 4 years as Principal Engineer at Manufacturing Technology, Inc. (MTI) in South Bend, Indiana, after this company had merged with his previous employer Transformation Technologies Inc.. In this position he was responsible for the development of new equipment, primarily linear friction welding machines, but also friction stir welding machines and rotary friction welding machines. His responsibilities also included training and assessing engineers on failure modes, electrical component sizing, and finite element analysis both dynamic and structural. At MTI, he managed a staff of up to 6 engineers including subcontractors.

== Blue Penguin Corp. ==
In January 2013 Adam founded his own engineering services company, Blue Penguin Corp in SW Michigan, fulfilling one of his long term dreams.

== Death ==
He died on the afternoon of June 26, 2013 in a car crash, after a 15-year-old unlicensed driver did not stop at a stop sign at Pokagon Highway in Dowagiac, Cass County, Michigan. After striking the teen's car Koppy’s vehicle slid into oncoming traffic, and he was pronounced dead on arrival at Borgess Lee Memorial Hospital. He was survived by his wife Kate and two daughters.

== Patents ==
- Timothy J Haynie, Anthony D Hofferbert and Adam H Koppy: Adapter for friction stir welding, Patent Publication Number US20060032887 A1, United States Patent 7448526
