= George Hall Dixon =

- Born: October 7, 1920; Rochester, NY
- Died: 28 June 2013 (aged 92)
- Occupations: Chairman & CEO, US Bank

George Hall Dixon Jr. (October 7, 1920 – June 28, 2013) served as president of First National Bank of Minneapolis and First Bank System (now US Bank), and as Deputy Secretary of the Treasury under Gerald Ford.

== Early life ==
Dixon was born in Rochester, New York on October 7, 1920, the older of two children. Though his father died in debt during his teens, Dixon managed to keep the family together and graduated from John Marshall High School in 1938. As a young man, Dixon played tennis and earned the rank of Eagle Scout. As a Boy Scout, he travelled to the World Jamboree in the Netherlands in 1937. He enrolled in the Wharton School at the University of Pennsylvania, graduating with a degree in business in 1942.

== Military service ==
Following the declaration of war on Japan, Dixon enlisted in the United States Army as a private. He soon became a lieutenant and served first as a riflery instructor. He was later sent over to the European theater and served under General Omar Bradley in the quartermaster corps, head of a segregated unit of supply vehicles that played an integral part in the campaign against the Nazis, including at the Battle of the Bulge. He remained in Europe with the Army for a year after the war ended, and was eventually discharged as a captain.

== Career and family life ==
Upon returning home, Dixon attended and graduated from Harvard Business School and began what was to be a long and distinguished career in the private sector. He worked first for Brown Brothers Harriman in Boston, Massachusetts, then for Davis and Davis, a stock broker in Providence, Rhode Island, and then for Sperry and Hutchinson, the New York City creators of S&H Green Stamps.

While in Providence, Dixon met Marjorie "Peggy" Ellen Freeman (granddaughter of the prominent engineer John Ripley Freeman), whom he would later marry. They had three children; identical twin boys George Elliott Dixon and Andrew Taft Dixon, and a daughter, Candis Hall Dixon.

Meanwhile, Dixon was making a name for himself in the business world, and First National Bank of Minneapolis, taking notice, recruited him to serve as president in the mid-1960s. Dixon accepted and held the position until 1974, at which point Gerald Ford became the 38th President of the United States of America. Ford asked Dixon to serve as his Deputy Secretary of the Treasury, working with Treasury Secretary William E. Simon to manage financial policy, along with the Secret Service, ATF, and the Customs Service. While serving as the Deputy Secretary, Dixon often attended cabinet meetings that included such political figures as Secretary of Defense Donald Rumsfeld and Secretary of State Henry Kissinger.

When Ford's term ended, Dixon returned to Minneapolis to assume the role of chairman and president of First Bank System. While in Minnesota, Dixon became involved with Carleton College, a small liberal arts college in nearby Northfield, Minnesota. He served on the college's board of trustees, including a term as chairman in the 1990s. While chairman, Dixon recruited Stephen R. Lewis to take the post of president of the college. In 2000, Carleton awarded Dixon a PhD for Lifetime achievement.
