= Udham Singh (Chhattisgarh Maoist) =

Indian Maoist militant

Udham Singh (died June 8, 2013) was an Indian Maoist militant, member of the Naxalites, and general secretary of the secretary of the Mohla Manpur area committee.

On June 8, 2013, he was shot dead near Chhattisgarh, India.
