= Annabel Tollman =

Annabel Tollman (March 7, 1974 – June 5, 2013) was a Belgian/British American fashion journalist and editor of Interview magazine.

== Early life ==
Annabel Tollman was born in Brussels, Belgium, and grew up in London and Western New York. She studied at Central Saint Martins, located in London, UK. After graduating from Central Saint Martins, Tollman moved to New York, where she furthered her studies at the Parsons School of Design.

== Career ==
During her early career, Tollman was as an assistant to the British edition of Vogue magazine. After 12 years in this role, she became the magazine's fashion director. She was also the stylist and fashion director of a Bravo reality series. Her clients were Scarlett Johansson, Mariah Carey, Mary-Kate, and Ashley Olsen. In 2011, The Hollywood Reporter placed her at 21 on its list of the 25 Most Powerful Stylists in Hollywood. She was also the stylist and spokeswoman for eBay fashion.

In 2010, she was voted one of the 50 most stylish New Yorkers by StyleCaster.

== Death ==
Tollman died in her sleep in June 2013 at age 39. A pulmonary embolism reportedly caused her death as a result of a blood clot.
