= Raymond McCormick =

Australian cricketer

Personal information
- Born: 30 January 1931; Adelaide, Australia
- Died: 8 June 2013 (aged 82); Adelaide, Australia
- Source: ESPNcricinfo, 3 June 2016

Raymond McCormick (30 January 1931 – 8 June 2013) was an Australian cricketer. He played six first-class matches for South Australia in 1959/60.
