= Khalnazar Agakhanov =

Turkmen diplomat (1952–2013)

Khalnazar Agakhanov (Turkmen: Halnazar Agahanow, Russian: Халназар Агаханов) (25 February 1952 – 29 June 2013) was a Turkmen politician and diplomat. Born in Ashgabat, he served as the ambassador to Kazakhstan (1999–2000), Russia (2000–2012), Bulgaria (2009–2012), Germany and Latvia (2012 until his death). Agakhanov died from cancer in Berlin on 29 June 2013.
