= Roy Grow =

American political scientist (1941–2013)

Roy Grow (1941 – 2013) was the Kellogg Professor of International Relations at Carleton College before retiring in April 2013. His specialty was the political economy of East Asia, specifically China and Southeast Asia. He was the faculty director of an off-campus studies program at Carleton focusing on the political economy of these regions, and had previously taught a comparative off-campus studies seminar with Alfred Montero. Grow's course topics at Carleton included US Foreign Policy history, Intelligence Theory, Terrorism, Guerrilla Warfare and Insurgency, Chinese politics, Russian and Soviet Government, Political Economy, and Marxism. He died on June 16, 2013.

Grow served as a military interpreter and analyst in Asia. He later earned his PhD. from the University of Michigan in 1973. He was a speaker of Mandarin Chinese and Japanese.

Grow was a frequent contributor to Minnesota Public Radio, appearing often on the program Midday with Gary Eichten.
