= Aleksandr Nalivkin =

Russian footballer

Personal information
- Full name: Aleksandr Sergeyevich Nalivkin
- Date of birth: 18 March 1987
- Date of death: 11 June 2013 (aged 26)
- Height: 1.82 m (5 ft 11 1/2 in)
- Position: Forward

Senior career*
Years	Team	Apps	(Gls)
2006	FC Lokomotiv-KMV Mineralnye Vody (amateur)		
2007	FC Sochi-04	9	(0)
2007–2008	FC Krasnodar-2000	28	(5)
2009	FC Nizhny Novgorod	5	(0)
2009	FC Volga Tver	9	(2)
2010	FC Gornyak Uchaly	16	(4)
- * Club domestic league appearances and goals

Aleksandr Sergeyevich Nalivkin (Russian: Александр Серге́евич Наливкин; 18 March 1987 – 11 June 2013) was a Russian professional football player.

== Club career ==
He played in the Russian Football National League for FC Nizhny Novgorod in 2009.
