= Ahad Rajabli =

Azerbaijani judoka

Ahad Rajabli (Azerbaijani: Əhəd Rəcəbli, 1962 – 8 June 2013, Sumgayit) was a world champion in sambo and multiple sambo champion of Azerbaijan, as well as Judo Master of Sports. Rajabli also held the title of the Meritorious Coach of Azerbaijan.

Rajabli started to practice judo at the age of 12, then switched to sambo. He was the brother of the founder of Azerbaijani judo school Ahmed Rajabli. He later worked as a security guard at the Embassy of the United States in Azerbaijan.

On 8 June 2013 Rajabli committed suicide by hanging on his own black belt, presumably due to depression.
