= Länsi-Uusimaa =

- Type: Newspaper
- Format: Tabloid
- Owner: Media Group Keskisuomalainen
- Publisher: Etelä-Suomen Media
- Editor-in-chief: Päivi Kallo
- Founded: 1915
- Language: Finnish
- Headquarters: Lohja
- Website: https://www.lansi-uusimaa.fi

Länsi-Uusimaa is a regional Finnish-language newspaper published six times per week, serving the western Uusimaa region of Finland. The Wednesday edition is distributed as a blanket delivery to all households within the newspaper's distribution area. The publication's headquarters are located in Lohja, although it was originally established in Hanko in 1915.

Länsi-Uusimaa is produced by Etelä-Suomen Media, a subsidiary of the Keskisuomalainen media group. In addition to Lohja, the newspaper's distribution area encompasses the municipalities of Ingå, Raseborg, Vihti, Karkkila, and Siuntio. In March 2015, Länsi-Uusimaa adopted the tabloid format. Subsequently, in 2019, the publication schedule was revised so that the newspaper is now issued every day except Monday.
