= Teresita Barajuen =

Spanish Roman Catholic nun

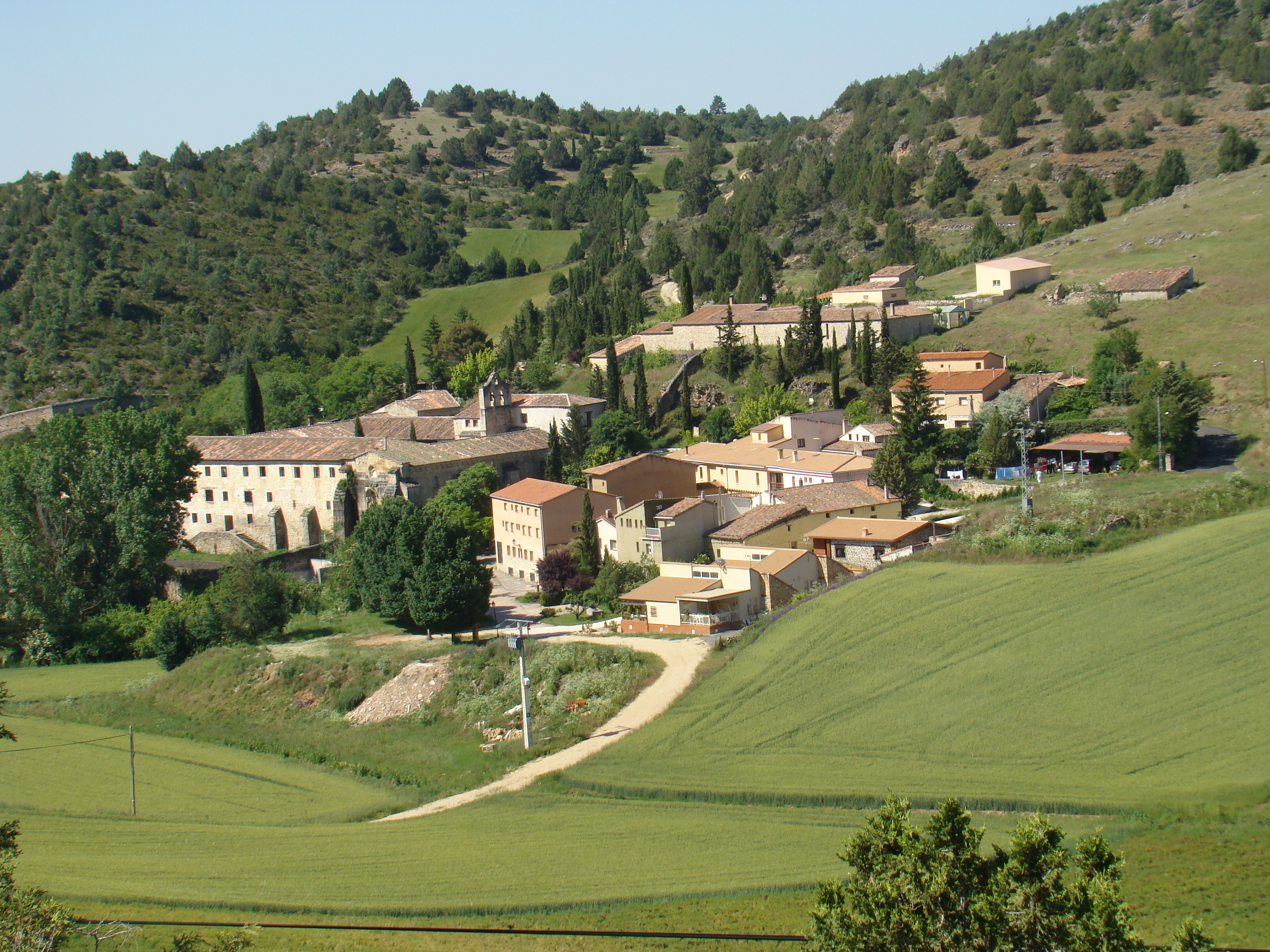
The Santa María de Buenafuente del Sistal monastery

Teresita Barajuen (16 September 1907 – 12 June 2013) was a Spanish Roman Catholic nun and member of the Order of Cistercians. Barajuen is believed to hold the world record for the longest service in cloister.

== Biography ==
Barajuen entered the Monastery of Santa María de Buenafuente del Sistal on 16 April 1927, when she was nineteen years old. She remained as a cloistered nun at the monastery for 86 years. In an interview with Portal de tu Ciudad Barajuen said that she did not originally intend to become a nun, but entered into religious life at the monastery due to family pressures.

She and her fellow nuns were forced to flee the monastery during the Spanish Civil War due to fighting in the region. In August 2011, Barajuen left the monastery for the first time in forty years to meet with Pope Benedict XVI, who was visiting Madrid for World Youth Day 2011. Barajuen had entered the cloistered monastery on 16 April 1927, the same day that Benedict XVI was born.

Barajuean was one of ten Spanish nuns featured in a 2013 book, What is a Girl Like You Doing In A Place Like This?, by Jesús García, a journalist with El Mundo. Barajuen died during the night of 12 June 2013, at the age of 105. Her death was reported by Sister Maria Romero, abbess of the Buenafuente del Sistal monastery.
