= Irwin Held =

American restaurateur (1925–2013)

Irwin Held (July 1, 1925 – June 17, 2013) was an American restaurateur, known for being a longtime owner of Barney's Beanery, a famous West Hollywood "beer-and-burger" restaurant, holding the establishment from 1970 to 1999. Held was born in The Bronx, New York in 1925, and following service in the Marines, he moved to Los Angeles in 1950. He took ownership of Barney's Beanery in 1970, two years after the death of its founder John Anthony. Held faced picketing and protest over his continued display of a sign over the bar that read “Fagots Stay Out”, purportedly posted by Anthony following a police raid of the restaurant's bathrooms in the 1940s. The introduction of an anti-discrimination ordinance in 1985 finally forced the reluctant Held to remove the sign under threat of fine. The restaurant was also famous for attracting rock musicians and stars including Jim Morrison and Janis Joplin. Held sold the restaurant in 1999, and died in 2013 of natural causes, survived by two daughters, a son and four grandchildren.
