= Ken Kinkor =

American pirate historian

Kenneth J. Kinkor
- Born: January 26, 1954
- Died: June 7, 2013 (aged 59)
- Education: Loras College
- Occupations: historian editor

Kenneth J. Kinkor (January 26, 1954 – June 7, 2013) was an American pirate historian.

Kinkor graduated from Loras College, Iowa, in 1976, majoring in history and political science, and pursued post-graduate studies in Iowa and Illinois. He moved to Massachusetts in 1986 and joined Historic Shipwrecks Inc., the company of underwater explorer Barry Clifford who had discovered the wreck of Samuel Bellamy's pirate vessel Whydah Gally off Cape Cod.

Kinkor would spend the next 27 years as Project Historian, researching the history of Whydah and other pirate, privateering, and historic wrecks. He would also make national television appearances on National Geographic Channel, Discovery Channel and History Channel as an expert in piracy.

Kinkor was the compiler and editor of the Whydah Sourcebook containing a vast collection of 17th and 18th century archival records concerning the history of the British slave ship Whydah Galley, its capture by the crew of pirate Samuel Bellamy, its demise at Cape Cod, and the court trial and testimonies of the surviving crew.

Kinkor also wrote the foreword of New England author Edward Rowe Snow's historic work Storms and Shipwrecks of New England, and was co-author with Barry Clifford of the National Geographic Society's exhibition catalog book Real Pirates: The Untold Story of the Whydah from Slave Ship to Pirate Ship and a special NAT GEO KIDS children's hardback edition of the same title.

Kinkor died on June 7, 2013, at the age of 59.
