= Shahnaz Himmeti =

Afghan politician (1978–2013)

Member of the House of the People from Herat Province
- In office 2005–2010
- In office 2010–2013

Personal details
- Born: 1978 Herat, Herat Province
- Died: June 3, 2013 (aged 34–35) Mashad, Iran
- Occupation: politician

Shahnaz Himmeti (died June 3, 2013) was an Afghan politician, who was the MP for Herat.

== Death ==
On June 3, 2013, she died in a traffic collision.
