= Gilma Jiménez =

Colombian politician

Gilma Jiménez (1956 – June 29, 2013) was a Colombian politician. She was a member of the Senate for Bogotá.

== Death ==
Jiménez died of cervical cancer on June 29, 2013, at the age of 57.
