= T. K. M. Bava Musliyar =

Indian Muslim scholar (1930-2013)

TKM Bava Musliyar
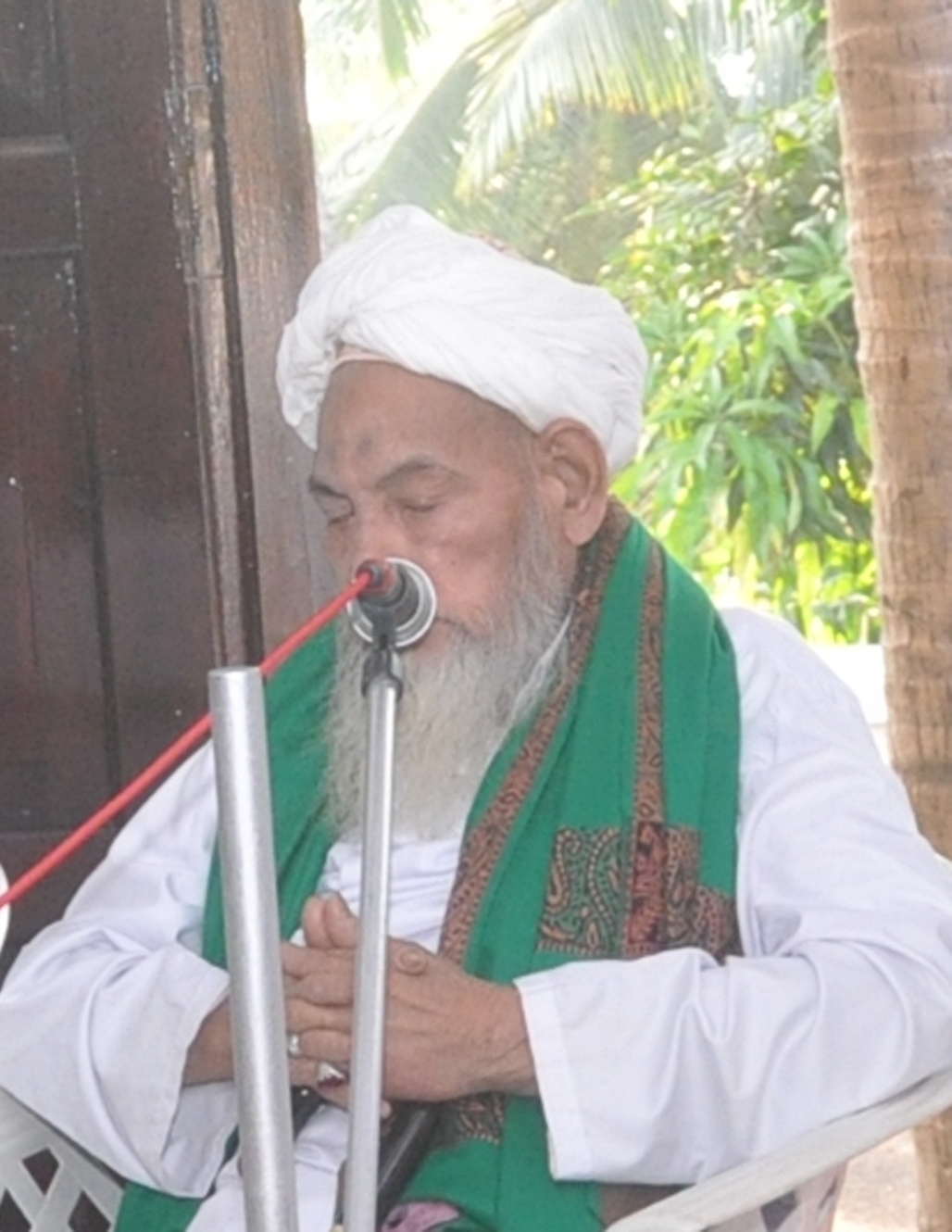
- TKM Bava Musliyar
- Born: Mohiyadeen; 21 July 1930; Vallimuk, Malappuram, Kerala, India
- Died: 16 June 2013; Vallimuk, Kerala, India
- Known for: Former president of Samastha Kerala Islam Matha Vidyabyasa Board, former Quazi of Kasaragod
- Spouse: Khadeeja
- Children: Muhammed Basheer Faiay and Abdul Majeed
- Parents: Beeran Kutty Musliyar (father); Fathima (mother)

Notes
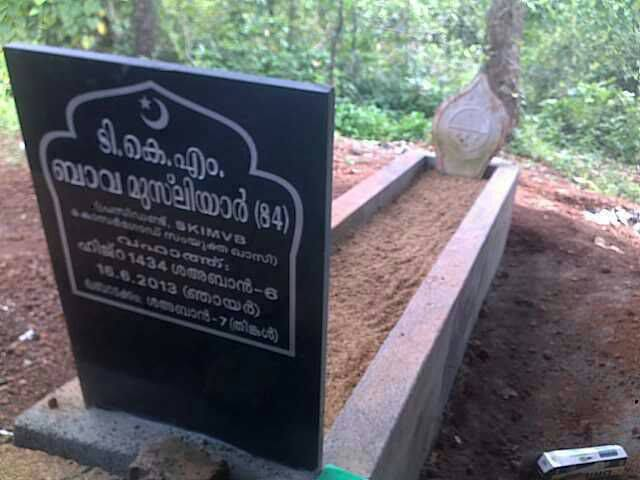

TKM Bava Musliyar was an Indian Muslim scholar and the former president of Samastha Kerala Islam Matha Vidyabyasa Board. Hailing from Malappuram, he served as Qazi (chief jurist) at Kasaragod for 25 years and had a reputation as a spiritual leader of the Malabar region. He introduced many revolutionary reforms in education system of the Vidyabyasa Board like a scientific pattern for fifth standard board exam and introduction of authentic and reliable way in evaluation.

== Early life ==
He was born on 21 July 1930, the son of Beeran Kutty Musliyar, scholar and cleric at Parambin peediaka and Fathima. After primary education at his own locality, he was enrolled in many Darses (Masjid based college) and was post graduated from Vellore Baqiyath Swalihath. His grandfathers Moideen Musliyar, Komu Musliyar, Kottumala Usthad, Paravanna Muhyadeen Musliyar, Sheikh Adam Hazrath and Sheikh Hassan Hazrath were his mentors. He was accompanied by CM Valiyullah, MM Basheer Musliyar, CH Hydrose Musliyar and KK Abdulla Musliyar.

== In the field of service ==
He was enrolled in Samastha Mushavara Board on 31 July 1976 and rendered his service until his demise. He took charge of Vallimuk Darse (masjid based seminary) on the behalf of his father Moideen Musliyar as latter left to Makka to perform Hajj. On 21 February 1989 he was elected as the president of Samastha Matha Vidyabyasa Board, one of the largest non-government educational agencies in Kerala, and occupied until his demise. He introduced many scientific reformation in board as he renovated board exam system and extended tenth to plus two classes. During his tenure as the chairman, the board published many texts even in Urdu language. After the demise of notable scholar EK Hasan Musliyar as the quazi (chief jurist) of Kasaragod, he was installed in throne on 18 May 1983 and served there until his demise. He was honored for his three decades of service in Malik Deenar Uroos.

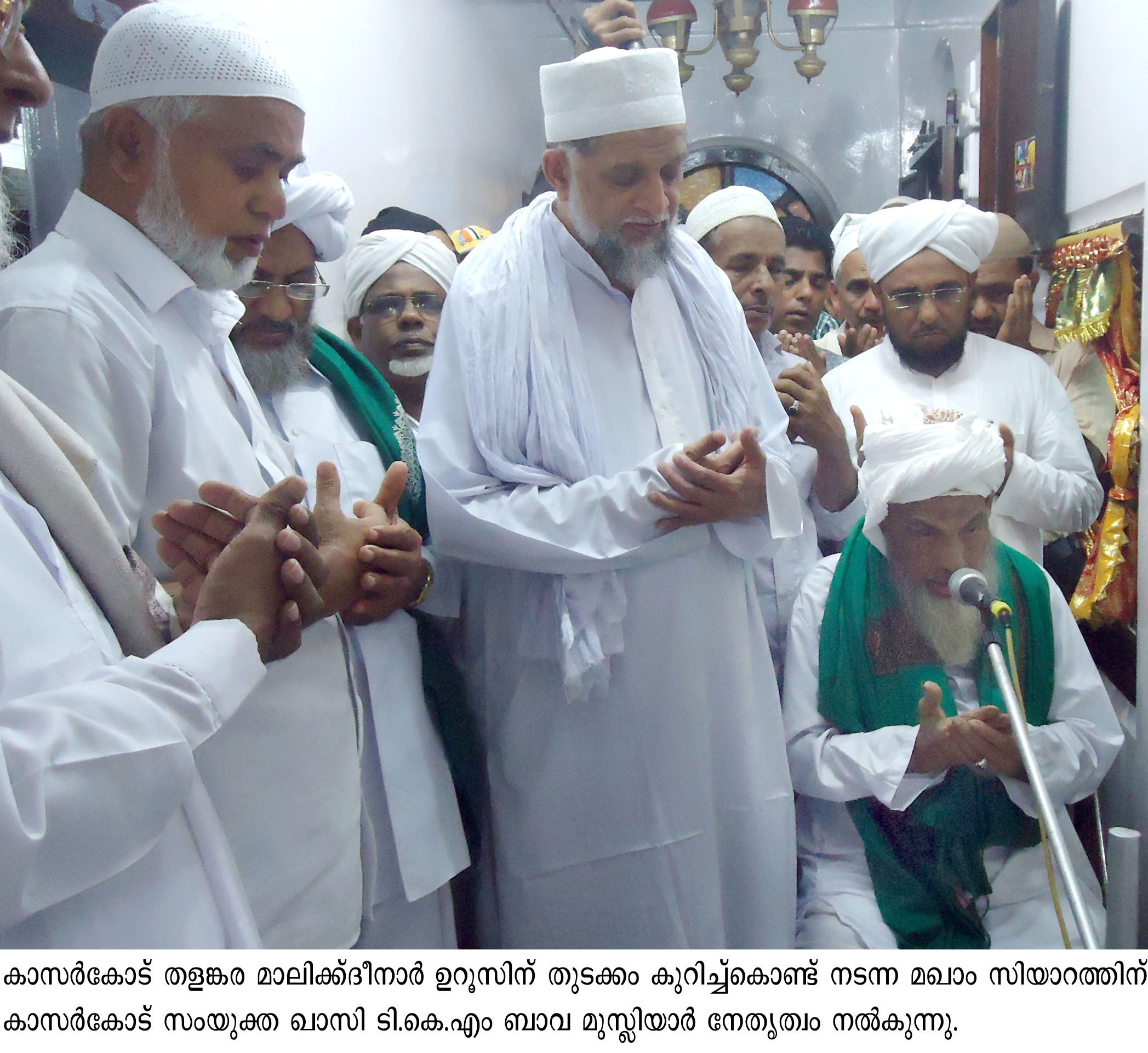

== Death ==
He died on 16 June 2013 at his residence in Velimukku from an age-related illness. He was interred in his own village.
