= Raghunath Bhattacharyya =

Indian judge

Raghunath Bhattacharyya (died 18 June 2013) was an Indian judge, serving in the Kolkata High Court from 2010 to his death.

== Death ==
Bhattacharyya died of COPD on 18 June 2013 at the age of 61.
