= Jeffrey Mathews =

South African cricketer (1943–2013)

Personal information
- Born: 19 May 1943; Louis Trichardt, South Africa
- Died: 6 June 2013 (aged 70); East London, Eastern Cape, South Africa
- Source: ESPNcricinfo, 3 June 2016

Jeffrey Mathews (19 May 1943 – 6 June 2013) was a South African cricketer. He played three first-class matches for Natal between 1974 and 1977.
