= Hugh Murray (York historian) =

Hugh Murray (c. 1923 – 8 June 2013) was a pre-eminent British historian of the city of York. He hated history at school but turned it into a second career after retiring from British Rail.

== Biography ==
Murray was born in Hull, fifth generation in a family of railwaymen. His father Donald was fish stock superintendent for the London and North East Railway (LNER).

Murray was educated at Brecon, St. Peter's School, York, and Jesus College, Oxford, where he read physics. He then joined British Rail, where he became divisional signals and telecommunications engineer at Norwich and later Leeds and ultimately moved to York to spend 14 years as signals engineer for the Eastern Railways region. He continued living in York after retiring in 1988.

Murray came into contact with asbestos during his early career with British Rail. He later moved to managerial roles but developed mesothelioma symptoms in 2012, almost 25 years after retiring.

Murray amassed his own library containing thousands of books and photographs and had an encyclopaedic knowledge of York, In 2004, he was presented with a British Association for Local Historyaward for personal achievement for his services to York's local history.

More than 1,500 lectures, a local history course that ran for 15 years, and a popular guided walks programme all inspired others to follow in Murray's footsteps. He had an impressive list of publications including articles in many local history and other journals, and published several books including A Golfing Odyssey: the Centenary History of York Railway Institute Golf Club. His first, in 1980, was a history of the horse tramways of York.

Murray was a leading member of the Yorkshire Architectural and York Archaeological Society, being chairman from 1991 to 2002, and was editor of Yorkshire Historian from 1984 to 2000. He was on the Council of the Friends of York Minster and the York Civic Trust, and in the Yorkshire Heraldry Society.

Murray had a particular interest in York Cemetery, which opened in 1837 and was rescued from ruin by an organisation of Friends. As a trustee, treasurer and administrator for many years, he created a database of all the burials which is now an invaluable research tool for other historians as well as people with relatives buried there.

Murray died of mesothelioma, from asbestos dust and fibres in workshops while he was a British Rail graduate signals apprentice in the mid-1950s. Murray was survived by his wife Jill.

== Family ==
In 2001, Murray married, late in life, Jill, a granddaughter of John Ward Knowles, the prominent York stained glass manufacturer of the late 19th and early 20th century.

== Publications ==
- Mr Micawber in York
- Monuments in York Minster: An Illustrated Inventory, co-authored with Ian R. Pattison, with drawings by Alison Daw, Friends of York Minster, 2000
