= Martin Arnold (journalist) =

American journalist (1929–2013)

Martin Arnold (May 14, 1929, New York City – June 4, 2013 Manhattan) was an American journalist who spent nearly four decades at The New York Times.

In 1968, Arnold received the George Polk Award for Political Reporting.

Arnold's positions at the Times included:

- media editor (early 1990s)
- book editor for Culture Desk and publishing columnist (late 1990s/early 2000s)

Arnold died on June 4, 2013, at his home in Manhattan from complications of Parkinson's disease. He was 84.

== Early life ==
Arnold was born Martin Katske to Arnold and Evelyn Katske, and raised on Long Island. When his father died, his mother changed their surname to Arnold. He earned a bachelor's degree from what was then Adelphi College in Garden City.
