= Vijay Telang =

Indian cricketer (1952–2013)

Vijay Shankar Telang (17 March 1952 – 18 June 2013) was an Indian cricketer who played for, captained, and later coached Vidarbha cricket team.

A right-hand batsman and very occasional medium-fast bowler who was born in Nagpur, Maharashtra, Telang played 58 first-class and one day matches for Vidarbha in the Ranji Trophy and Deodhar Trophy between 1970 and 1986, scoring nearly 3,000 runs.

After retirement, he became a coach for the domestic team's U-16 and U-19 sides, and later also became a selector for the First XI team. In 2012 he became the First XI coach, however he was diabetic and retired only months later on health grounds, and died less than a year later, aged 61. Played for central zone against visiting West Indies team. Scored 64 runs same as Dilip Vengsarkar who scored 64 and got selected to play for India.
