= Mal McBean =

Australian rules footballer

Personal information
- Full name: Malcolm John McBean
- Born: 4 October 1921; Footscray, Victoria
- Died: 26 June 2013 (aged 91)
- Original team: West Footscray
- Height: 180 cm (5 ft 11 in)
- Weight: 80 kg (176 lb)

Playing career^{1}
Years	Club	Games (Goals)
1944–45	Footscray	4 (0)
1946–49	St Kilda	55 (0)
Total		59 (0)
- ^{1} Playing statistics correct to the end of 1949.

Malcolm John McBean (4 October 1921 – 26 June 2013) was an Australian rules footballer who played with Footscray and St Kilda in the Victorian Football League (VFL).
