= Jaimie Leonard =

United States Army officer

- Born: January 29, 1974
- Died: June 8, 2013 (aged 39) Sharana, Afghanistan
- Buried: West Point Cemetery
- Allegiance: United States
- Branch: United States Army
- Rank: Major; Lieutenant colonel (posthumous)
- Conflicts: Iraq War; War in Afghanistan
- Awards: Valorous Unit Award
- Education: Marion Military Institute; United States Military Academy; Georgetown University (MPP)

Jaimie E Leonard (January 29, 1974 – June 8, 2013) was a lieutenant colonel in the United States Army and a part of the Headquarters and Headquarters Company, 2nd Brigade Combat Team, 10th Mountain Division, Fort Drum, New York. She was 39 years old when she died in Sharana, Afghanistan, as a result of a small arms-related injury. Previous deployments include Bosnia (1999), Iraq (2005), and Afghanistan in 2011 where she served as part of Regional Command South headquarters. In 2013, while on a subsequent deployment to Afghanistan, she was fatally injured in an insider attack in Paktika province. She was buried in the West Point Cemetery.

== Honors ==
Leonard was honored with two Bronze Stars, two Meritorious Service Medals, the Joint Commendation Medal, three Army Commendation Medals, the Valorous Unit Award, the Meritorious Unit Commendation, the National Defense Service Medal, Armed Forces Expeditionary Medal, Afghanistan Campaign Medals, Iraq Campaign Medal, the Global War on Terrorism Expeditionary Medal, the Global War on Terrorism Service Medal, the Korean Defense Service Medal, the Army Service Ribbon, five Overseas Service Ribbons, the NATO Badge, Parachutist Badge, and the Army Staff Identification Badge.
