= Ralph Graves (writer) =

American writer (1924–2013)

Ralph Augustus Graves (October 17, 1924 – June 10, 2013) was an American reporter, editor, and writer. He authored several novels and edited and contributed to famous periodicals such as Life magazine.

== Life ==
Graves was born October 17, 1924, in Washington, D.C. to Elizabeth and Ralph Graves. His father was an editor of National Geographic magazine and The Washington Times.

His mother in 1937 married Francis Bowes Sayre Sr., the last United States High Commissioner to the Philippines and the family resided there in the U.S. Embassy during his term. Graves was a high school student at the time of their arrival. They were evacuated from the embassy on Christmas Eve 1941 to the headquarters of General Douglas MacArthur in Corregidor, living in underground bunkers until escaping to Australia by submarine early in 1942.

Graves served in the United States Army Air Forces during the World War II. His service began in 1943 and concluded in 1945. Graves attained the rank of sergeant before leaving the armed forces.

Graves attended Williams College and later, Harvard University where he was a member of the Phi Beta Kappa honor society. He earned his B.A. from Harvard, being graduated in 1948.

Graves married Patricia Monser in 1950. Graves' marriage to Monser produced two children before the couple divorced. Graves remarried to Eleanor Mackenzie in 1958 and they also had two children.

Graves lived in New York City and maintained a second home in Sarasota, Florida.

== Professional career ==
Graves was employed as a writer and reporter at Life magazine from 1948 to 1958. He steadily rose through the ranks at Life magazine, serving as the articles editor, the assistant managing editor, and the managing editor before leaving the publication in 1972. Graves moved to Time, Inc. where he served as the senior staff editor and editorial director, among other positions. Graves was the final Managing Editor of Life Magazine when it issued the final Edition on December 29, 1972. His comments celebrated Life and reflected the sense of loss of a generation of American's at the loss of Life. Graves was a writer and held a chair on the Citizens' Crime Commission of New York.

== Literary works ==
Graves' writing career began in 1949 with the publication of Thanks for the Ride. His second book, The Lost Eagles, was published in 1955. This is a historical novel in which a fictional Roman, Severus Varus, searches for the legionary emblems lost by his kinsman, Quinctilius Varus, at the Battle of the Teutoburg Forest.

After a long break from writing books during his time at Life magazine, Graves resumed his literary career with the publication of August People in 1985. This work was followed in 1989 by Share of Honor, an in-depth look into Graves' personal involvement with the Japanese occupation of the Philippines during World War II.

Graves' novel, Orion: The Story of a Rape. was a fictionalized account of the rape of his daughter that occurred in Manhattan in 1983.

== Selected bibliography ==
- Thanks for the Ride (1949)
- The Lost Eagles (1955)
- August People (1985)
- Share of Honor (1989)
- Orion: The Story of a Rape: A Novel (1993)
- Tables of Content (1993) (co-written with Eleanor Graves)
- Martha's Vineyard: An Affectionate Memoir (1995) (co-written with Ray G. Ellis)
- Champagne Kisses, Cyanide Dreams (2001)

== Death ==
Graves died of kidney failure on June 10, 2013, at his home in Manhattan.
