= Timothy Apiyo =

Tanzanian civil servant and politician

Timothy Apiyo (died 10 June 2013) was a Tanzanian politician and civil servant. Throughout his career, he held significant positions and played a crucial role in shaping Tanzania's governance. The Prime Minister Mizengo Pinda led the nation in honoring Apiyo during his burial in Marasibora Village, Rorya District.
