= Hector Oaxaca Acosta =

Mexican photographer

Hector Oaxaca Acosta (March 13, 1926 – June 10, 2013), nicknamed "Chinito," was a Mexican news photographer and photojournalist. Based in Ciudad Juárez, Oaxaca's career spanned more than 67 years. He provided news photographs for a variety of Mexican and American publications and wire services, including El Fronterizo, El Mexicano, the Associated Press, and El Paso y Más, a Spanish-language paper published by the El Paso Times.

Oaxaca was born in Chihuahua to parents, David Oaxaca and María Acosta, on March 13, 1926. He was a cousin of actor Anthony Quinn.

Alejandro Cruz Rivera, the President of the Mexican Federation of Sports Journalists, noted that Oaxaca had "won just about every award a photographer in Mexico can win." In early June 2013, just one week before his death, the Las Misiones shopping center in Juárez opened a public exhibition of his work, entitled "Retrospective Photographs of Don Hector Oaxaca," which was curated by the Juárez Association of Journalists.

Hector Oaxaca Acosta died of an illness at his home on June 10, 2013, at the age of 87. He was survived by his wife, Garciela Echavarri, and two sons, Hector Oaxaca Echavarri and Francisco Javier Oaxaca Echavarri. He was a close friend of the former Mayor of El Paso, Carlos Ramirez.
