= Kampta Karran =

Guyanese writer (?–2013)

Kampta Karran (died June 5, 2013) was a Guyanese sociologist and author. He lectured at the University of Birmingham from 1999 to 2002, before joining the University of Warwick Centre for Research in Ethnic Relations as the Warwick Postgraduate Research Fellow in 2002. He also lectured at the University of Guyana and edited the journal Offerings. He had a wife, with whom he had four children.

Karran died at Skeldon Hospital in Guyana on June 5, 2013.

== Works ==
- Race and Ethnicity in Guyana: An Introductory Reader
- No Land, No Mother - Editors Lynn Macedo and Kampta Karran. 2007, Peepal Tree Press. (ISBN 9781845230203)
