= Alexander Grunauer =

Soviet scientist

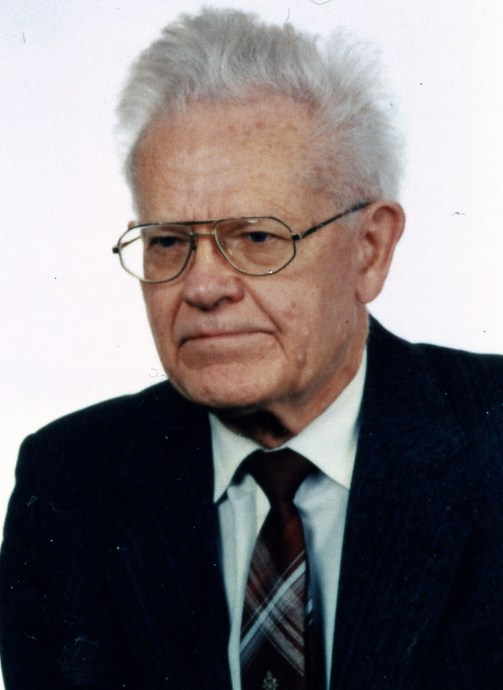
Alexander Grunauer.

Grunauer Alexander Adolfovich (October 4, 1921 – June 22, 2013) was a Soviet scientist and expert in the field of problems of regulation of internal combustion engines. An experienced teacher, professor. A Dr.Sci.Tech. (1969). Professor (1972). Chairman of department "Theory of mechanisms and machine" at the Kharkov polytechnical institute (1968—1993). The professor of the same department (1993—1994).

== Biography ==
Grunauer was born in Krasnodar. During the war he worked as a turner, the serviceman at factories of the tank industry in Stalingrad and Barnaul. He graduated from the Kharkov mechanical-machine-building institute (1948). After the institute he worked as the chief of power station at Vyatsko-Polyansky house-building industrial complex (1948—1950), at the Kharkov autorepair factory (1950—1951). From 1951 he worked at the Kharkiv Polytechnic Institute as assistant professor (1951—1961), as associate professor (1961—1968), and then as full professor, Chairman of the department (1968—1993), and emeritus professor (1993—1994).

The main direction of Grunauer's scientific activity is regulation of internal combustion engines. On the basis of research he had prepared a course "Automatic control of internal combustion engine" that takes up the problems of working out of analytical methods in the theory of mechanisms and the machine focused on the computer of various types. He reported at all-Union and international conferences on multiple occasions and published more than 100 scientific works, including four monographies. He supervised over the preparation of two doctors and 10 candidates of sciences. He developed and read lecture courses "Mechanics of robots" and "Numerical methods in engineering practice". He provided read courses with the necessary educational and methodical literature.

He was a member of specialised academic councils for defense candidate and theses for a doctoral degree. He worked as the associate editor and the editor of the collection "Theory of mechanisms and machine". From 1994 until his death, Grunauer lived in Germany, Kaiserslautern. He was a foreign member of National committee of Ukraine on "Theory of mechanisms and machine" (1994). He was awarded a medal "for valorous work in the Great Patriotic War 1941-1945".

== Publications ==
- Настенко Н.Н., Борошок В.Е., Грунауэр А.А. Регуляторы тракторных и комбайновых дизелей. – М.: Машгиз, 1963 г. – 352 с.
- Грунауэр А. А. Проектирование механизмов и машин с помощью цифровых ЭВМ. — Харьков : Вища школа : Изд-во при Харьк. ун-те, 1980.
- Снижение токсичности и повышение эксплуатационной экономичности транспортных энергоустановок / [А. А. Грунауэр, П. М. Канило, Е. Е. Коссов, И. Д. Долгих]; Под ред. А. А. Грунауэра. — Харьков : Вища школа : Изд-во при Харьк. ун-те, 1981.
- Методические рекомендации по теме «Программируемые микрокалькуляторы и их применение в учебном поцессе средних спецальных учебных заведений» / М-во высш. и сред. спец. образования УССР, Респ. науч.-метод. каб. по сред. спец. образованию; [Сост. А. А. Грунауэр]ю — Киев : РНМК по ССО, 1985.
- Грунауэр А. А., Долгих И. Д. Расчет и проектирование регуляторов ДВС : [Учеб. пособие] / М-во высш. и сред. спец. образования УССР, Учеб.-метод. каб. по высш. образованию, Харьк. политехн. ин-т им. В. И. Ленина. — Киев : УМКВО, 1988.
- Грунауэр А. А., Долгих И. Д. Применение ЭВМ для изучения динамики САР ДВС : [Учеб. пособие для спец. «Подъем.-трансп., строит., дор. машины и оборуд.»] /; М-во высш. и сред. спец. образования УССР, Учеб.-метод. каб. по высш. образованию, Харьк. политехн. ин-т им. В. И. Ленина. — Киев : УМКВО, 1989.
- Грунауэр А.А. Кайзерслаутерн – провинциальный и всемирно известный // Научно-культурологический журнал RELGA. – №2 [258] 25.01.2013.
