= Stanley A. Johnson =

American politician (1925–2013)

Stanley A. Johnson (January 13, 1925 – June 15, 2013) was an American politician, farmer, and Methodist minister.

Born near Mitchell, South Dakota, he served in the United States Army during World War II. He then farmed and was a Methodist minister. Johnson served in the South Dakota House of Representatives 1967-1976 as a Republican. He died in Tyndall, South Dakota.
