= Ron May (columnist) =

American journalist (1956–2013)

- Ron May conducting an interview with his trademark tape recorder.
- Born: April 1956
- Died: June 23, 2013 (aged 57); Chicago, Illinois, United States
- Occupation: Technology reporter

Ron May (1956–2013) was an American technology columnist covering events in the Chicago area. He published, edited, reported and commentated for an influential monthly newsletter called The May Report, which dealt with business issues in the high tech community in Chicago, Illinois, Indiana, Michigan, and Wisconsin. He has been described as "a fixture on the Chicago tech scene". He was often seen at Chicago tech community events such as BarCamp Chicago and Tech Cocktail, and was known among the community by his trademark tape recorder which he used to record many of his conversations. He died on June 23, 2013, from complications due to diabetes.

== Career ==
May was widely regarded as an investigative tech-industry watch dog. In 1992, May shifted his focus from general information technology to the discussion of high tech and software in Chicago. He was well known for his countering arguments against the ethics and effectiveness of programs, organizations, and businesses. He typically stood up for the little guy or underdog.
