= James Njiru =

Kenyan politician

James Njiru (died 26 June 2013) was a politician from Kirinyaga County in the Republic of Kenya. He served in president Jomo Kenyatta's government as an assistant minister of Health, in president Daniel Moi's Government as a cabinet Minister in the docket of National Guidance and Political Affairs as well as the Ministry of Culture and Social Services. He was as a Member of Kirinyaga Parliament for many years.

== Death ==
Njiru died of cancer on 26 June 2013.

== Family ==
He was husband to Jane Wangeci Njiru and the father to Ken Njiru, Stephen Njiru, Irene Njiru, Richard Mwangi Njiru, Ann Njiru, Jacqueline Njiru, and Daniel Njiru.
