= Alfred O. Schumann =

American politician

Alfred Oscar "Al" Schumann (March 27, 1924 – June 21, 2013) was an American farmer and politician.

Born in Eyota, Minnesota, Schumann went to the University of Minnesota. He was a dairy farmer. From 1963 to 1973, Schumann served in the Minnesota House of Representatives and was a Republican. Schumann also served as mayor of Eyota, Minnesota. In his later years he sold a portion of his farmland for development on the South side of Eyota. He built and sold a number of homes. Schumann also established the Eyota Market, the first grocery store in Eyota in the 21st century. The store is currently owned and operated by his descendants. Schumann died in Eyota, Minnesota.
