= Jack McGrath (footballer) =

Australian rules footballer

Personal information
- Full name: John Patrick Joseph McGrath
- Born: 13 February 1924; Colac, Victoria
- Died: 6 June 2013 (aged 89)
- Original team: Swan Marsh
- Height: 180 cm (5 ft 11 in)
- Weight: 79 kg (174 lb)

Playing career^{1}
| Years | Club | Games (Goals) |
| 1948–50 | Geelong | 7 (0) |
- ^{1} Playing statistics correct to the end of 1950.

John Patrick Joseph McGrath (13 February 1924 – 6 June 2013) was an Australian rules footballer who played with Geelong in the Victorian Football League (VFL).

In his last game he injured his leg against the Essendon Bombers, which resulted in him having to finish his VFL career .
