= Albert Legogie =

Nigerian politician (1947–2013)

Deputy Senate President of Nigeria
- In office 5 December 1992 – 17 November 1993
- President: Ibrahim Babangida

Senator for Edo North Senatorial District
- In office 1992–1993

Personal details
- Born: 1947
- Died: 17 June 2013
- Party: Social Democratic Party
- Occupation: Politician

Albert Legogie (1947 – 17 June 2013) was a Nigerian politician. He was a member of the Senate for Edo North.

Senator Albert Legogie was a former deputy senate president in the defunct Third Republic and a pioneer member of the Board of Trustees of the Peoples Democratic Party (PDP).

== Death ==
Legogie died on 17 June 2013 at the age of 76.
