= Leopoldo López Escobar =

Ángel Leopoldo López-Escobar (1940 – June 29, 2013) was a Chilean geochemistry academic. His scientific career begun by studying Biology and Chemistry at the Pontifical Catholic University of Chile. Later he worked at the Austral University of Chile and the University of Chile. In 1996 he started a metallogeny research group at the University of Concepción.
