= Michel Ostyn =

Belgian physiologist

- Born: 7 October 1924; Nieuwekerke, Belgium
- Died: 5 June 2013 (aged 88); Leuven, Belgium
- Citizenship: Belgium
- Education: Katholieke Universiteit Leuven
- Known for: sports medicine, health issues in athletics
- Spouse: Emma Van Molle (died 14 November 1984)
- Awards: Philip Noel Baker Award, 1982 (International Council of Sport Science and Physical Education)
- Scientific career
- Fields: Physiologist, Exercise Physiologist

Michel Ostyn (7 October 1924 – 5 June 2013) was a Belgian physiologist, sports physician and sports medicine pioneer.

== Early life ==
Ostyn was born in Nieuwekerke, in the province of West Flanders, Belgium, the second of four children born to Maurice Joseph Ostyn (died 1940) and Madeleine Vanden Weeghe (died 25 March 1968). Maurice Ostyn died during the Battle of Dunquerq at age 42 on 29 May 1940 in Veurne, apparently by friendly fire after going upstairs and leaving his family behind in the basement where they were seeking shelter. His mother then with her four sons fled West-Flanders and settled in Leuven in the Belgian province of Brabant. It is there that Michel later would attend the Catholic University of Leuven.

== Academic career ==
Michel 'Mic' Ostyn studied medicine at the Catholic University of Leuven from which he graduated in 1951. Following his studies in medicine, Ostyn also successfully completed a Master's ('Licentiate') Degree in Occupational Medicine at the university's Hoger Institute van de Arbeid in 1955. After graduating he quit running though. His talent as an athlete and physician and his outspoken interests in physiology and sports medicine caught the eye of physiologist Pierre-Paul De Nayer, the Founding Dean of the university's Institute for Physical Education (ILO). De Nayer convinced Ostyn to stay at the university and build out a career in sports medicine.

In 1955 Ostyn became a laureate of the Belgian Academy of Medicine after a study about the physiology of exercise. In 1982 the International Council of Sport Science and Physical Education (ICSSPE) awarded Ostyn the Philip Noel Baker Award for his contributions to sports medicine.

Ostyn's energetic and charismatic personality made him into a leading international personality in sports medicine. He combined his job as an academic educator and scholar with several other functions. Since 1955 he would be treasurer of the International University Sports Federation (FISU). He was also president and founding member of the Belgian Society for Sports Medicine & Sports Science, and chaired the first Belgian Anti-doping Committee. He was a founder of the Institute of Physical Education's scholarly periodical 'Hermes' in which he regularly authored articles himself. He also founded the sports medical clinic at the Institute of Physical Education, in which he would provide advice and support to both students and top athletes. After P-P. De Nayer's retirement, Ostyn became Chair (Dean) of the Institute of Physical Education, which he remained until 1986. During that time he was an adviser to numerous research students in kinesiology and in physical therapy. His research interests included sports injuries, metabolic and endocrine responses to exercise, cardiopulmonary physiology, and regulation of carbohydrate and fat metabolism.

The death of his wife, Emma Van Molle, at age 57 on 14 November 1984 of ovarian cancer, greatly affected him. In turn, Ostyn sharply cut his academic and scholarly activities. He had also been saddened by the sudden death five years later (1989) of his close friend and colleague, the famed track and field coach Mon Vanden Eynde, after the latter sustained a fatal heart attack.

Ostyn became an emeritus professor in 1989, but would continue fulfilling his obligations as an adviser to those students whose doctoral work he was supervising. He was a mentor and adviser to the first Masters and PhD students in advanced sports medicine, such as notably, cardiologist Robert H. Fagard, physical medicine & rehabilitation specialist Roeland Lysens, and reproductive endocrinologist, exercise physiologist and judo expert Carl De Crée, who all three later became professors in their fields.

== Post-academic career ==
Following Ostyn's retirement the University of Leuven in honor of his important contributions to the university and the world of sports medicine in general, established a yearly lecture series for which a leading international scholar is invited. Shortly after concluding his final roles as a dissertation adviser, he ceased all scholarly activity, and after incurring a cerebral hemorrhage he had been living in a retirement home in Leuven, where he died on 5 June 2013, aged 88. He was interred in the family grave at De Jacht cemetery in Heverlee, a military cemetery where mostly fallen British World War II soldiers and Belgian war veterans are buried.

== Sporting Competitions Highlights ==
As a student, Ostyn became an enthusiastic track and field runner specializing in middle-long distances establishing several university records during between 1947 and 1950, although he considered himself primarily an 800m runner.

== Notable Bibliography ==
- Kinanthropometry II. Volume 9 of International Series on Sport Science (1980)
