= Farid Khan (politician) =

Pakistani politician

Farid Khan (Urdu/Pashto: فرید خان) was a Pakistani politician who was elected to the Provincial Assembly of Khyber Pakhtunkhwa in the 2013 general election. Khan was an independent candidate from the PK-42 constituency of Hangu. He won the seat by securing 16,129 votes, defeating a Jamiat Ulema-i-Islam (JUI-F) contestant in the polls. He joined the Pakistan Tehreek-e-Insaf upon being elected to the provincial assembly. He was assassinated on 3 June 2013 in Hangu.

== Political career ==
Khan was reputed to have come from a lower-income background and was said to possess only 100 rupees in his pocket when he had submitted his nomination papers before the election. His origins were in the Orakzai Agency of the tribal areas.

== Assassination ==
On 3 June 2013, unidentified gunmen opened fire on Farid Khan's vehicle while he was travelling in Hangu. Khan died as a result of the attack, while his driver and guard sustained injuries. Soon after the attack, security forces conducted a joint operation and arrested a local TTP commander in Hangu.

On 25 June 2013, police arrested a suspect named Asifullah in Islamabad who confessed to killing Farid Khan. According to police, Asifullah had been imparted terrorism training for four years.
