= Margaret Jackson (secretary) =

British government secretary (1917–2013)

Member of Southwark London Borough Council

Personal details
- Born: 15 January 1917
- Died: 2 June 2013 (aged 96) London
- Military career
- Rank: Major-General
- Conflicts: World War II
- Awards: MBE

Margaret Wallace Jackson MBE (15 January 1917 – 2 June 2013) was principal secretary to the Director General of the SOE, member of the OEEC, and Southwark Councillor.

Jackson was home-educated by a governess until she was thirteen. She then attended a Methodist school.

By 1940 she was working for the Royal Institution of International Affairs, from here she moved to the military until SOE was formed in November 1940, where she worked for Colin Gubbins until it was disbanded in 1946.

Jackson then joined the Allied Commission for Austria, and was present, taking notes, and the quadripartite meetings.

In 1952 she joined the Foreign Office as an information officer and was poster to Melbourne.

After her return to England she was Conservative councillor for the London Borough of Southwark for eight years.

== Family and personal life ==
Jackson, who was unmarried, was born to Scottish parents, and brought up in Argentina, until 1934.

== Bibliography ==
- Peter Wilkinson and Joan Bright Astley, Gubbins and SOE, London, Leo Cooper, 1993, ISBN 0-85052-556-X.
- Leo Marks, Between Silk and Cyanide
- Bines, Jeffery (2008). The Polish Country Section of the Special Operations Executive 1940-1946: A British Perspective (PDF) (PhD dissertation). University of Stirling. hdl:1893/929. (Mentions setting up censorship with the Polish speaking FANYs)
