= List of Canadian Football League retired numbers =

This is a complete list of Canadian Football League (CFL) retired numbers. A retired number is a jersey number that is no longer issued by a team in order to honour a player that had a significant impact on that franchise. In some cases, a player may have his number retired after his untimely death during or soon after his playing career.

Of the seven current franchises that retire jersey numbers, there have been 53 players to have their numbers officially retired. Ironically, the two youngest franchises, the BC Lions and Montreal Alouettes, have retired the most numbers 11 each. The oldest continuous franchise in the league, the Toronto Argonauts, has the second fewest with four retired numbers. The Hamilton Tiger-Cats have the fewest retired numbers, with three. The CFL considers the histories of the Ottawa Rough Riders, Ottawa Renegades, and Ottawa Redblacks as one continuous franchise, so the jersey numbers represented by the Redblacks here include all three of these franchises. The Edmonton Elks and Winnipeg Blue Bombers have never formally retired a jersey number and instead honour numbers and, in some instances, do not re-issue them.

The most commonly retired number, if one includes Winnipeg's unofficial retired numbers, is the number 75, which has had its usage been discontinued by four teams. No player has had his number retired by multiple teams and, unlike Major League Baseball (who retired Jackie Robinson's number), the National Basketball Association (Bill Russell), and the National Hockey League (Wayne Gretzky), the CFL has never had a jersey number retired in favour of one player league-wide. Due to their short existence, none of the American-based CFL teams ever retired jersey numbers.

== Retired numbers ==
Elected to the Canadian Football Hall of Fame

Player	No.	Team	Position	Tenure	Championships	Refs
Lui Passaglia (Note: Elected to the Canadian Football Hall of Fame)	5	BC Lions	K/P	1976–2000	1985, 1994, 2000	
Willie Fleming	15	BC Lions	RB	1959–1966	1964	
Joe Kapp	22	BC Lions	QB	1961–1966	1964	
Jim Young	30	BC Lions	SB/WR	1967–1979	–	
Byron Bailey	38	BC Lions	FB/DB	1954–1964	1964	
Al Wilson	52	BC Lions	C	1972–1986	1985	
Solomon Elimimian	56	BC Lions	LB	2010–2018	2011	
Jamie Taras	60	BC Lions	FB/OL	1987–2002	1994, 2000	
Norm Fieldgate	75	BC Lions	E/LB	1954–1967	1964	
Geroy Simon	81	BC Lions	SB/WR	2001–2012	2006, 2011	
Brent Johnson	97	BC Lions	DE	2001–2011	2006, 2011	
Harry Hood	5	Calgary Stampeders	RB/QB	1948–1952	1948	
Willie Burden	10	Calgary Stampeders	RB	1974–1981	–	
Mark McLoughlin	13	Calgary Stampeders	K	1988–2003	1992, 1998, 2001	
Allen Pitts	18	Calgary Stampeders	WR	1990–2000	1992, 1998	
Tom Forzani	22	Calgary Stampeders	WR	1973–1983	–	
Wayne Harris	55	Calgary Stampeders	LB	1961–1972	1971	
Stu Laird	75	Calgary Stampeders	DT	1984–1996	1992	
Bernie Faloney	10	Hamilton Tiger-Cats	QB	1957–1964	1957, 1963	
Garney Henley	26	Hamilton Tiger-Cats	DB/FL	1960–1975	1963, 1965, 1967, 1972	
Angelo Mosca	68	Hamilton Tiger-Cats	DT	1958–1959, 1963–1972	1963, 1965, 1967, 1972	
Anthony Calvillo	13	Montreal Alouettes	QB	1998–2013	2002, 2009, 2010	
Mike Pringle	27	Montreal Alouettes	RB	1996–2002	2002	
George Dixon	28	Montreal Alouettes	RB	1959–1965	–	
Herb Trawick	56	Montreal Alouettes	G/T/DL	1946–1957	1949	
Pierre Desjardins	63	Montreal Alouettes	G/T	1966–1971	1970	
Peter Dalla Riva	74	Montreal Alouettes	TE/SB	1968–1981	1970, 1974, 1977	
Hal Patterson	75	Montreal Alouettes	WR/DB	1954–1960	–	
Junior Ah You	77	Montreal Alouettes	DE	1972–1981	1974, 1977	
Virgil Wagner	78	Montreal Alouettes	HB	1946–1954	1949	
Ben Cahoon	86	Montreal Alouettes	SB	1998–2010	2002, 2009, 2010	
Sam Etcheverry	92	Montreal Alouettes	QB	1952–1960	–	
Ron Stewart	11	Ottawa Redblacks	RB	1958–1970	1960, 1968, 1969	
Russ Jackson	12	Ottawa Redblacks	QB	1958–1969	1960, 1968, 1969	
Whit Tucker	26	Ottawa Redblacks	WR	1962–1970	1968, 1969	
Bruno Bitkowski	40	Ottawa Redblacks	C/DE	1951–1962	1951, 1960	
Jim Coode	60	Ottawa Redblacks	OT	1974–1980	1976	
Moe Racine	62	Ottawa Redblacks	OT/K	1958–1974	1960, 1968, 1969, 1973	
Bobby Simpson	70	Ottawa Redblacks	FW/E/DB	1950–1962	1951, 1960	
Gerry Organ	71	Ottawa Redblacks	K/P/WR	1971–1983	1973, 1976	
Tony Golab	72	Ottawa Redblacks	FW/HB	1939–1941, 1945–1950	1940	
Tony Gabriel	77	Ottawa Redblacks	TE	1975–1981	1976	
Ron Lancaster	23	Saskatchewan Roughriders	QB	1963–1978	1966	
George Reed	34	Saskatchewan Roughriders	RB	1963–1975	1966	
Dave Ridgway	36	Saskatchewan Roughriders	K	1982–1995	1989	
Mel Becket	40	Saskatchewan Roughriders	TE/C	1952–1956	–	
Roger Aldag	44	Saskatchewan Roughriders	OL	1976–1992	1989	
Mario DeMarco	55	Saskatchewan Roughriders	OL	1953–1956	–	
Ray Syrnyk	56	Saskatchewan Roughriders	OL	1956	–	
Gordon Sturtridge	73	Saskatchewan Roughriders	DE	1953–1956	–	
Dick Shatto	22	Toronto Argonauts	RB	1954–1965	–	
Michael Clemons	31	Toronto Argonauts	RB/SB/KR/PR	1989–2000	1991, 1996, 1997	
Joe Krol	55	Toronto Argonauts	QB/RB/P/K/DB	1945–1952, 1955	1945, 1946, 1947, 1950, 1952	
Danny Nykoluk	60	Toronto Argonauts	OT	1955, 1957–1971	–	

== Unofficially retired numbers ==
Elected to the Canadian Football Hall of Fame

Elected to the Canadian Football Hall of Fame and the Pro Football Hall of Fame

Player	No.	Team	Position	Tenure	Championships	Refs
Warren Moon (Note: Elected to the Canadian Football Hall of Fame and the Pro Football Hall of Fame)	1	Edmonton Elks	QB	1978–1983	1978, 1979, 1980, 1981, 1982	
Don Warrington	21	Edmonton Elks	RB	1971–1980	1975, 1978, 1979, 1980	
Rollie Miles	98	Edmonton Elks	RB/DB/LB/KR	1951–1961	1954, 1955, 1956	
Bob Cameron	6	Winnipeg Blue Bombers	P	1980–2002	1984, 1988, 1990	
Ken Ploen	11	Winnipeg Blue Bombers	QB/DB	1957–1967	1958, 1959, 1961, 1962	
Jeff Nicklin	28	Winnipeg Blue Bombers	HB/FW	1934–1940	1935, 1939	
Chris Walby	63	Winnipeg Blue Bombers	OT	1981–1996	1984, 1988, 1990	
Tommy Lumsden	75	Winnipeg Blue Bombers	G/E	1951–1954	–	
Milt Stegall	85	Winnipeg Blue Bombers	SB	1995–2008	–	

== See also ==
- Edmonton Elks Wall of Honour
