= Retired number =

Honor in team sports

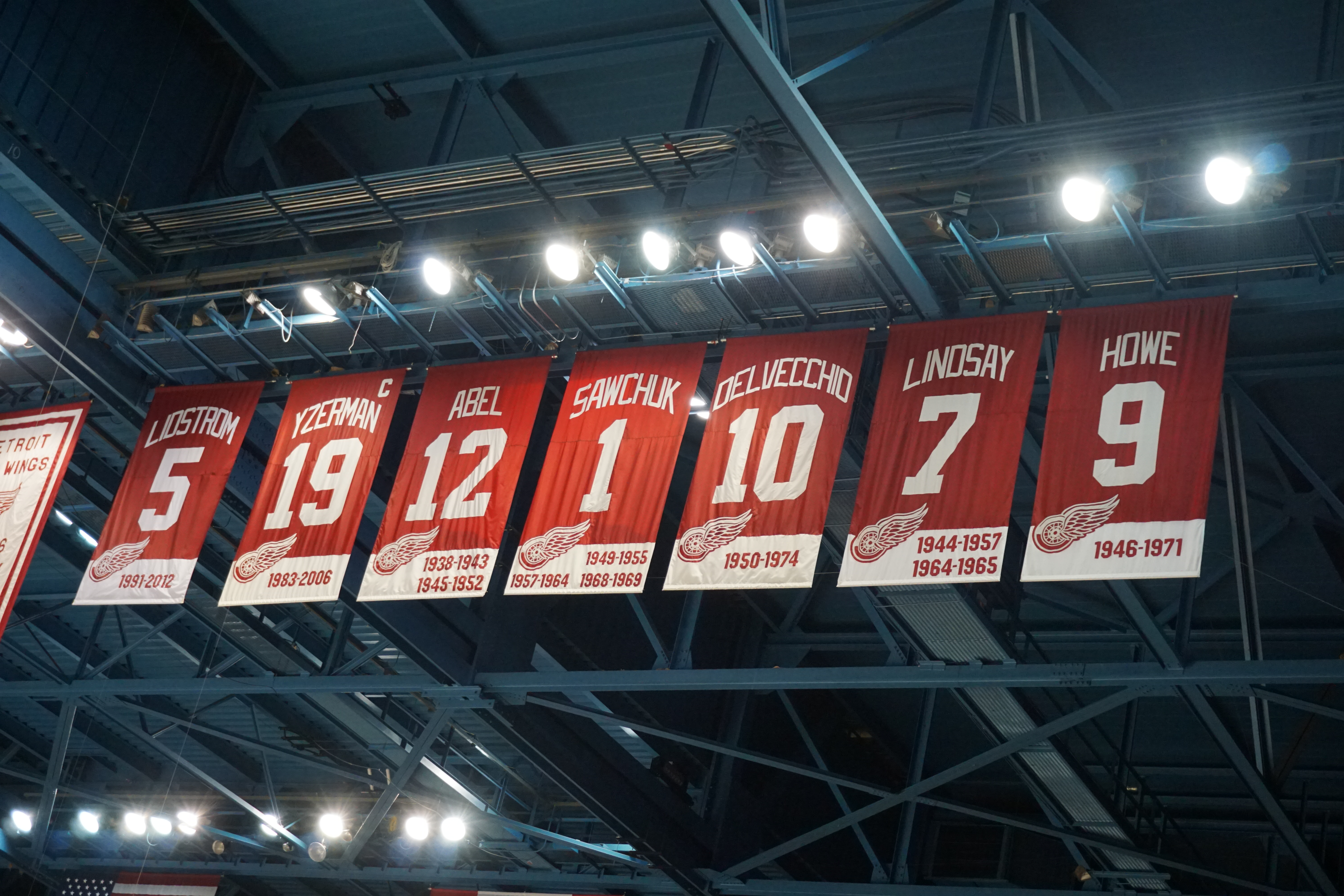
Numbers retired by the Detroit Red Wings of the NHL, displayed at the former Joe Louis Arena in December 2015

Retiring the number of an athlete is an honor a team bestows upon a player, usually after the player has left the team, retires from the sport, or dies, by taking the number formerly worn on their uniform out of circulation. Once a number is retired, no future player from the team may wear it, unless the original player permits it; however, in many cases the number cannot be used at all. Such an honor may also be bestowed on players who had highly memorable careers, died prematurely under tragic circumstances, or have had their promising careers ended by serious injury. Some sports that retire team numbers include baseball, cricket, ice hockey, basketball, American football, and association football. Retired numbers are often referred to as "hanging from the rafters" as they are so displayed in the team's home venue, either emblazoned on jerseys with the players' names or made into appropriately colored/styled banners. It is often considered the "greatest/highest honor" individual teams can grant their greatest players.

The first number officially retired by a team in a professional sport was that of ice hockey player Ace Bailey, whose number 6 was retired by the Toronto Maple Leafs in 1934.

Some teams in sports with eleven players per side (such as association and gridiron football) have retired number 12 in honor of their fans, or the "twelfth man". Similarly, the Sacramento Kings and Orlando Magic retired number 6 in honor of their fans, the "sixth man". A team may decide to retire a number in honor of tragedies involving the team's city or state. For example, the number 58 was retired in 2018 by the Vegas Golden Knights hockey team in honor of the 58 victims killed in the 2017 Las Vegas shooting.

== North American sports leagues ==
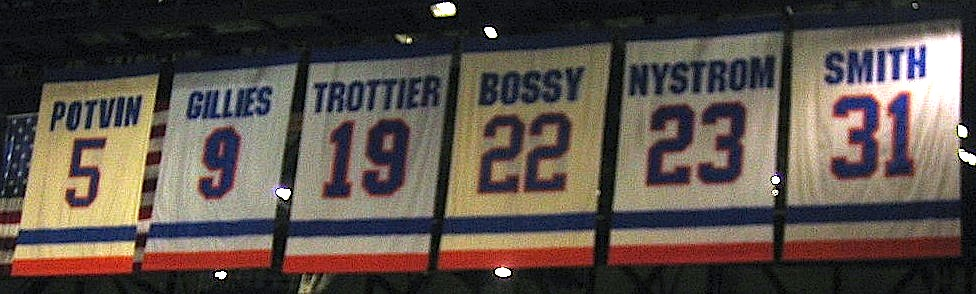
Jersey numbers retired by the National Hockey League's New York Islanders as of 2007

If a jersey is retired and an active player is still wearing it, the player is usually permitted to wear the number for the remainder of their playing career with that team. If the player later becomes a coach or manager for the same team, and the sport is one in which coaches and managers wear uniform numbers, then the player may wear the retired number for the duration of their career with the team in this capacity. In some cases, teams may allow the child of a player to use their parent's retired number should they later play for the same team; an example came in 2025 when Jacob Wilkins joined the University of Georgia basketball team wearing the #21 jersey, the same number used by his father Dominique and retired after his career with the Bulldogs.

However, in some cases, the player may still elect to change their number. For instance, in 1987 the Boston Bruins of the National Hockey League decided to retire jersey number 7 in honor of Phil Esposito, who had become a star while playing for the team. At the time #7 belonged to Ray Bourque, who was the Bruins' captain and had become a star in his own right. On the night of the ceremony honoring Esposito, Bourque took to the ice wearing his normal #7 jersey, which he had worn since breaking into the league in 1979. He skated over to the Hall of Famer, took off his #7 jersey, and handed it to Esposito in what was referred to as Bourque's "surrendering" of #7 to Esposito. Underneath was a jersey numbered 77, which would become as associated with Bourque as #7 had been with Esposito in Boston. Bourque's new jersey number would eventually join Esposito's in the rafters of TD Garden, as the Bruins retired his #77 following his 2001 retirement.

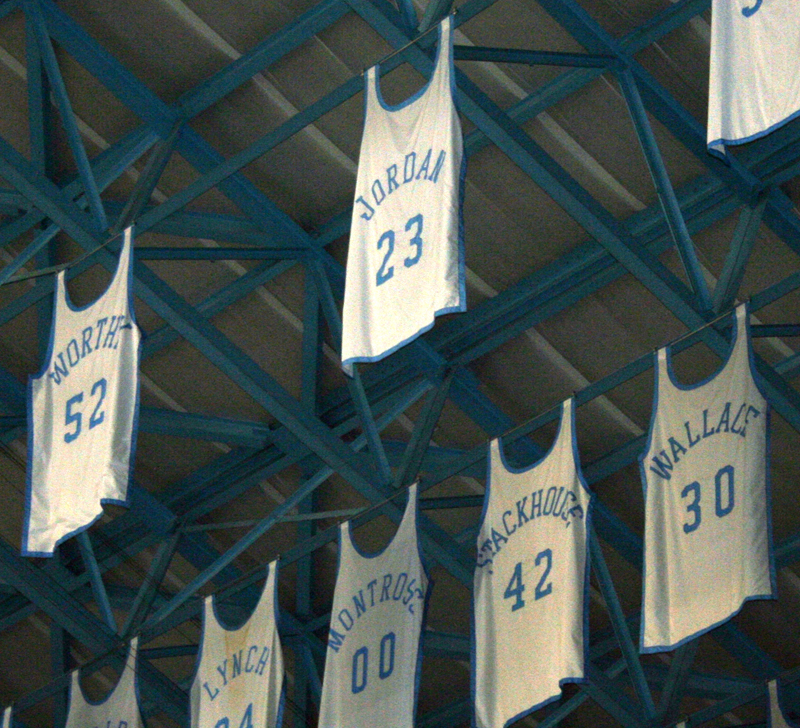
North Carolina basketball retired numbers (with Michael Jordan's #23 jersey among them) in the rafters at the Dean Smith Center

In rare cases, a number may be retired because of the player's endeavors in other fields. For example, former college football star Gerald Ford's number 48 was retired by the University of Michigan football squad under his future career as the 38th President of the United States.

Teams also take numbers out of circulation without formally retiring them, though it is generally understood that those numbers will never be issued again. For example, the Pittsburgh Steelers have only officially retired three numbers: Ernie Stautner's #70, Joe Greene's #75 and Franco Harris' #32. However, they have not reissued the numbers of several of their greatest players since they retired, and it is understood that no Steeler will ever wear them again. For example, Bradshaw's #12 had not been reissued since he retired in 1984. Similarly, except for a pair of quarterbacks in the mid-1980s, the Green Bay Packers have not re-issued Paul Hornung's number 5 since he departed from the team following the 1966 season. The Dallas Cowboys do not officially retire numbers, but it is generally understood that Roger Staubach's #12, Bob Lilly's #74, Troy Aikman's #8, and Emmitt Smith's #22 will never be issued again (though the Cowboys have occasionally used Lilly's 74 in the preseason). Additionally, after Peyton Manning was released by the Indianapolis Colts in 2012, owner Jim Irsay stated that no Colt would ever wear Manning's #18 again, though it was not officially retired until 2017. After he departed from the team in 2004, the Lakers removed Shaquille O'Neal's #34 from circulation, only officially retiring it in 2013.

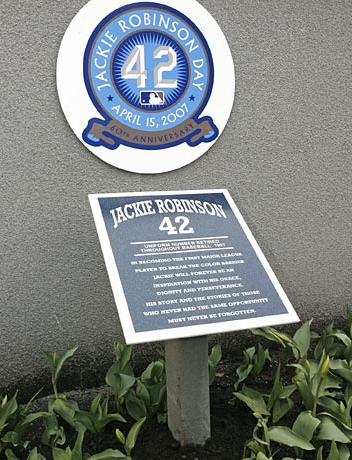
A plaque honoring Jackie Robinson in Monument Park at old Yankee Stadium. His 42 number was retired for all MLB teams in 1997

Some teams either formally or informally take a jersey out of circulation when a player dies or has their career ended by serious injury or disease. For instance, between 1934 and 2016, the Toronto Maple Leafs only retired a player's number if he experienced a career-ending incident while playing for the team. As a result, they had only retired two jerseys in their history during that time; Ace Bailey's #6 was retired after he suffered a career-ending head injury and Bill Barilko's #5 was retired after his disappearance and presumed death on a fishing trip (his death was confirmed years later with the discovery of the wreckage of the plane on which he was flying). The New York Yankees retired Lou Gehrig's #4 after he was forced to retire due to amyotrophic lateral sclerosis. The New York Jets did not reissue the #90 of Dennis Byrd following a career-ending neck injury in 1992, and it was understood long before its formal retirement in 2012 that no Jet would ever wear it again. Similarly, after Wayne Chrebet was forced to retire after suffering multiple concussions, the Jets took his #80 out of circulation but have not yet retired it; Byrd and Curtis Martin were the most recent Jets to have their numbers retired as both were done on the same day. After Magic Johnson retired because of his HIV disease, the Lakers retired his jersey #32.

In 2008, Princeton University retired the number 42 for all Princeton Tigers sports teams in honor of Bill Bradley and Heisman Trophy winner Dick Kazmaier. UCLA retired the same number in 2014 for all Bruins sports teams in honor of Jackie Robinson, who had played in four sports at the school before his Hall of Fame baseball career. Although Robinson never wore #42 at UCLA, the school chose it because of its indelible identification with Robinson.

In 2011, Michigan Wolverines football unretired all of the numbers that it had retired to create legends jerseys worn by its best players. The unretired jerseys were Bennie Oosterbaan's No. 47, Gerald Ford's No. 48, Ron Kramer's No. 87, The Wistert Brothers' (Whitey Wistert, Al Wistert, Alvin Wistert) No. 11 and Tom Harmon's No. 98. In 2015, the Legends program was discontinued, and the numbers re-retired.

On December 18, 2017, Kobe Bryant became the only player to have had two numbers (8, 24) retired by the same franchise, Los Angeles Lakers.

=== Different team retirements ===
Sometimes, if a player had been part of multiple franchises, both may elect to retire the number the player used per team. For example, Hank Aaron has the number 44 retired by both the Atlanta Braves and Milwaukee Brewers both because of his achievements and because he wore the same number for both teams.

In some cases, a team may retire a number in honor of a player that never played for them out of respect. Following Kobe Bryant's death in 2020, the Dallas Mavericks announced that number 24 would no longer be issued by the team (despite Bryant spending his entire career with the Lakers). While the number has not been issued since then, it is not honored in the rafters as an official retired number. Similarly, the New Orleans Pelicans retired number 7 in honor of Pete Maravich's basketball contributions to the state of Louisiana, during both his college career at Louisiana State University (LSU) and professional career with the city's former NBA team, the New Orleans Jazz. In addition, from their establishment in 2004, the Charlotte Bobcats did not issue number 13 out of respect to Bobby Phills, who played with the city's former NBA team, the Charlotte Hornets, who had already retired the number in 2000. In 2013, the New Orleans Hornets changed their name to the Pelicans. The following year, the Bobcats also re-branded, bringing the Hornets name back to Charlotte. Additionally, the original Charlotte Hornets' history from 1988 to 2002 was transferred to the renamed team. In 2014, the Pelicans returned the number to circulation, while the new Hornets had the number retired; it currently hangs from the rafters of the Spectrum Center. In the 2016–17 season, Cheick Diallo became the first Pelicans player to wear #13 after its reactivation.

=== League-wide retirements ===
Three players in the major North American sports leagues have had their numbers retired by all teams in their respective leagues, those being Jackie Robinson, the first Black player in the modern era of Major League Baseball, Wayne Gretzky, argued by many to be the greatest hockey player in NHL history, and Bill Russell, the most successful player in NBA history in terms of total championship wins.

Robinson had his number 42 retired league-wide in 1997. However, players who were wearing the number at the time were permitted to retain it for the duration of their careers, if they chose to do so. Mariano Rivera, the last remaining player to wear the number, retired at the end of the 2013 season. April 15 has been designated as Jackie Robinson Day to honor the anniversary of Robinson's MLB debut; on this day, all players, managers, coaches, and umpires wear 42.

Wayne Gretzky, who retired as the National Hockey League's all-time leader in goals, points, and assists, had his number 99 retired league-wide at the 2000 NHL All-Star Game. On August 11, 2022, the NBA announced that it would retire Bill Russell's number 6 jersey league-wide, allowing players already wearing the number to continue to do so.

== Association football ==
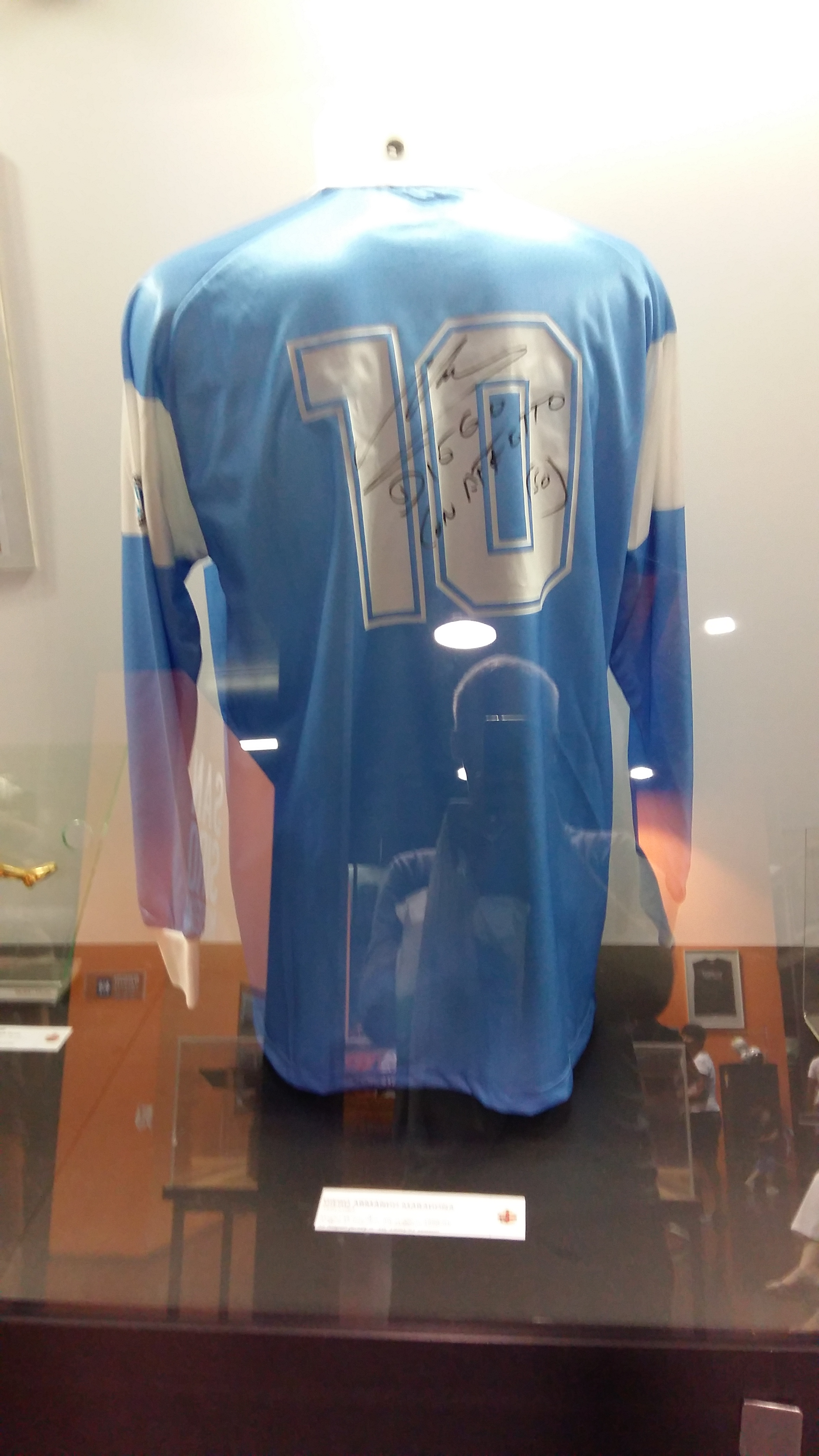
Football shirt worn by Diego Maradona in Italian club Napoli. The number 10 he wore was retired by Napoli in 2000

Association football has a far shorter history of players wearing squad numbers; from the introduction of numbers of shirts in the 1930s until the 1990s, the players on a team almost always wore numbers 1 to 11, irrespective of which players were selected. This meant that players often wore many different numbers during their time with a club and even during the same season, and were not as readily associated with a specific number as players in North American sports. Nonetheless, some star players were associated with a particular number and this, along with squad numbers becoming more common since the 1990s, has led some clubs to retire numbers.

AS Roma, AC Milan, Ajax, Birmingham City, Inter Milan, Napoli, Liverpool, Manchester City, Lens, Lyon, Nantes and Swansea City have all retired shirt numbers; Milan retiring Franco Baresi's #6 shirt and Paolo Maldini's #3 shirt (with the caveat that one of Maldini's sons can wear the shirt if they play professionally for the club). Swansea retired the shirt number of Besian Idrizaj after his death from a suspected heart attack. Manchester City, Lens and Lyon all retired the shirt number of Marc-Vivien Foé after his death on the field in the 2003 Confederations Cup. Liverpool retired the #20 shirt of Diogo Jota after his death in a car accident in July 2025.

FIFA have rejected all attempts by national teams to retire numbers due to its rules which included teams must be numbered consecutively in official competitions such as the World Cup. These include the Cameroon national team attempting to retire Foé's number, Argentina and the #10 of Diego Maradona, and The Netherlands and the #14 of Johan Cruyff.

== Australian rules football ==
In Australian rules football, some clubs may exercise the right to retire a particular guernsey number, either to honour a past player or to simply cease use of the number. Examples include the Hawthorn Football Club, who retired their No. 1 guernsey prior to the beginning of the 2011 AFL season as the tribute to the fans (it was later given to Harry Morrison in 2019), and the Collingwood Football Club, who retired their No. 42 guernsey in honour of Darren Millane, a Collingwood premiership player who was killed in a car crash in 1991.

== Motorsport ==
In NASCAR, only once has a number been unofficially retired; that is in the Whelen Modified Tour, where number 61 is retired for Richie Evans after his death in 1985. NASCAR unofficially retired the number 3 in honour of Dale Earnhardt Sr. after his death on the track at the 2001 Daytona 500. Following his death, Earnhardt's old team changed to the number 29, and the replacement driver (Kevin Harvick) drove the 29 car through the 2013 season. Dale Earnhardt Jr. made two special appearances in a number 3 car in the Busch Series in 2002 and again in the renamed Nationwide Series on 2 July 2010 at Daytona, but otherwise the number 3 was absent from all three national touring series until 2009, when Austin Dillon drove a number 3 in the Camping World Truck Series. Dillon is the grandson of Earnhardt's longtime friend and car owner Richard Childress, and he drives for Richard Childress Racing. After winning the Truck Series title in 2011, he drove the #3 car in the Nationwide Series in 2012 and 2013, and returned the number to the Cup Series in 2014 when he began competing full-time in that series for RCR. Ty Dillon, Austin's brother (another grandson of Childress), ran the number 3 in the Camping World Truck Series and began driving the number 3 in the Nationwide Series, now known as the O'Reilly Auto Parts Series, in 2014.

Richard Childress Racing announced it was suspending the use of the number 8 following the death of Kyle Busch in May 2026 until Kyle's son Brexton is able to take over (no sooner than 2033 under NASCAR's age minimum rules). They will instead use the number 33 for Kyle's team.

From 2004 to 2006, drivers in the International Race of Champions used their numbers from their primary racing series. However, the #3 was retired as a result of Earnhardt's death and any driver who drove the #3 in their primary racing series would drive #03 instead. As such, Hélio Castroneves, who drives #3 in the IndyCar Series, drove the #03.

Following the 1989 24 Hours of Daytona, months after his fatal plane crash, IMSA retired Al Holbert's #14.

CART retired the use of #99 after the fatal accident of Greg Moore in 1999. However, since the IndyCar Series unification took place in 2008, that recognition has since been abandoned. For a brief time during the early-mid 1990s, CART unofficially retired #14 (in honor of A. J. Foyt), allowing it only to be carried only by an entry of A. J. Foyt Enterprises. After the open wheel split in 1996, the rule in CART competition was lifted.

Grand Prix motorcycle racing retired the use of #34 for use in the premier class in honour of 1993 world champion Kevin Schwantz in 1995 upon his retirement. #74 after the fatal accident of Daijiro Kato in 2003, #48 after the fatal accident of Shoya Tomizawa in 2010, #58 after the accident of Marco Simoncelli at the Sepang Circuit in 2011, and #39 after the death of Luis Salom at the Circuit de Catalunya in 2016. In January 2019, #69 was retired in honour of Nicky Hayden, who died in a cycling accident in May 2017. In 2021 number 50 was retired in honour of Jason Dupasquier who was killed after an accident at the Mugello Circuit. In May 2022 at a ceremony before the Italian Grand Prix the #46 was retired in honour of nine time world champion & 115 time Grand Prix Winner Valentino Rossi who used the #46 throughout his career following his retirement in 2021. Additionally, no riders are allowed to use #1 as it is reserved for the defending champion, regardless of whether they use it or not.

The Formula One World Championship, which has allowed drivers to choose their own permanent number since the 2014 season, retired the use of #17 after the death of Jules Bianchi in 2015, caused by critical injuries sustained in a crash at the 2014 Japanese Grand Prix. Additionally, no drivers are allowed to use #1 as it is reserved for the defending champion, regardless of whether they use it or not. A driver's permanent number can only be reallocated two consecutive seasons after their last race.

The FIA Formula 2 Championship, formerly known as the GP2 Series, retired #19 after the death of Anthoine Hubert in a crash during the 2019 Spa-Francorchamps FIA Formula 2 round.

The FIA World Rally Championship, which has allowed drivers to choose their own number since the 2019, retired the use of #42 after the death of Craig Breen in 2023 during the test for 2023 Croatia Rally.

== Cricket ==
Australian Cricket retired Phillip Hughes' One-Day International shirt number, 64, in remembrance of him, after his death during a match in 2014.

In 2017, BCCI unofficially retired Sachin Tendulkar's One-Day International shirt number 10.

The Cricket Association of Nepal retired Paras Khadka's shirt number, 77, following the retirement of the country's most successful captain in August 2021.

== Rugby league ==
In other sports such as Rugby League and Rugby Union, despite the long history of the games, it used to be the case that because each number represents the particular positions on the field, the retirement of jersey numbers was impossible. However, as more leagues have gone over the use of squad numbers the retirement of numbers is now possible. The first recorded example in Rugby League was in May 2015 when Keighley Cougars withdrew number 6 following the death of Danny Jones during a match.

Following the death of former player Roger Millward, Hull Kingston Rovers withdrew the number 6 shirt Millward used to wear. Terry Campese who had been allocated that number for 2016 was allocated squad number 32 instead. In December 2024, Hull Kingston Rovers announced that the number 6 shirt had been 'unretired' for use by Steve Prescott MBE Man of Steel Mikey Lewis from the 2025 season onwards.

In 2014, the Newcastle Knights retired the number 16 jersey for every game from Round 4, following a career-ending neck injury to Alex McKinnon that left him a quadriplegic.

== Other sports ==
In Finnish ice hockey, if a player's number is retired, family members can use the retired number if they play for the same organization. Timo Nummelin had his number 3 retired by TPS, and later his son, Petteri Nummelin, wore number 3 for the team.

Following the death of Wouter Weylandt in the 2011 Giro d'Italia cycle race, organizers decided that they would not reassign Weylandt's bib number of 108 in future editions of the race.

In December 2020, following the death of professional wrestler Jon Huber, who wrestled under the ring name "Mr. Brodie Lee" in the American promotion All Elite Wrestling (AEW), the promotion retired the red strap version of the AEW TNT Championship belt that had been used up to that point in honor of Huber, who was the championship's second title holder; the belt was given to Huber's eldest son. A black strap version of the championship is now used.

In ceremonies before Germany's opening game of EuroBasket 2022 against France on September 2 in Cologne, the German Basketball Federation retired the #14 that Hall of Famer Dirk Nowitzki (Note: Nowitzki was formally inducted in his first year of eligibility in 2023.) had worn for the men's national team. Since then, a replica of Nowitzki's jersey has hung from the arena rafters at all Germany men's home games.

On June 3rd 2019, the Pleasant Valley High School held the Schyler Herman Memorial Soccer Game. The varsity goalkeeper's jersey and number, double zero (00), was retired, making her the last Pleasant Valley athlete to wear the number. Schyler Herman passed from ALL/AML Leukemia on October 31, 2018 at 10:47PM.

== Entertainment ==
In 2006, singer-songwriter Billy Joel became the first person outside sports to be awarded a retired number in the history of Madison Square Garden, New York. The number chosen (12) equalled the number of performances he gave there between January 23 and April 24, which broke the venue's record for the most consecutive sold-out concerts by an artist during the same tour (the previous best of 10 shows was set by Bruce Springsteen in 2000).

== See also ==
- List of Canadian Football League retired numbers
- List of Major League Baseball retired numbers
- List of NBA retired numbers
- List of NFL retired numbers
- List of National Hockey League retired numbers
- List of retired numbers in association football
- List of NCAA men's basketball retired numbers
- List of NCAA football retired numbers
