= O.J. Murdock =

American football player (1987–2012)

Profile
- Position: Wide receiver

Personal information
- Born: February 15, 1987
- Died: July 30, 2012 (aged 25); Tampa, Florida, U.S.
- Listed height: 5 ft 11 in (1.80 m)
- Listed weight: 200 lb (91 kg)

Career information
- High school: Tampa (FL) Middleton
- College: South Carolina (2005–2006); Pearl River CC (2007); Fort Hays State (2009–2010)
- NFL draft: 2011: undrafted

Career history
- Tennessee Titans (2011)

Awards and highlights
- 2× Second-team All-MIAA (2009, 2010)
- Stats at Pro Football Reference

Orenthal James Murdock (February 15, 1987 – July 30, 2012) was an American professional football wide receiver.

== Early life ==
Murdock, an alumnus of Middleton High School in Tampa, Florida, was known for his ability at track and field and football. He was ranked a 4 star recruit and the 11th best wide receiver in the country by 247Sports, whilst simultaneously winning a title in a state track and field final. He was expected to commit to Florida to play both sports, but chose South Carolina instead.

== College career ==
Murdock "redshirted" his first season at South Carolina. He then played just 4 games with 1 reception in the 2006 season before being arrested for shoplifting in Tampa, and being suspended indefinitely from the team.

Murdock then transferred to Pearl River Community College, but he broke his collarbone. He was then offered a scholarship from Marshall but he did not meet the academic requirements.

He then transferred to Fort Hays State in 2009. In his 2009 season, Murdock started and played 10 games and had 697 receiving yards, leading the team in multiple categories and earning a Second-team all MIAA honor.

== Professional career ==
Pre-draft measurables
Height	Weight	40-yard dash	20-yard shuttle	Vertical jump	Broad jump	Bench press
5 ft 10 in (1.78 m)	197 lb (89 kg)	4.50 s	4.37 s	34.5 in (0.88 m)	9 ft 8 in (2.95 m)	15 reps
All values from NFL Combine

On July 26, 2011, Murdock was signed as an undrafted free agent by the Tennessee Titans.

On July 31, 2011, Murdock tore his Achilles tendon, ending his season.

== Death ==
On July 30, 2012, Murdock was found in his car parked outside his former high school, Middleton High School, with self-inflicted gunshot wounds at 8:30 am. He was rushed to Tampa General Hospital where he died later that morning. Murdock had texted multiple former coaches before his suicide. Murdock had not appeared for training camp with his team, the Tennessee Titans, since June due to a personal issue, according to the Titans. Although Murdock was meant to appear on July 27, he reassured his head coach Mike Munchak that he would on July 29, though he never did.

His former college teammate Kenny McKinley also died from suicide less than 2 years earlier.

== See also ==
- List of gridiron football players who died during their careers
