= Ching Hammill =

American football player (1902–1925)

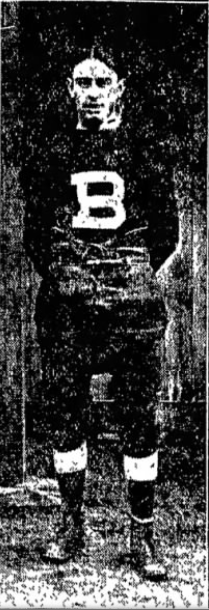
- Hammill in 1922

No. 19
- Position: Back

Personal information
- Born: September 28, 1902; Bridgeport, Connecticut, U.S.
- Died: November 25, 1925 (aged 23); Bridgeport, Connecticut, U.S.
- Listed height: 5 ft 7 in (1.70 m)
- Listed weight: 158 lb (72 kg)

Career information
- High school: Bridgeport (CT), Hebron (ME)
- College: Connecticut

Career history
- Bridgeport (1922–1924); Providence Steam Roller (1925); All-New Britain (1925)

Awards and highlights
- All-New England (1921)

Career statistics
- Games played: 1
- Games started: 1
- Stats at Pro Football Reference

James E. "Ching" Hammill III (September 28, 1902 – November 25, 1925) was an American football back. After playing college football for Connecticut, he played four seasons professionally, for a team in Bridgeport from 1922 to 1924, and both the Providence Steam Roller of the National Football League (NFL) and All-New Britain in 1925 before his death in November of that year.

== Early life and education ==
Hammill was born on September 28, 1902, in Bridgeport, Connecticut. He entered Bridgeport High School in 1917, making the varsity team as a freshman. He played end in his first season before being switched to the backfield in 1918 by coach Fred Hunt, who "saw Hammill's possibilities as a football player." His school won most of their games that year, with Hammill "running wild" in the majority of them. Following the season, Hammill was a unanimous selection for the all-state team. He was team captain as a junior in 1919, earning a second unanimous all-state selection. He transferred to Hebron Academy the following year, playing one season.

Though Hammill initially committed to Georgetown University, he changed his mind and instead enrolled at the University of Connecticut. After the season, he was named all-New England at the quarterback position. He left the school after just one year.

== Professional career ==
After leaving Connecticut, he signed a contract to play professional football with a team in Bridgeport. He scored the game-winning touchdown over a team called "Williams", which helped them head "straight for a state championship." A 1922 article in The Bridgeport Telegram said his "greatest feat on the gridiron this season was his 53 yard run back of a punt which he scored a touchdown." He returned to Bridgeport for the 1923 and 1924 seasons. Hammill made one of his longest career plays in 1924 against the "West Sides", scoring on a 65-yard rush.

In 1925, Hammill was signed by the Providence Steam Roller of the National Football League (NFL), making his debut against the Frankford Yellow Jackets on October 3, starting at the quarterback position. He and Cy Wentworth were described by The Philadelphia Inquirer as seeming to be "the only men in Providence's galaxy who could tear through Frankford's first and secondary defense for any sort of gains." The Steam Roller lost, 0–7.

In November 1925, he also played for All-New Britain of New Britain, Connecticut.

== Death ==
On November 25, 1925, less than two months after making his NFL debut, Hammill died of injuries suffered in an accident at his job. A report in The Journal said the following:

Details of the accident are meagre but from the scattered accounts pieced together by E. L. Fletcher, structural engineer of the American Tube and Stamping company, Hammill with another workman was on the roof of one of the buildings shortly before 9 o'clock this morning. He was seen to leave the roof, crawl through a window into an adjoining building where an electric crane traveled along elevated tracks. In some manner Hammill got on the tracks as the crane approached and was run down. There was only one eye witness to the accident and he collapsed as soon as he had aided in removing the mangled body of his co-worker from beneath the crane.

Both of his legs were amputated, but Hammill ultimately died of his injuries. A game was held in December between the Bridgeport High School basketball team and former alumni, with the earnings going to the benefit of his family.

A sportswriter in the Hartford Courant posthumously called him:

maybe the best player Connecticut ever had ... He could run, pass and kick. And what a tackler he was! He had as tricky a running style as I've ever seen on a football field and he had [a] football sense that was uncanny. He would be hemmed in by tacklers and somehow he would get away and keep running.

== See also ==
- List of gridiron football players who died during their careers
