= Marcus Cassel =

American football player (1983–2006)

Profile
- Position: Cornerback

Personal information
- Born: January 6, 1983; Long Beach, California, U.S.
- Died: November 17, 2006 (aged 23); Santa Monica, California, U.S.

Career information
- High school: Narbonne; St. John Bosco (Bellflower, CA)
- College: UCLA

Career history
- Carolina Panthers (2006)

Marcus Ray Cassel (January 6, 1983 – November 17, 2006) was an American football player, who played cornerback at UCLA. He died as a result of a car crash.

== Early life ==
Marcus Cassel was born on January 6, 1983, to Clyde and Joletta Cassel. He grew up with a younger brother, Jason. From an early age, he was active in the Boy Scouts. Cassel attended Long Beach Brethren Elementary School and Calvary Chapel Christian School of Downey before attending Narbonne High School. He later transferred to St. John Bosco High School in Bellflower, California. While at St. John Bosco, he was a standout cornerback, earning All-State and All-American honors, and graduating with a 3.5 GPA and a full football scholarship to UCLA. As a youth, he also played for the Orange County Junior All American Football Carson Colts, winning the 1997 Super Bowl championship.

== College and professional career ==
Cassel attended the University of California, Los Angeles (UCLA), where he played cornerback for the Bruins. He became a starting player during his junior and senior years. During the 2005 season, he recorded 16 tackles (14 solo) and two pass breakups in a game against the USC Trojans, earning Defensive Player of the Game honors alongside Reggie Bush. At the team's awards banquet, he was named UCLA's Most Improved Player. He graduated from UCLA in 2006 with a Bachelor of Arts in Psychology.

After college, Cassel signed a free agent contract with the Carolina Panthers on May 5, 2006. However, he suffered a hamstring injury during training camp and was released from the team four months later. He had planned to attend graduate school following his football career.

== Personal life, death, and legacy ==
Beyond football, Cassel was an avid writer and kept journals of his poetry, with pieces such as "I Am Thought" and "IF". He also briefly pursued acting and auditioned for a role in the 2001 film Baby Boy, but the part ultimately went to Tyrese Gibson.

Cassel died on November 17, 2006, in Santa Monica, California, as a result of a car crash.

Following his death, Cassel was honored at the December 2, 2006 rivalry game between UCLA and USC. A moment of silence was observed in his memory before the game, which UCLA subsequently won in a historic 13-9 upset over the #2 ranked Trojans.

His family and community established multiple scholarships in his memory, including the Marcus Cassel Memorial Scholarship at Central Baptist Church, a scholarship fund donated to UCLA, and the Marcus Cassel Perpetual Scholarship Fund at St. John Bosco High School. Support was also directed to the Carson Athletic Association's youth football program, where Cassel had played as a youth.

== See also ==
- List of gridiron football players who died during their careers
