= List of gridiron football players who died during their careers =

This is a list of players of gridiron football (American football and Canadian football) players who died while still on a team roster. Included are players in professional and college football who have died of any cause. For professional football players, the most common cause of death is vehicle crashes. For college players, the most common cause of death is in-game and practice injuries. Each player is listed with the team to which he was assigned at the time of his death, rather than the team with which he spent most of his career. Players who were free agents at the time of their death are not listed.

== National Football League ==
†	= Pro Bowler
‡	= Hall of Famer

=== 1920–1965 ===
Name	Age	Position	Team	Cause of death	Year	Reference(s)
Ralph Anderson	24	WR	Los Angeles Chargers (AFL)	Diabetic reaction	1960	
Jeff Burkett	26	WR / P	Chicago Cardinals	Plane crash	1947	
Ernie Davis	23	HB	Cleveland Browns	Leukemia	1963 (Note: Davis was under contract when he died, though he did not play in a game due to his illness)	
Terry Dillon	22	DB	Minnesota Vikings	Drowned	1964	
Bo Farrington	28	TE	Chicago Bears	Car crash (with Willie Galimore)	1964	
Don Fleming	25	S	Cleveland Browns	Accidental electrocution	1963	
Willie Galimore †	29	HB	Chicago Bears	Car crash (with Bo Farrington)	1964	
Howard Glenn	26	G	New York Titans (AFL)	Neck injury (in-game)	1960	
Ching Hammill	23	BB	Providence Steam Roller	Crushed by electric crane	1925	
Mack Lee Hill †	25	FB	Kansas City Chiefs (AFL)	Pulmonary embolism	1965	
Stone Johnson	23	HB	Kansas City Chiefs (AFL)	Neck injury (in-game)	1963 (Note: Johnson was injured in a pre-season game, and did not play in a regular season game.)	
Mose Kelsch	38	K	Pittsburgh Pirates	Car crash	1935	
Galen Laack	27	G	Philadelphia Eagles	Car crash	1958	
Bob Laraba	28	LB	San Diego Chargers (AFL)	Car crash	1962	
Gene Lipscomb †	31	DT	Pittsburgh Steelers	Drug overdose	1963	
Stan Mauldin	27	OT	Chicago Cardinals	Heart attack	1948	
Lucien Reeberg	21	OT	Detroit Lions	Heart attack	1964	
Dave Sparks	26	DT	Washington Redskins	Coronary thrombosis	1954	

=== 1966–1995 ===
Name	Age	Position	Team	Cause of death	Year
Jeff Alm	25	DT	Houston Oilers	Suicide	1993
Eric Andolsek	25	G	Detroit Lions	Car crash	1992
Troy Archer	24	DE	New York Giants	Car crash	1979
Brad Beckman	24	TE	Atlanta Falcons	Car crash	1989
Jerome Brown †	27	DT	Philadelphia Eagles	Car crash	1992
Frank Buncom †	29	LB	Cincinnati Bengals (AFL)	Blood clot	1969
J. V. Cain	28	TE	St. Louis Cardinals	Heart attack	1979
Rusty Chambers	27	LB	Miami Dolphins	Car crash	1981
Kirk Collins	25	CB	Los Angeles Rams	Esophageal cancer	1984
David Croudip	30	DB	Atlanta Falcons	Drug overdose	1988
Shane Curry	24	DE	Indianapolis Colts	Homicide	1992
Joe Delaney †	24	RB	Kansas City Chiefs	Drowned	1983
Jim Duncan	26	CB	Baltimore Colts	Suicide	1972
Randy Frisch	23	OT	Pittsburgh Steelers	Car crash	1977
Blenda Gay	26	DE	Philadelphia Eagles	Homicide	1976
Larry Gordon	28	LB	Miami Dolphins	Heart attack	1983
David Griggs	28	LB	San Diego Chargers	Car crash	1995
Roger Hagberg	31	TE	Oakland Raiders (AFL)	Car crash	1970
Chuck Hughes	28	WR	Detroit Lions	Cardiac arrest (in-game), compounded by spleen injury from a previous game	1971
Bruce McLenna	26	FB	Kansas City Chiefs (AFL)	Car crash	1968
Ralph Norwood	23	OT	Atlanta Falcons	Car crash	1989
David Overstreet	25	RB	Miami Dolphins	Car crash	1984
Brian Piccolo	26	HB	Chicago Bears	Embryonal cell carcinoma	1970
Ron Rector	24	HB	Atlanta Falcons	Motorcycle crash	1968
Don Rogers	23	S	Cleveland Browns	Heart attack	1986
Andy Spiva	24	LB	Atlanta Falcons	Car crash	1979
Stacey Toran	27	DB	Los Angeles Raiders	Car crash	1989
Fred Washington	23	DT	Chicago Bears	Car crash	1990
Dave Waymer †	34	S	Los Angeles Raiders	Heart attack	1993

=== 1996–2021 ===
Name	Age	Position	Team	Cause of death	Year
Gaines Adams	26	DE	Chicago Bears	Cardiac arrest	2010
Jovan Belcher	25	LB	Kansas City Chiefs	Suicide	2012
Leon Bender	22	DT	Oakland Raiders	Seizure	1998
Jerry Brown	25	LB	Dallas Cowboys	Car crash	2012
Brandon Burlsworth	22	G	Indianapolis Colts	Car crash	1999
Marcus Cassel	23	CB	Carolina Panthers	Car crash	2006
Marquis Cooper	26	LB	Oakland Raiders	Presumed dead from boating accident; body never found	2009
Rodney Culver	26	RB	San Diego Chargers	Plane crash	1996
Chris Henry	26	WR	Cincinnati Bengals	Fell out of back of a moving vehicle	2009
Thomas Herrion	23	G	San Francisco 49ers	Ischaemic heart disease	2005
Marquise Hill	24	DE	New England Patriots	Drowned	2007
Edwin Jackson	26	LB	Indianapolis Colts	Car crash	2018
Fred Lane	24	RB	Carolina Panthers	Homicide	2000
Kenny McKinley	23	WR	Denver Broncos	Suicide	2010
O.J. Murdock	25	WR	Tennessee Titans	Suicide	2012
Damien Nash	24	RB	Denver Broncos	Cardiac failure	2007
Corey Smith	29	DE	Detroit Lions	Presumed dead from boating accident, body never found	2009
Korey Stringer †	27	OT	Minnesota Vikings	Heat stroke	2001
Sean Taylor †	24	FS	Washington Redskins	Homicide	2007
Derrick Thomas ‡	33	LB	Kansas City Chiefs	Pulmonary embolism	2000
Eric Turner †	31	S	Oakland Raiders	Stomach cancer	2000
Tray Walker	23	CB	Baltimore Ravens	Motorcycle crash	2016
Darrent Williams	24	CB	Denver Broncos	Homicide	2007

=== 2022–present ===
Name	Age	Position	Team	Cause of death	Year
Jaylon Ferguson	26	LB, DE	Baltimore Ravens	Drug overdose	2022
Jeff Gladney	25	CB	Arizona Cardinals	Car crash	2022
Dwayne Haskins	24	QB	Pittsburgh Steelers	Hit by vehicle while walking	2022
Khyree Jackson	24	CB	Minnesota Vikings	Car crash	2024
Marshawn Kneeland	24	DE	Dallas Cowboys	Suicide	2025
Rondale Moore	25	WR	Minnesota Vikings	Suicide	2026

== Canadian Football League ==
†	= CFL All-Star
‡	= Hall of Famer

Name	Age	Position	Team	Cause of death	Year	Reference(s)
Ormond Beach ‡	27	FW/LB	Sarnia Imperials (ORFU)	Industrial accident	1938	
Mel Becket †	27	Center (gridiron football)/DE	Saskatchewan Roughriders	Plane crash	1956	
Norm Casola	29	SB	Toronto Argonauts	Cancer	1998	
Travis Claridge	27	OL	Hamilton Tiger-Cats	Pneumonia	2006	
Jayden Dalke	30	S/LB	Saskatchewan Roughriders	Car crash	2026	
Mario DeMarco †	32	OL/DE	Saskatchewan Roughriders	Plane crash	1956	
Allen Gallaher	26	OL	BC Lions	Heart attack	1977	
Mylan Hicks	23	DB	Calgary Stampeders	Homicide	2016	
Harry Hood	28	HB	Calgary Stampeders	Cancer	1954	
Jamaica Jackson	26	LB	Hamilton Tiger-Cats	Enlarged heart	2008	
Cal Jones †	23	G	Winnipeg Blue Bombers	Plane crash	1956	
Kevin Lapa	24	LB	BC Lions	Cancer	1985	
Joe McKnight	28	RB	Saskatchewan Roughriders	Homicide	2016	
Jeff Nicklin †	30	HB/FW/E	Winnipeg Blue Bombers	killed in action	1945	
Tom Pate	23	LB	Hamilton Tiger-Cats	Aneurysm (in game)	1975	
Ernie Pitts ‡	35	DB/WR	BC Lions	Homicide	1970	
Derrell Robertson	27	DE	Las Vegas Posse	Car crash	1994	
Adrian Robinson	25	LB	Hamilton Tiger-Cats	Suicide	2015	
Junior Robinson	27	CB	Memphis Mad Dogs	Car accident	1995	
Christian Saulsberry	25	WR	Edmonton Elks	Homicide	2022	
Gordon Sturtridge †	28	DE	Saskatchewan Roughriders	Plane crash	1956	
Dick Suderman †	31	DB	Edmonton Eskimos	Brain hemorrhage	1972	
Ray Syrnyk †	23	OL/DE	Saskatchewan Roughriders	Plane crash	1956	
Vernon Vaughn	25	OL	Saskatchewan Roughriders	Leukemia	1961	
Don Warrington	32	RB	Edmonton Eskimos	Car accident	1980	
Ted Watkins	27	WR	Hamilton Tiger-Cats	Shot while robbing a liquor store	1968	

== Minor league football and indoor football ==
Name	Age	Position	Team	Cause of death	Year	Reference(s)
Glen Hepburn	29	Two-way end	Omaha Mustangs (Continental Football League)	Injuries sustained during game vs Michigan Arrows	1968	
Donald Sellers	26	WR	Las Vegas Outlaws (XFL)	Car crash	2001	
Troy Stark	28	OL	New York/New Jersey Hitmen (XFL)	Complications from surgery	2001	
Julian Yearwood	31	FB/LB	Bakersfield Blitz (AF2)	Clogged arteries	2003	
Al Lucas	26	DT	Los Angeles Avengers (AFL)	In-game neck injury vs New York Dragons	2005	
Justin Skaggs	28	QB	Utah Blaze (AFL)	Stage III oligodendroglioma brain cancer	2007	
Johnathan Goddard	27	DE	Colorado Crush (AFL)	Motorcycle crash	2008	
Johnie Kirton	26	RB	San Jose SaberCats (AFL)	Methadone toxicity	2012	
Dave Coleman Jr.	32	Offensive lineman	Jay County Panthers	Injuries sustained during game vs Northwest Ohio Knights	2012	
Chandler Williams	27	WR	Tampa Bay Storm (AFL)	Cardiac arrest	2013	
Odin Lloyd	27	Linebacker	Boston Bandits (New England Football League)	Homicide	2013	
Kevin Graden	31	Offensive lineman	South Shore Chiefs (New England Football League)	Car crash	2014	
Deante Smith	25		Michigan Lightning	Homicide	2015	
Rodney Sledge	40		Petersburg Lions	Car crash	2016	
Barnard Flowers	20	Cornerback/Safety	Fort Dodge Hawks (Unified Football League)	Injuries sustained during game vs Omaha Outlaws	2016	
Shannon Martin	36	Inside linebacker	York Silver Bullets	Homicide	2016	
Timothy J. Golden	19	Tight end	Kansas Cougars	Homicide	2017	
Julio Ferrer	31	Defensive tackle	York Silver Bullets	Homicide	2017	
Shareif Simpson	25	Defensive back	Cumberland Valley Hitmen	Homicide	2019	
Eddie Ray Bailey Jr.	29		Leander Wolfpack	Homicide	2020	
Chris Brown	24	Offensive lineman	DC Defenders (XFL)	Drowned	2021	
Dave Post	22	Wide receiver	San Diego Silverbacks (Labelle Developmental Football League)	Hit by vehicle while changing tire	2022	
Devon Harris	25	Linebacker	Virginia Beach Rhinos	Homicide	2022	
Marquise Manns Jr.	30	Quarterback	Lansing Crusaders	Homicide	2022	
Jessie Lemonier	25	Linebacker	Birmingham Stallions (USFL)	Unknown	2023	
Deveall McClendon	25	Fullback/Defensive end	Minneapolis Warriors (HFA)	Homicide	2023	
Chris Smith	31	Defensive end	Seattle Sea Dragons (XFL)	Unknown	2023	
Alex Collins	28	Running back	Memphis Showboats (USFL)	Motorcycle accident	2023	
Jason Norfolk	32		Utica Yard Dogs (EFL)	Snowmobile accident	2023	
Xavier Townsend-Keith	23	Tight end	KC Legion	Homicide	2024	
Diondre Overton	26	Wide receiver	Memphis Showboats (UFL)	Homicide	2024	
Davian Andrew Pallotto	22	Running back	Tri-State Bruins (East Coast Football League)	Car crash	2024	
Zachary Bautz	28	Running back	New Jersey Eagles (NEAFL)	Car crash	2024	
Zachary Lucas	40	Center	Coralville Chaos (AIF)	Homicide	2025	
Jaylon Abdul-Karim	28	Defensive End	Iowa Woo (The AL/TAL)	Unknown	2025	
Chris Payton-Jones	30	Cornerback	St. Louis Battlehawks (UFL)	Car crash	2026	

== College ==
Player	Age	School	Position	Cause of death	Year	Reference(s)
Bennie Abram III	20	Mississippi	Safety	Exercise collapse associated with sickle cell trait	2010	
Brandon Adams	21	Georgia Tech	Nose tackle	Collapsed and hit head while dancing	2019	
Corey Adams	18	Mississippi	Defensive end	Homicide	2025	
Ted Agu	21	California	Defensive end	Exercise collapse associated with sickle cell trait	2014	
John Airhart	19	Simmons	Quarterback	Traumatic brain injury sustained during 1909 game vs. Howard Payne	1910	
John Albert		Chicago	Multiple	Stomach ailment	1914	
Mason Alexander	18	Pittsburgh	Cornerback	Car crash	2025	
John Allen	24	Christian Brothers	Tackle	Traumatic brain injury sustained during game vs. Saint Louis alumni team	1899	
Kyle Ambrogi	21	Penn	Running back	Suicide	2005	
Avery Atkins	20	Florida	Cornerback	Ecstasy overdose	2007	
Sal Aunese	21	Colorado	Quarterback	Stomach cancer	1989	
Walter Back	22	Oregon		Blood poisoning	1935	
George T. Bahen	21	Georgetown	Halfback	Spinal cord injury sustained during 1894 game vs. Columbia Athletic Club	1895	
Marlin Barnes	22	Miami (FL)	Linebacker	Homicide	1996	
MicahJo Barnett	20	William Jewell	Running back	Medical emergency	2026	
Charles Beccara		Lehigh	Guard	Accidental self-inflicted gunshot	1895	
Bryce Beekman	22	Washington State	Cornerback	Acute intoxication after consuming fentanyl and promethazine	2020	
Verner Belyea		Norwich	Halfback	Spinal cord injury sustained during game vs. Holy Cross	1913	
Heath Benedict	24	Newberry	Offensive tackle	Enlarged heart	2008	
Brook Berringer	22	Nebraska	Quarterback	Plane crash	1996	
Preston Birdsong	19	Tennessee Tech	Defensive back	Exercise collapse associated with sickle cell trait	2000	
Kaleb Boateng	21	Florida	Offensive lineman	Suicide	2023	
Edward Bohn	22	Missouri Mines	Halfback	Spinal cord injury sustained during game vs. Central Missouri	1920	
Jesse Boshears	20	Arkansas Tech	Offensive lineman	COVID-19	2022	
Joseph Boutros	21	Salve Regina	Offensive lineman	Accidental carbon monoxide poisoning	2026	
Austin Box	22	Oklahoma	Linebacker	Accidental opioid overdose	2011	
Tajh Boyd	19	Liberty	Offensive lineman	Suicide	2023	
Kelvin Broadhurst Jr.	20	North Carolina A&T	Defensive lineman	Motorcycle crash	2026	
Cary Brown		Presbyterian	End	Spinal cord injury sustained during practice	1923	
Hunter Brown	21	Air Force Academy	Offensive lineman	Blood clot in lungs following an injury suffered in practice	2023	
Michael Burke	21	Medico-Chirurgical	Tackle	Traumatic brain injury sustained during game vs. Philadelphia Pharmacy	1909	
Medrick Burnett Jr.	20	Alabama A&M	Linebacker	Serious injury after a head-on collision during game vs. Alabama State	2024	
Eugene Byrne	21	Army	Tackle	Traumatic brain and spinal cord injury sustained during game vs. Harvard	1909	
Derringer Cade	20	Northeast Missouri State	Linebacker	Idiopathic hypertropic cardiomyopathy sustained during game vs. Southwest Baptist	1990	
Ronnie Caldwell	21	Northwestern State	Safety	Homicide	2023	
Leon Carey	20	Arkansas A&M		Cerebral hemorrhage	1931	
Devin Chandler	20	Virginia	Wide receiver	Homicide	2022	
Archer Christian	18	Virginia	Halfback	Traumatic brain injury sustained during game vs. Georgetown	1909	
Ben Christman	21	UNLV	Offensive lineman	Heart disease and an irregular heartbeat	2025	
Ladarius Clardy	18	Kennesaw State	Quarterback	Homicide	2021	
Leonard Clarkson	23	Norwich	End	Internal injuries sustained during game vs. Dartmouth	1907	
Jackson Coker	18	Columbia	Wide receiver	Automobile accident	2021	
Hiram Cole	19	Central Methodist		Traumatic brain injury sustained during game vs. Missouri Military	1916	
Jeremiah Collins	18	Austin Peay	Cornerback	Car crash	2023	
Emanuell Cooks	18	Mississippi Delta	Offensive lineman	Medical complications following game vs. Hinds	2025	
John Cooper		North Carolina		Spinal cord injury sustained during practice	1908	
E.L. Cowden		Eastman		Internal injuries sustained during game vs. Poughkeepsie HS	1899	
Tylee Craft	23	North Carolina	Wide receiver	Stage 4 large cell neuroendocrine carcinoma	2024	
Tony Crane	20	Wilmington (OH)	Offensive lineman	Homicide	2025	
John Crumbacher		Tennessee	Offensive tackle	Car crash	1966	
John Curley	20	Trinity College (IA)		Unknown	1924	
Carl Dahlbeck	25	Purdue	Guard	Burn injury	1936	
Mario Danelo	21	USC	Kicker	Fell from a cliff	2007	
Marcus "MJ" Daniels Jr.	21	Southern Miss	Cornerback	Homicide	2024	
Devaughn Darling	18	Florida State	Linebacker	Exercise collapse associated with sickle cell trait	2001	
Donald Davis		Emporia State	Halfback	Internal injuries sustained during game vs. Baker	1921	
Lavel Davis Jr.	21	Virginia	Wide receiver	Homicide	2022	
William Davis	22	Sam Houston	Defensive back	Unknown	2026	
Calvin "CJ" Dickey Jr.	18	Bucknell	Defensive lineman	Sickle cell trait	2024	
Marcus Dickey	22	Mississippi Gulf Coast	Defensive lineman	Car crash	2025	
Ernest Dickson	21	Arkansas	Halfback	Pneumonia	1908	
Ovid Donaldson		McMurry	End	Spinal cord injury sustained diving into a swimming pool	1927	
Aaron Douglas	21	Alabama	Offensive lineman	Accidental overdose	2011	
Gardner Dow	21	Connecticut	Center	Traumatic brain injury sustained during game vs. New Hampshire	1919	
Butch Duhe	20	LSU	Quarterback	Congenital heart defect	1970	
Danny Duray	20	Southeast Missouri State	Placekicker	Unknown	2026	
W.L. Egan		Northwestern Oklahoma State	Halfback	Traumatic brain injury	1910	
Jake Ehlinger	20	Texas	Linebacker	Accidental overdose	2021	
Richard Evans		Wooster	Halfback	Spinal cord injury sustained during game vs. Western Reserve	1907	
Thomas Evans		Utah State	Guard	Spinal cord injury sustained during game vs. Colorado Mines	1908	
James Fenton	21	Holy Cross	Tackle	Spinal cord injury sustained during practice	1928	
G. Cook Ferebee	19	VMI	Halfback	Traumatic brain injury sustained during game vs. Roanoke	1908	
Oliver Ferry		Alfred		Internal injuries sustained during 1920 game vs. Allegheny	1921	
Tom Fisher		Tennessee	Linebacker	Car crash	1966	
Lorvens Florestal	19	Charleston Southern	Defensive end	Homicide	2021	
David Forney	22	Navy	Offensive lineman	Cardiac arrest	2020	
Alex Foster	18	Baylor	Defensive lineman	Homicide	2025	
Miles Fox	19	Navy	Running back	Sunstroke sustained during practice	1928	
Richard Von Albade Gammon	17	Georgia	Fullback	Traumatic brain injury sustained during game vs. Virginia	1897	
E. Herbert Garrison	22	Dickinson	End	Traumatic brain injury sustained during game vs. Swarthmore	1886	
Clayton Geib	21	Wooster	Offensive guard	Cerebral edema following game vs. Ohio Wesleyan	2017	
George Gipp	25	Notre Dame	Multiple	Strep throat infection and pneumonia	1920	
Eric Goll	20	Chadron State	Defensive lineman	Exercise collapse associated with sickle cell trait	2016	
Harry Goodloe	20	Central (KY)		Internal injuries sustained during game vs. Kentucky	1894	
Leo Goodreau	19	Villanova	Quarterback	Spinal cord injury sustained during practice	1928	
Robert Grays	19	Midwestern State	Defensive back	Spinal cord injury sustained during game vs. Texas A&M–Kingsville	2017	
Reuben Gretschow	23	Elmhurst	Tackle	Spinal cord injury sustained during game vs. Valparaiso	1931	
Lewis Grisler	21	Ohio Wesleyan	End	Heart failure sustained during practice	1906	
Theodore Hammonds	23	Warner	Wide receiver	Exercise collapse	2019	
William Hardrick	22	Austin Peay	Defensive back	Car crash	2025	
Jyilek Harrington	21	West Virginia State	Inside linebacker	Homicide	2024	
Jack Hartsock	17	Ohio Wesleyan		Unknown	1935	
Tyler Heintz	19	Kent State	Offensive lineman	Exertional heat stroke following conditioning drills	2017	
Tyler Hilinski	21	Washington State	Quarterback	Suicide	2018	
Edwin Hill	25	NYU	Halfback	Accidental gunshot	1929	
Henry Hooper	20	Dartmouth	Center	Complications from appendicitis surgery	1904	
Charles Hope		Corning Free Academy		Injuries received during a game	1903	
Tyler Horst	22	Bloomsburg	Fullback	Injuries sustained in a motor vehicle accident	2021	
Jasper Howard	20	Connecticut	Cornerback	Homicide (stabbed)	2009	
Terrance Howard	19	Alabama / North Carolina Central	Defensive back	Car crash	2024	
Jaden Hullaby	21	New Mexico	Halfback/Tight end	Unknown	2023	
Solomon Jackson	20	Buffalo	Defensive end	Collapsed during off-season workout	2016	
James Jamieson		Cornell	Quarterback	Typhoid fever	1907	
Tommy Johnson	24	Kansas	Quarterback	Kidney failure related to injury sustained during game vs. Missouri	1911	
Harry Jordan	19	Sioux Falls	Running back	Spinal cord injury sustained during game vs. South Dakota	1902	
Ty Jordan	19	Utah	Running back	Accidental gunshot	2020	
Kosta Karageorge	22	Ohio State	Defensive lineman	Suicide	2014	
Ryan Keeler	20	UNLV	Defensive lineman	Hypertrophic cardiomyopathy	2023	
Jeremiah Kelly	18	Cincinnati	Offensive lineman	Cardiac hypertrophy	2025	
Harry Knight		Drexel	Fullback	Crushed skull during practice game against Penn	1894	
Luke Knox	22	FIU	Linebacker/Tight end	Unknown	2022	
Mariushi Kuwamoto	28	Hawaii	Halfback	Traumatic brain injury sustained during game vs. Kamehameha School	1917	
Kyren Lacy	24	LSU	Wide receiver	Suicide	2025	
Charles Lange	19	Montana State		Spinal cord injury sustained during practice	1911	
Myzelle Law	19	MidAmerica Nazarene	Defensive lineman	Heat-related injuries at practice	2023	
Robert Layfield	18	Johns Hopkins	Quarterback	Spinal cord injury sustained during 1914 game vs. Lehigh	1915	
Robert Lewin		Baltimore Medical	Guard	Heart failure during game vs. Navy	1903	
Dale Lloyd II	19	Rice	Defensive back	Exercise collapse associated with sickle cell trait	2006	
James Edward "Jimmy" Long		Tennessee JC	Tailback	Ruptured blood vessel in the brain sustained during a game at Northwest Mississippi	1935	
Aaron Lowe	21	Utah	Cornerback	Homicide	2021	
Lyons		Washington & Jefferson		Injuries received during a game	1892	
Levi Madison	19	Mississippi Gulf Coast	Defensive lineman	Car crash	2021	
Mafatini Taimane-Laititi Mafatini	18	Snow	Offensive lineman	Car crash	2021	
Keith Marco	21	Cal Poly	Offensive lineman	Pulmonary embolism	2024	
Teigan Martin	20	South Florida	Tight end	Car crash	2024	
Justin McAllister	19	Sacramento City	Offensive tackle	Heart failure	2023	
Ralph McClure	21	Colorado College	Back	Spinal cord injury sustained during game vs. Colorado	1932	
Tom McGannon	20	Purdue	Halfback	Burn injury	1936	
Todric McGee	21	Missouri State	Safety	Accidental Shooting	2025	
Will McKamey	19	Navy	Running back	Collapsed during practice	2014	
Robert McKee		Alma	Tackle	Internal injuries sustained during game vs. Detroit Athletic Club	1901	
Tay McKibbins	18	Georgia Southern	Offensive lineman	Cancer	2025	
Gordon McMillan	21	West Virginia	Quarterback	Pneumonia	1924	
Jordan McNair	19	Maryland	Offensive lineman	Liver failure (caused by heatstroke)	2018	
Camdan McWright	18	San Jose State	Running back	Traffic collision (hit by a school bus while riding an electric scooter)	2022	
Wayne Merrifield	21	Michigan State Normal		Internal injuries	1931	
Walter Merryman	22	Davis & Elkins	Halfback	Traumatic brain injury sustained during game vs. Western Maryland	1911	
Keith Miller III	23	Texas A&M–Commerce	Wide receiver	Unknown	2024	
Darius Minor	18	Maine	Defensive back	Aortic dissection	2018	
Jakell Mitchell	18	Auburn	Tight end/Halfback	Homicide	2014	
James Mock	19	Roanoke		Pneumonia (caused by internal injuries sustained during practice)	1910	
Rudolph Monk	29	West Virginia	Halfback	Traumatic brain injury sustained during game vs. Bethany College (WV)	1910	
Howard Montgomery	21	Hampden–Sydney	Tackle	Spinal cord injury sustained during practice	1905	
Harold P. Moore	19	Union (NY)	Halfback	Traumatic brain injury sustained during game vs. NYU	1905	
Ed Morrissey	21	St. Ambrose		Pneumonia and blood poisoning	1913	
Anthony Mostella	22	South Alabama	Running back	Motorcycle crash	2010	
Chucky Mullins	21	Mississippi	Defensive back	Spinal cord injury sustained during 1989 game vs. Vanderbilt	1991	
Cornelius Murphy	21	Fordham	Tackle	Traumatic brain injury sustained during game vs. Bucknell	1931	
John "Jack" Murphy	23	Appalachian State	Offensive lineman	Unknown	2024	
Aaron O'Neal	19	Missouri	Linebacker	Exercise collapse associated with sickle cell trait	2005	
Edgar Newschwander		Ripon	Tackle	Spinal cord injury sustained during game vs. Northwestern College (WI)	1900	
James Nichols		Alabama	Center	Spinal injury	1931	
James Gamble Nippert	23	Cincinnati	Center	Blood poisoning contracted during game vs. Miami (OH)	1923	
Virgil Noland	21	Oregon	Guard	Burn injury	1911	
Edison Ogrosky	20	Southwestern (KS)	Fullback	Internal injuries sustained during game vs. Bethany (KS)	1924	
James E. Owens Jr.	20	Huntingdon	Defensive end	Car crash	2025	
Bryan Pata	22	Miami (FL)	Defensive lineman	Homicide	2006	
Ivan Perkins	21	New Mexico Normal		Traumatic brain injury sustained during practice	1937	
D'Sean Perry	20	Virginia	Linebacker	Homicide	2022	
Charles Persland		Pennsylvania Military		Traumatic brain injury	1917	
John Peters		Morningside		Internal injuries sustained during practice	1909	
Lawrence Pierson		Lake Forest	Halfback	Spinal cord injury sustained during game vs. South Division High School	1900	
Ereck Plancher	19	Central Florida	Wide receiver	Exercise collapse associated with sickle cell trait	2008	
Polie Poitier	19	Colorado	Defensive back	Exercise collapse associated with sickle cell trait	1974	
Dominiq Ponder	23	Colorado	Quarterback	Car crash	2026	
Alfred Primm, Jr.		Amherst	Halfback	Spinal cord injury sustained during practice	1926	
Charles Prior		Lehigh	Quarterback	Spinal cord injury sustained during game vs. West Virginia Wesleyan	1925	
Ryan Quinney	20	Mississippi Valley State	Linebacker	Car crash	2024	
Jack Reeves	23	Emporia State	Fullback	Spinal cord injury sustained during game vs. Washburn	1920	
Paul Reyna	19	Boise State	Defensive tackle	Traumatic brain injury sustained during scrimmage	1999	
Paul Root		Eastern Illinois	Halfback	Traumatic brain injury sustained during game vs. Illinois State	1915	
Joe Roth	21	California	Quarterback	Melanoma	1977	
Reed Ryan	22	Minnesota Duluth	Defensive lineman	Genetic heart condition	2023	
Hugh Saussy	18	City College of New York	Guard	Traumatic brain injury and spinal cord injury sustained during game vs. Elizabeth Athletic Club	1893	
Bryan Scott		Knox		Spinal cord injury sustained during game vs. Saint Louis	1915	
John Segrist	27	Ohio State	Center-rush	Spinal cord injury sustained during game vs. Western Reserve	1901	
Andre Seldon Jr.	22	Utah State	Cornerback	Drowning	2024	
Bertrand F. Serf	18	Doane	Quarterback	Traumatic brain injury sustained during game vs. Kansas	1896	
Ron Settles	21	Long Beach State	Running back	Found hanging in jail cell	1981	
Frank Shanklin	21	Hanover	End	Internal injuries sustained during practice	1903	
Derek Sheely	22	Frostburg State	Fullback	Traumatic brain injury sustained during practice	2011	
Richard Sheridan, Jr.	26	Army	End	Spinal cord injury sustained during game vs. Yale	1931	
AJ Simon	25	Albany	Defensive end	Sudden cardiac death	2024	
Matt Sklom	18	Ferris State	Linebacker	Collapse during practice	2002	
Ja'Quayvin Smalls	20	Western Carolina	Defensive back	Exercise collapse associated with sickle cell trait	2009	
C. D. Smith	22	Millsaps	Tackle	Spinal cord injury sustained during game vs. Stetson	1931	
Denali Smith	20	Graceland	Defensive lineman	Unknown	2024	
Nic Smith	20	Kentucky	Defensive lineman	Unknown	2026	
Wayne Souza	20	Wisconsin	Flanker	Drowned while swimming in Lake Monona	1979	
Joe Spybuck	19	Haskell	Tackle	Traumatic brain injury sustained during practice game	1909	
Bryce Stanfield	21	Furman	Defensive tackle	Pulmonary embolism following a sudden medical emergency during a football workout	2024	
Freddie Joe Steinmark	22	Texas	Safety	Osteosarcoma	1971	
Jamain Stephens	20	California (PA)	Defensive lineman	Blood clot in heart	2020	
Rodney Stowers	20	Mississippi State	Nose guard	Lung haemorrhage due to broken leg injury sustained vs Florida	1991	
Lee St. Hilaire	20	Husson	Quarterback	Suicide	2004	
Parker Sutherland	18	Northern Iowa	Tight end	Collapsed during an offseason workout	2026	
Izaiah Taylor	21	Georgia Military	Offensive lineman	House fire	2025	
Altee Tenpenny	20	Alabama / Nicholls	Running back	Car crash	2015	
Owen Thomas	21	Penn	Offensive lineman	Suicide	2010	
Jack Trice	21	Iowa State	Tackle	Internal injuries sustained during game vs. Minnesota	1923	
Frank Trimble		Indiana	Tackle	Blood poisoning	1909	
Tyler Ulrich	21	Southern Nazarene University	Safety	Traumatic in-game injury	2026	
Sione Veikoso	22	BYU	Offensive lineman	Construction accident	2022	
Brian Alan Wagner	19	Emporia State	Linebacker	Homicide (Traumatic Brain Injury from physical assault)	1999	
Ethan Walker	20	Iowa Central	Offensive lineman	Unknown	2026	
Kevon Walker	18	Saint Francis (PA)	Defensive lineman	Unknown	2024	
Joseph Walsh		St. Mary's (KS)	Guard	Spinal cord injury sustained during practice	1909	
George Watkinson	22	Yale	Halfback	"Over-exertion and exposure" sustained during game vs. Princeton	1886	
Spencer Webb	22	Oregon	Tight end	Head injury from cliff diving	2022	
Nolan Wells	18	Southwest Mississippi CC	Wide receiver	Unknown	2026	
Sam Westmoreland	18	Mississippi State	Offensive lineman	Suicide	2022	
Rashidi Wheeler	22	Northwestern	Safety	Exercise collapse associated with bronchial asthma	2001	
Nate White	20	South Dakota State	Running back	Medical event disrupting his breathing and heart function	2025	
Jordan Wiggins	18	Georgia Southern	Offensive lineman	Suicide	2019	
Quandarius Wilburn	18	Virginia Union	Defensive end	Suffering an acute sickle cell crisis during practice	2021	
Chad Wiley	22	North Carolina A&T	Offensive lineman	Exercise collapse associated with sickle cell trait	2008	
Curtis Williams	24	Washington	Safety	Spinal cord injury sustained during 2000 game vs. Stanford	2002	
Tirrell Williams	19	Fort Scott	Defensive tackle	Heat stroke during practice	2021	
Devin Willock	21	Georgia	Offensive lineman	Car crash	2023	
Earl Wilson		Navy	Quarterback	Spinal cord injury sustained during 1909 game vs. Villanova	1910	
Ralph Wilson	18	Wabash	Halfback	Traumatic brain injury sustained during game vs. Saint Louis	1910	
Willis Wilson	21	Hawaii	Running back	Drowned	2013	
Khambrail Winters	20	Texas State	Defensive back	Homicide	2020	
John Withnell		Saint Louis	Quarterback	Internal injuries sustained during practice	1903	
Homer Wray		Gettysburg		Internal injuries sustained during a practice game	1913	
Clark Yarbrough	21	Ouachita Baptist	Defensive lineman	Suffering a seizure	2022	
Gavin Yates-Lyons	18	Ball State	Defensive back	Homicide	2026	
Ted York	20	Yale	Guard	Pneumonia	1912	
John Zola	20	Lebanon Valley	Halfback	Collapsed during game vs. Drexel	1961	

== Team vehicle and plane crashes ==
- Purdue: 14 members of football team were killed in a railroad collision (1903).
- Cal Poly: 16 players and 6 others died in an airplane crash (1960).
- Northeastern Oklahoma A&M: 5 football players were killed in a head-on highway crash (1966).
- Wichita State: most of the starting players and coaches, 31 in total, died in an airplane crash (1970).
- Marshall: 37 members died in an airplane crash (1970).
- Southwestern Oklahoma State: 4 football players were killed in a car crash (1996).

== See also ==
- Sudden cardiac death of athletes
- List of National Football League players who died in wars
