= Ralph Norwood =

American football player (1966–1989)

No. 73
- Position: Offensive tackle

Personal information
- Born: January 23, 1966; New Orleans, Louisiana, U.S.
- Died: November 24, 1989 (aged 23); Atlanta, Georgia, U.S.
- Listed height: 6 ft 7 in (2.01 m)
- Listed weight: 285 lb (129 kg)

Career information
- High school: O. Perry Walker (New Orleans, Louisiana)
- College: LSU
- NFL draft: 1989: 2nd round, 38th overall pick

Career history
- Atlanta Falcons (1989)

Career NFL statistics
- Games played: 11
- Games started: 1
- Stats at Pro Football Reference

Ralph E. Norwood (January 23, 1966 – November 24, 1989) was an American professional football offensive tackle in the National Football League (NFL). He played 11 games with the Atlanta Falcons in 1989. He was killed in an automobile accident.

Norwood was born in New Orleans, Louisiana to Roy and Elaine Norwood. Norwood was a talented football player, standing 6 ft 7in tall and weighing over 200 lbs in high school, he was formidable on the line. After graduation, he attended LSU and was redshirted his freshman year. He was selected by the Atlanta Falcons in the second round of the 1989 NFL draft. Norwood died in a one-car accident on November 24, 1989. Norwood was alone in his car when he crossed over a lane of oncoming traffic, traveled down an embankment and struck a tree. Drugs and alcohol were not found to be factors in the accident. Norwood died eleven games into the 1989 season; he had played in each game and started one game.

The year before Norwood's death, Falcons cornerback David Croudip died of a cocaine overdose. After Norwood's death, Falcons player Mike Kenn commented on the two losses, saying, "There's not a whole lot you can say about this. Once is too much, twice is ridiculous." Less than four weeks after Norwood's accident, Falcons tight end Brad Beckman died when he apparently fell asleep while driving on any icy highway, striking a tree.

== See also ==
- List of gridiron football players who died during their careers
