= Howard Glenn =

American gridiron football player (1934–1960)

No. 66
- Position: Offensive guard

Personal information
- Born: September 26, 1934; Vancouver, Washington, U.S.
- Died: October 9, 1960 (aged 26); Houston, Texas, U.S.

Career information
- College: Linfield College

Career history
- 1959: CFL Hamilton Tiger-Cats
- 1960: AFL New York Titans

Career statistics
- Seasons: 1
- Games: 4
- Games Started: 0
- Stats at Pro Football Reference

Howard Earl Glenn (September 26, 1934 – October 9, 1960) was an American gridiron football player. He played collegiately at Linfield College and professionally with the Hamilton Tiger-Cats of the Canadian Football League (CFL) and in the American Football League (AFL). He was the only AFL player to die from injuries sustained in a regular season football game.

Glenn was born in Vancouver, Washington, and played high school football in Louisville, Mississippi. At Linfield College in McMinnville, Oregon, he played tight end and in 1956 caught a 75-yard touchdown pass. He was named to the all-Northwest Conference team in 1957.

In 1960, the AFL's inaugural season, Glenn joined the AFL New York Titans as an offensive guard. Glenn sustained a broken neck in the first half during a game vs. the Houston Oilers on October 9, 1960, at Jeppesen Stadium and died later that day.

== See also ==
- List of gridiron football players who died during their careers
