= Wayne Souza =

American football player (1958–1979)

- Running back Wayne Souza takes a handoff

No. 6
- Positions: Receiver and kick off returns

Personal information
- Born: June 10, 1958; New Bedford, Massachusetts, U.S.
- Died: July 21, 1979 (aged 21); Madison, Wisconsin, U.S.
- Listed height: 6 ft 2 in (1.88 m)
- Listed weight: 187 lb (85 kg)

Career information
- High school: New Bedford High School
- College: Wisconsin Badgers

Awards and highlights
- Two way starter; Two time letter winner

Wayne Souza (June 10, 1958 – July 21, 1979) was an American football player. He grew up in New Bedford, Massachusetts, where he was a standout football player at New Bedford High School. He was a quarterback and a halfback. Souza was also a standout track athlete. He went on to play football for the division one Wisconsin Badgers. Souza was a two way starter, his sophomore year he played defensive back in nine games. In his junior year, Souza was on offense as a receiver: he caught 24 passes for 323 yards and three touchdowns.

== Career ==
While still in high school Souza was recruited by Tulane University and the University of Wisconsin. Souza eventually decided to go to Wisconsin, and he was recruited to play Free Safety on defense. By his Junior year he was playing more and contributing. He played on offense as a wide receiver and a running back.

Souza's stats for the Wisconsin Badgers 1979 season
	Rushing				Receiving				Kick off returns				2 point
YEAR	ATT	YDS	AVG	TD	NO.	YDS	AVG	TD	YDS	AVG	TD	Att	Conv
1979	16	57	3.5	4	24	323	13.4	0	8	159	19.8	1	1
Totals	16	57	3.5	4	24	323	13.4	0	8	159	19.8	1	1

Souza was a two way starter who died prior to entering his senior year. He was also a two time letter winner for the Wisconsin Badgers.

== Personal ==
His parents were John and Madelyn Souza. He had one brother and two sisters.

== Death ==
Souza and a friend went boating on Lake Monona, near Madison, Wisconsin, on a hot day on July 21, 1979. Souza decided to go swimming and he drowned. It was thought that he suffered a cramp. His body was not found until the next day. He was buried in New Bedford, Massachusetts. The University of Wisconsin football team has since instituted an annual team award honoring Souza and Jay Seiler who died during spring practice in the same year. The awards are the Jay Seiler Coaches Appreciation Award (defense) and the Wayne Souza Coaches Appreciation Award (offense).

== See also ==
- List of gridiron football players who died during their careers
