= Marlin Barnes =

American football player (1974–1996)

Miami Hurricanes
- Position: Linebacker

Personal information
- Born: April 6, 1974
- Died: April 13, 1996 (aged 22); Coral Gables, Florida
- Listed weight: 220 lb (100 kg)

Career information
- College: Miami (1995)

Marlin Adarryl Barnes (April 6, 1974 – April 13, 1996) was a linebacker for the University of Miami Hurricanes. He was found brutally beaten to death in his apartment in 1996, along with his longtime friend, Timwanika Lumpkins. Barnes was a six-foot, 220-pound linebacker who played second string for the Hurricanes. Barnes and linebacker Ray Lewis, who later won two Super Bowls with the Baltimore Ravens, were teammates and roommates at the University of Miami.

== Murder ==
On the morning of April 13, 1996, Barnes' body was discovered when his roommate Earl Little came home to pick up the keys to his truck. Little found that someone had slashed two of the tires on his truck, and when he attempted to open the door to the apartment, he noticed that there was something obstructing the door. When Earl looked through an opening in the door, he saw Barnes' body slumped against the door with a pool of blood surrounding him. Barnes was severely injured and had nearly lost his entire face in what appeared to be a brutal beating, and was close to death when Little found him. By the time the police arrived, Barnes was already dead. It was discovered that Barnes had been beaten to death with a blunt object. After a thorough search of the rest of the apartment, police found the beaten and broken, yet alive, body of Barnes' longtime friend, Timwanika Lumpkins, pinned between the bed and the wall. She later died in the hospital.

== Investigation ==
After seventeen days of investigation, it was concluded that Lumpkins' ex-boyfriend Labrant Dennis had entered the apartment after slashing the tires on Little's car. After entering the apartment, Dennis proceeded to beat Barnes twenty-two times with the butt of a shotgun. When he was done with Barnes, he turned on Lumpkins, doing the same to her as he did to Barnes. Dennis was sentenced to the death penalty but his sentence was reversed by the Florida Supreme Court in 2020. On November 6, 2025, Labrant Dennis was re-sentenced to life in prison for the murders of Barnes and Lumpkins.

== Aftermath ==
In December 1996, the University of Miami agreed to a financial settlement with the families of Barnes and Lumpkins due to the murders having occurred in an on-campus apartment. All parties agreed to maintain the confidentiality of the settlement terms. But the Miami Herald reported that each family received more than $1 million.

== In popular culture ==
In 2003, the Discovery Channel documentary series The New Detectives covered the case in the episode named "Crimes of Passion" (S8; E10) with the similar murder case of Ralph Gawor from Fresno, California.

The Investigation Discovery documentary series The Perfect Murder, in a 2018 episode titled "The Last Blitz"' (S5; E10), depicts the Barnes-Lumpkins murders and the shock waves experienced by the University of Miami campus and community.

The Hulu documentary series Death in the Dorms, in a 2024 episode titled "Marlin Barnes" (S2; E3), covered the case and contains numerous interviews with family and friends of the victims.

== See also ==
- List of gridiron football players who died during their careers
