= Kenny McKinley =

American football player (1987–2010)

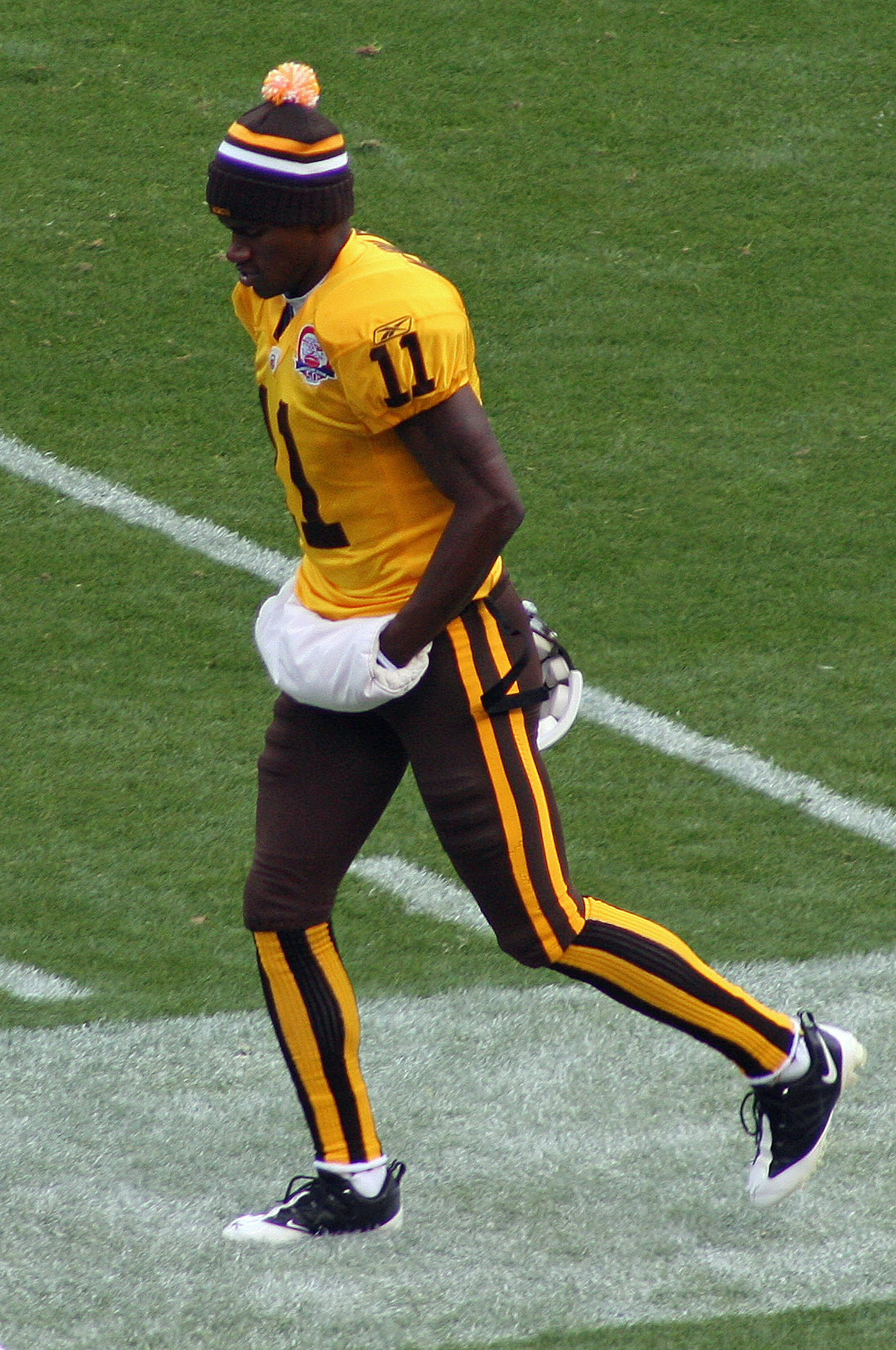
- McKinley with the Denver Broncos in 2009

No. 11
- Position: Wide receiver

Personal information
- Born: January 31, 1987; Mableton, Georgia, U.S.
- Died: September 20, 2010 (aged 23); Centennial, Colorado, U.S.
- Listed height: 6 ft 0 in (1.83 m)
- Listed weight: 183 lb (83 kg)

Career information
- High school: South Cobb (Austell, Georgia)
- College: South Carolina (2005–2008)
- NFL draft: 2009: 5th round, 141st overall pick

Career history
- Denver Broncos (2009–2010)

Awards and highlights
- First-team All-SEC (2007)

Career NFL statistics
- Return yards: 190
- Return touchdowns: 0
- Stats at Pro Football Reference

Kendrick L. McKinley (January 31, 1987 – September 20, 2010) was an American professional football player who was a wide receiver for the Denver Broncos of the National Football League (NFL). He was selected by the Broncos in the fifth round of the 2009 NFL draft. He played college football for the South Carolina Gamecocks.

== Early life and high school career ==
Born in Mableton, Georgia, he graduated from South Cobb High School in Austell in 2005. As a quarterback during his senior year, he passed for 1,470 yards and 16 touchdowns and rushed for 750 yards while scoring 12 touchdowns. He was rated the 29th-best player in the state of Georgia and the 54th-best athlete in the country by Rivals.com.

== College career ==
As a true freshman while playing for the University of South Carolina Gamecocks, in 2005, he worked his way into the starting lineup at wide receiver and also handled the punt return duties. He started six games and ranked third on the team with 25 catches for 291 yards and returned 18 punts for 83 yards.

During his sophomore year in 2006, McKinley started all 13 games and recorded 51 receptions and 880 yards, which ranked second on the team behind Sidney Rice. McKinley's best game was an eight-catch, 110-yard effort against Auburn, the first 100-yard receiving day in his career.

He would go on to earn first-team honors from: the SEC coaches (All-SEC), the Associated Press and CollegeFootballNews.com. He was second-team All-SEC by Rivals.com and honorable mention All-America honors from CollegeFootballNews.com.

Despite playing with turf toe most of the year, as the Gamecocks' #1 receiver, McKinley not only led the team but led the Southeastern Conference (SEC) in receptions (a then school-record 77), receptions per game (6.42) and in receiving yards per game (80.7). He also was number one at South Carolina in yards (968) and touchdowns (9). He had four 100-yard receiving games in 2007, including a school record 14 catch performance against Tennessee where he had a career-best 151 yards.

In 2008, McKinley entered his senior year as an All-America candidate that was in position to break every South Carolina school career receiving record. He began the 2008 campaign ranked tied for fourth in career receptions (153), sixth in career receiving yards (2,139) and tied for sixth in receiving touchdowns (15) in Carolina history. Despite being out of the lineup for a three-game stretch due to a right hamstring strain, he set school career records for receptions and receiving yards, while also closing out his career second on the school's all-time touchdown catches list. McKinley also placed his name in the SEC record books. His 207 receptions placed third in conference annals, becoming just the fifth SEC player to amass more than 200 catches in a career. He also became the 12th player in league history to record more than 2,700 receiving yards (2,781).

== Professional career ==
McKinley was selected by the Denver Broncos in the fifth round, 5th pick (141st overall) during the 2009 NFL draft. McKinley played in eight games in 2009 as a kick returner. He returned seven kicks for a total of 158 yards. He also recorded 3 special teams tackles.

He was placed on injured reserve with a knee injury on December 28, 2009.

== Death ==
McKinley was found dead on September 20, 2010, from an apparent self-inflicted gunshot wound. His death was reported as a suicide by local media, and later confirmed by members of the Arapahoe County Sheriff's office.

A 131-page report was released by the Arapahoe County Sheriff's Department on December 1, 2010, concluding the investigation into McKinley's death. It stated that depression over debt, injury and his post-playing career were the main factors for his suicide. The report stated that McKinley had a gambling problem and was deep in debt. His freshman roommate O.J. Murdock was also highly touted going into college, eventually being signed by the Tennessee Titans as an undrafted free agent. Murdock also died by suicide because of depression, injuries, and issues in his personal life on July 30, 2012.

== See also ==
- List of gridiron football players who died during their careers
