= Avery Atkins =

American football player (1987–2007)

No. 4
- Position: Cornerback

Personal information
- Born: May 29, 1987; Daytona Beach, Florida, U.S.
- Died: June 5, 2007 (aged 20); Port Orange, Florida, U.S.

Career information
- High school: Mainland
- College: Florida (2005); Bethune–Cookman (2006)

Avery Jamal Atkins (May 29, 1987 – July 5, 2007) was an American football cornerback. A highly touted prospect, he died in 2007 at the age of 20.

A native of Daytona Beach, Florida, Atkins attended Mainland High School, where he was an All-State cornerback and running back. Regarded as a four-star recruit by Rivals.com, he chose Florida over numerous offers, including Auburn, Florida State, Miami, Michigan, and South Carolina. Atkins was the highest-rated prospect in Urban Meyer's first recruiting class.

As a true freshman, Atkins started three games in the 2005 season. In the Florida–Florida State game he intercepted a pass and recovered a fumble. A projected starter, he played three games in 2006 before his coach, Urban Meyer, removed him from the team after a domestic violence incident.

== Death ==
On July 5, 2007, he was found dead in his car in Port Orange, Florida. An autopsy revealed he had high levels of ecstasy in his body as well as carbon monoxide. Police have ruled out a suicide attempt.

== See also ==
- List of gridiron football players who died during their careers
