= Roger Hagberg =

American gridiron football player (1939–1970)

No. 35, 30
- Positions: Fullback, flanker

Personal information
- Born: February 28, 1939; Winnebago, Minnesota, U.S.
- Died: April 15, 1970 (aged 31); Lafayette, California, U.S.
- Listed height: 6 ft 2 in (1.88 m)
- Listed weight: 216 lb (98 kg)

Career information
- College: Minnesota
- NFL draft: 1961: 10th round, 128th overall pick

Career history
- Winnipeg Blue Bombers (1961–1964); Oakland Raiders (1965-1969)

Awards and highlights
- AFL champion (1967); 2× Grey Cup champion (1961, 1962); National champion (1960)

Career AFL statistics
- Rushing yards: 766
- Rushing average: 3.9
- Receptions: 58
- Receiving yards: 645
- Total touchdowns: 8
- Stats at Pro Football Reference

Roger Hagberg (February 28, 1939 – April 15, 1970) was a professional gridiron football player, who played running back for five seasons for the Oakland Raiders and four seasons with the Winnipeg Blue Bombers.

Hagberg's family moved to Rochester, Minnesota, when he was young, and he grew up there. His father worked as a probation officer and his mother taught Latin at Central Junior High School. He graduated from Rochester High School in 1957 and attended the University of Minnesota.

Hagberg was killed on April 15, 1970, when he was thrown out of his car and struck by two other vehicles. Oakland Raiders' quarterback Daryle Lamonica attended Roger Hagberg's funeral in Rochester.

== See also ==
- List of gridiron football players who died during their careers
