= David Croudip =

American football player (1958–1988)

No. 28, 30
- Position: Defensive back

Personal information
- Born: January 25, 1958; Indianapolis, Indiana, U.S.
- Died: October 10, 1988 (aged 30); Duluth, Georgia, U.S.
- Listed height: 5 ft 8 in (1.73 m)
- Listed weight: 183 lb (83 kg)

Career information
- High school: Compton (Compton, California)
- College: San Diego State
- NFL draft: 1983: undrafted

Career history
- Los Angeles Express (1983); Houston Gamblers (1984); Los Angeles Rams (1984); San Diego Chargers (1985); Atlanta Falcons (1985–1988)
- Stats at Pro Football Reference

David Rodney Croudip (January 25, 1958 – October 10, 1988) was an American professional football defensive back. He played for the Los Angeles Rams, San Diego Chargers and Atlanta Falcons of the National Football League (NFL) and the United States Football League (USFL)'s Los Angeles Express and Houston Gamblers. Croudip died on October 10, 1988, at age 30. It was later determined he had ingested a fatal dose of cocaine. His death would be the first of three to strike the Falcons organization in the span of two years. The next year, offensive tackle Ralph Norwood was killed in a one-car crash. Four weeks later, tight end Brad Beckman was killed in a separate automobile collision.

== See also ==
- List of gridiron football players who died during their careers
