= Brad Beckman =

American football player (1964–1989)

No. 88, 83
- Position: Tight end

Personal information
- Born: December 31, 1964; Lincoln, Nebraska, U.S.
- Died: December 18, 1989 (aged 24); Lilburn, Georgia, U.S.
- Listed height: 6 ft 3 in (1.91 m)
- Listed weight: 236 lb (107 kg)

Career information
- High school: Omaha Northwest (NE)
- College: Nebraska-Omaha
- NFL draft: 1988: 7th round, 183rd overall pick

Career history
- Minnesota Vikings (1988)*; New York Giants (1988); Atlanta Falcons (1989)
- * Offseason or practice squad member only

Career NFL statistics
- Receptions: 11
- Receiving yards: 102
- Total touchdowns: 1
- Stats at Pro Football Reference

Bradley Scott Beckman (December 31, 1964 – December 18, 1989) was an American professional football tight end in the National Football League (NFL) for the New York Giants and the Atlanta Falcons. He played college football at the University of Nebraska at Omaha and was selected in the seventh round of the 1988 NFL draft by the Minnesota Vikings.

Beckman was killed when the car he was a passenger in bumped a car in front of it and then lost control and was hit broadside by a truck. The accident was on I-85 near Lilburn in icy conditions on December 18, 1989, nearly two weeks before Beckman's 25th birthday. His death was the second one for the Falcons that year, and the third in the space of two years. Four weeks prior, offensive tackle Ralph Norwood died in a separate traffic collision; a year before, cornerback David Croudip died of a cocaine overdose. At the time of his death, the Falcons had played 15 out of 16 games in the season. Beckman had played in all 15 games for the Falcons up to that point, starting in two of them.

== See also ==
- List of gridiron football players who died during their careers
