= Harry Hood (Canadian football) =

Canadian football player (c. 1926–1954)

No. 5
- Position: Halfback

Personal information
- Born: c. 1926; Winnipeg, Manitoba, Canada
- Died: May 18, 1954 (aged 27–28)
- Listed height: 5 ft 10 in (1.78 m)
- Listed weight: 175 lb (79 kg)

Career history
- 1945–1947: Winnipeg Blue Bombers
- 1948–1952: Calgary Stampeders

Awards and highlights
- Grey Cup champion (1948)

Harry Hood (c. 1926 – May 18, 1954) was a Canadian professional football player who played for the Calgary Stampeders and Winnipeg Blue Bombers. He won the Grey Cup with the Stampeders in 1948, who went undefeated that year. He previously played junior football in Winnipeg. His number 5 is retired by the Stampeders.

== See also ==
- List of gridiron football players who died during their careers
