= List of grandfather clauses =

A grandfather clause (or grandfather policy or grandfathering) is a provision in which an old rule continues to apply to some existing situations while a new rule will apply to all future cases. Those exempt from the new rule are said to have grandfather rights or acquired rights, or to have been grandfathered in. Frequently, the exemption is limited; it may extend for a set time, or it may be lost under certain circumstances. For example, a grandfathered power plant might be exempt from new, more restrictive pollution laws, but the exception may be revoked and the new rules would apply if the plant were expanded. Often, such a provision is used as a compromise or out of practicality, to allow new rules to be enacted without upsetting a well-established logistical or political situation. This extends the idea of a rule not being retroactively applied.

== List of examples ==
=== Technology ===
- Tablet computers (and similar devices) with screen sizes below eight inches which ran Windows Phone 8 or Windows Phone 8.1 featured a traditional Windows desktop with legacy app support, alongside the ability to run the newer Metro-style apps. However, newer devices with sub-8-inch screens that ran the successor Windows 10 Mobile operating system had no legacy app capability, and, as such, could only run apps downloaded from the Windows Store. Most (if not all) owners of the older Windows 8 devices of that screen size class who upgrade to Windows 10 can still retain the old-style desktop and legacy app support, despite this upgrade.
- The Windows operating system has had several exceptions in the past.
  - When extended support for Windows 7 ended on January 14, 2020, anyone using the OS no longer got security updates and were encouraged to upgrade to a newer OS or PC. However, Microsoft allowed companies and businesses that had the Professional and Enterprise volume licensed editions of Windows 7 to pay for additional support to give them time to migrate to newer operating systems like Windows 8.1 or Windows 10. Paid support for Windows 7 ended on January 10, 2023.
  - When support for Windows 10 version 1703 ended on October 9, 2018, anyone using Windows 10 1703 no longer got security updates and were encouraged to upgrade to a newer version of Windows 10, such as version 1809. However, Microsoft allowed Surface Hub devices (which were no longer supported on newer versions of Windows 10) to still receive security updates for a longer period of time. Surface Hub devices running Windows 10 1703 are unsupported as of March 9, 2021.
  - When support for Windows 10 version 22H2 ended on October 14, 2025, anyone using Windows 10 no longer got security updates and were encouraged to upgrade to a newer version of Windows 11. However, Microsoft allowed devices subscribed to the Extended Security Update (ESU) service to still receive security updates for one year, extending security support until October 13, 2026.

=== Science ===
- Some parts of bacterial taxonomy are legacied in a problematic state due to prevailing use in medical and industrial communities. A more proper name accepted by the microbiologist might not be used at all.

=== Law ===
- Many jurisdictions prohibit ex post facto laws, and grandfather clauses can be used to prevent a law from having retroactive effects. For example: In the UK, the offence of indecent assault is still charged in respect of crimes committed before the offence was abolished and replaced with sexual assault (among others) by the Sexual Offences Act 2003.
- Many acts requiring registration to practice a particular profession incorporated transition or "grandfather sections" allowing those who had already practised for a specified time (often three or four years) to be registered under the act even if they did not have the training or qualifications required for new applications for registration. Examples are the Nurses Registration Act 1901 in New Zealand and the Nurses Registration Act 1919 in England and Wales.

==== Canada ====
- In 1965, the Canadian government under Prime Minister Lester B. Pearson passed legislation that required senators to retire when they reached the age of 75. However, senators appointed before the legislation was passed were exempted from the mandatory retirement rule.
- When Quebec enacted the Charter of the French Language in 1977, making French the province's official language, the famous Montreal kosher-style deli Schwartz's was allowed to keep its name with the apostrophe, a feature not used in French in the possessive form.
- During Canada's federal Redistribution, a grandfather clause ensures that no province can have fewer seats after Redistribution than it did in 1985.

==== Macau ====
- In 2012, Macau increased the permitted age of entering casinos to 21. However, casino employees between the ages of 18 and 21 before the change were still permitted to enter their places of employment. This category was exhausted by the end of 2015.

==== United States ====
- Section 1 of Article Two of the United States Constitution requires that the President be a natural born citizen of the United States. However, at the beginning there had to be another category of persons eligible for that office: those who were citizens of the United States at the time of the adoption of the Constitution. Without that provision, it would have required a strained reading to construe that all Presidents born in the colonial era were born in the United States, which did not exist prior to the adoption of the United States Declaration of Independence on July 4, 1776.
- In 1949, standards were passed requiring certain fire safety improvements in schools. However, older schools, such as the Our Lady of the Angels School in Illinois, were not required to be retrofitted to meet the requirements, leading to the deadly Our Lady of the Angels School fire in which 92 students and three teachers died.
- In 1951, the Twenty-second Amendment to the United States Constitution was passed and ruled that presidents are only allowed to be elected to two terms; other sections include that a president shall only be elected to one term if their first term is less than two years past the day scheduled inaugurations take place. It did not apply to the incumbent president Harry S. Truman, but he ended up dropping out of the 1952 race after winning his only full term in 1948.
- In the 1980s, as states in the US were increasing the permitted age of drinking to 21 years, many people who were under 21 but of legal drinking age before the change were still permitted to purchase and drink alcoholic beverages. Similar conditions applied when New Jersey and certain counties in New York raised tobacco purchase ages from 18 to 19 years in the early 2000s.
- In 1984, Mississippi passed a law changing its official mode of capital punishment from the gas chamber to lethal injection. Under the new law, anyone sentenced after July 1, 1984, was to be executed by lethal injection; those condemned before that date were "grandfathered" into the gas chamber. Therefore, three more convicted murderers would die in the chamber—Edward Earl Johnson and Connie Ray Evans in 1987, and Leo Edwards in 1989. In 1998, the Mississippi Legislature changed the execution law to allow all death row inmates to be executed by lethal injection.
- During the Federal Assault Weapons Ban publicized on August 25, 1994, certain firearms made before the ban's enactment were legal to own. Automatic weapons that were manufactured and registered before the Firearm Owners Protection Act (enacted May 19, 1986) may legally be transferred to civilians.
- Jerry Brown, who served as Governor of California from 1975 to 1983, was able to run for the governorship again in 2010 and 2014 due to a grandfather clause in the state constitution's two-term limit that went to effect in 1990.
- In 2013, Tennessee enacted a law requiring that products labeled as "Tennessee whiskey" be produced in the state, meet the legal definition of bourbon whiskey, and also use the Lincoln County Process. The law specifically allowed Benjamin Prichard's Tennessee Whiskey, which does not use the Lincoln County Process, to continue to be labeled as such.
- In March 2026 the Federal Communications Commission issued an order banning the sale of new foreign-made wifi routers and models made after the order unless a company has an exemption to do from the Pentagon or the Department of Homeland Security on national security grounds. However the order did not effect previously purchased routers or prevent the continued sale, import, or marketing of router models that were previously approved through the FCC’s equipment authorization process.

=== Standards compliance ===
- Strict building codes to withstand frequent seismic activity were implemented in Japan in 1981. These codes applied only to new buildings, and existing buildings were not required to upgrade to meet the codes. One result of this was that during the great Kobe earthquake in 1995, many of the pre-1981 buildings were destroyed or condemned, whereas most buildings built post-1981, in accordance with the new building codes, withstood the earthquake without structural damage.
- Construction codes also require newly constructed buildings to be certain distances from roads, shorelines, bodies of water, etc. Already-existing structures that were built prior to the laws going into effect are often exempt, especially private homes. Moderate degrees of upkeep, repairs, and renovations to such dwellings may also be permitted, but such alterations may be limited to less than a percentage of the total building structure; if more than that amount of the building must be replaced, the owners may be required to have it relocated to a code-compliant locale. Upgrades in building-construction, safety, utilities, etc. may be required of the rebuilt home, as well.
- Wigwag-style railroad crossing signals were deemed inadequate in 1949 and new installations were banned in the United States. Existing wigwag signals were allowed to remain and 75 years later, there are still about 17 wigwag signals in use on railroads in the United States.
- The UK's national rail infrastructure management company Network Rail requires new locomotives and rolling stock to pass tests for electromagnetic compatibility (EMC) to ensure that they do not interfere with signalling equipment. Some old diesel locomotives, which have been in service for many years without causing such interference, are exempted from EMC tests and are said to have acquired grandfather rights.
- The Steel Electric-class ferryboats used by Washington State Ferries were in violation of several U.S. Coast Guard regulations, but because they were built in 1927, before the enactment of the regulations, they were allowed to sail. Those ferries were decommissioned in 2008.
- Tolled highways that existed before the Interstate Highway System are exempt from Interstate standards despite being designated as Interstate highways. Many such toll roads (particularly the Pennsylvania Turnpike) remain as such. However, tolled highways built since the Interstate system, such as the tolled section of PA Route 60 and PA Turnpike 576, must be built or upgraded to Interstate standards before receiving Interstate designation. Both highways are to be part of the Interstate system, with PA 60 now I-376 and PA Turnpike 576 to become I-576 in the near future. As well, U.S. Interstate Highway standards mandate a minimum 11-foot median; however, highways built before those standards have been grandfathered into the system. The Kansas Turnpike is the most notable example, as it has been retrofitted with a Jersey barrier along its entire 236-mile (380-km) length.
- The earliest Ontario dual highways do not meet current standards; however, it would be prohibitively expensive to immediately rebuild them all to updated guidelines, unless a reconstruction is warranted by safety concerns and traffic levels. As a result, substandard sections of freeways such as low overpasses and short acceleration/deceleration lanes are often retrofitted with guard rails, warning signage, lower speed limits, or lighting.
- The United States Federal Communications Commission has required all radio stations licensed in the United States since the 1930s to have four-letter call signs starting with a W (for stations east of the Mississippi River) or a K (for stations west of the Mississippi River). But stations with three-letter call signs and stations west of the Mississippi River starting with a W and east of the Mississippi River starting with a K—such as WRR in Dallas, WHO in Des Moines and WHB in Kansas City, plus KQV and KYW in Pennsylvania, all licensed before the 1930s—have been permitted to keep their call signs. In the western United States, KOA in Denver, KGA in Spokane, KEX in Portland, and KHJ and KFI in Los Angeles, among many others, have been permitted to keep their original or reassigned three-letter call signs. In addition, a new or existing station may adopt a three-letter call set if they have a sister radio or TV station in that market with those calls (examples include WWL-TV New Orleans, WJZ-FM Baltimore and WGY-FM Albany, New York). (Note that stations licensed in Louisiana and Minnesota, the two states with significant territory on both sides of the Mississippi, are allowed to use call signs starting with either W or K, regardless of their location with respect to the river.)
- In aviation, grandfather rights refers to the control that airlines exert over "slots" (that is, times allotted for access to runways). While the trend in airport management has been to reassert control over these slots, many airlines are able to retain their traditional rights based on current licences.
- In the UK, until 1992, holders of ordinary car driving licences were allowed to drive buses of any size, provided that the use was not commercial and that there was no element of "hire or reward" in the vehicles' use; in other words, no one was paying to be carried. The law was changed in 1992 so that all drivers of large buses had to hold a PCV (PSV) licence, but anyone who had driven large buses could apply for grandfather rights to carry on doing so.
- Some MOT test standards in the UK do not apply to vehicles first registered prior to the implementation of the legislation that introduced them. For example, vehicles first registered prior to January 1, 1973, are exempt from the requirement to use retro-reflective yellow/white vehicle registration plates and vehicles first registered prior to January 1, 1965, are exempt from seat belt standards/legislation unless they have been retrospectively fitted.
- In some U.S. states, the inspection/maintenance (I/M) programs for motor vehicle emission testing have a rolling chassis exemption, e.g. a motor vehicle model 25 years old or more is exempted from emission tests.
- Today all tram drivers in Melbourne, Australia, are required to have full Victorian road vehicle licences but anyone who served as a tram driver before the rule was introduced was exempt from this requirement.
- In the U.S., old electrical installations, such as knob-and-tube wiring or aluminum building wiring, are not required to be updated to follow the modern National Electrical Code unless significant changes are made to the circuit.

=== Sports ===
- In 1920, when Major League Baseball introduced the prohibition of the spitball, the league recognized that some professional pitchers had nearly built their careers on using the spitball. The league made an exception for 17 named players, who were permitted to throw spitballs for the rest of their careers. Burleigh Grimes threw the last legal spitball in 1934.
- In 1958, Major League Baseball passed a rule that required any new fields built after that point to have a minimum distance of 325 feet (99 m) from home plate to the fences in left and right field, and 400 feet (120 m) to center. (Rule 1.04, Note(a)). This rule was passed to avoid situations like the Polo Grounds (which had extremely short distance down the lines, 258 ft (79 m). to right and 280 ft (85 m). to left.) and the Los Angeles Coliseum, (which had 251 ft (77 m). down the left field line). However, older ballparks that were built before 1958, such as Fenway Park and Wrigley Field, were grandfathered in and allowed to keep their original dimensions. Since the opening of Baltimore's Camden Yards (1992), the "minimum distance" rule has been ignored.
- Beginning in the 1979–80 season, the National Hockey League required all players to wear helmets. Nevertheless, if a player had signed his first professional contract before this ruling, he was allowed to play without a helmet if he so desired. Craig MacTavish was the last player to do so, playing without a helmet up until his retirement in 1997. Other notable players include Guy Lafleur and Rod Langway, who retired in 1991 and 1993, respectively. A similar rule was passed for NHL officials for the 1988–89 season; any official who started his career before the ruling could also go helmet-less if they so desired. Kerry Fraser was the last referee who was not required to wear a helmet, until the ratification of the new NHL Officials Association collective bargaining agreement on March 21, 2006, required all remaining helmet-less officials to wear one. The NHL created a similar rule in 2013 requiring visors for players with fewer than 25 games' experience. As of the 2024–25 season, five players remain who play without visors: Jamie Benn, Zach Bogosian, Matt Martin, Ryan Reaves and Ryan O'Reilly.
- Major League Baseball rule 1.16 requires players who were not in the major leagues before 1983 to wear a batting helmet with at least one earflap. The last player to wear a flapless helmet was the Florida Marlins' Tim Raines, who retired in 2002 (career began in 1979). The last player eligible to do so was Julio Franco, who retired in 2007 (career began in 1982), although he opted to use a flapped helmet.
- For many decades, American League (AL) umpires working behind home plate used large, balloon-style chest protectors worn outside the shirt or coat, while their counterparts in the National League wore chest protectors inside the shirt or coat, more akin to those worn by catchers. In 1977, the AL ruled that all umpires entering the league that year and in the future had to wear the inside protector, although umpires already in the league who were using the outside protector could continue to do so. The last umpire to regularly wear the outside protector was Jerry Neudecker, who retired after the 1985 season. (Since 2000, Major League Baseball has used the same umpire crews for both leagues.)
- In 1991, the Baseball Hall of Fame added a rule that anyone who was banned from MLB, living or deceased, will immediately be declared ineligible for induction to the Baseball Hall of Fame (the rule was passed following the banishment of Pete Rose from the MLB two years earlier). However, anyone who was already enshrined in the Baseball Hall of Fame when they were banned would continue to be enshrined. The rule has allowed players like Willie Mays, Mickey Mantle, and Roberto Alomar to remained enshrined in the Hall of Fame despite being banned from Major League Baseball after their enshrinement (although Mays and Mantle were later reinstated to Major League Baseball).
- In 1999, the Downtown Athletic Club added a rule that any Heisman Trophies made since 1999 cannot be sold, and any player who tries to do so will be met with a lawsuit (the rule was passed after O. J. Simpson was forced to sell his 1968 trophy in February 1999 to pay part of the settlement of the civil trial in the O. J. Simpson murder case). However, any existing Heisman Trophies awarded before 1999 can be sold. After the Downtown Athletic Club went bankrupt in 2001, its successor, The Heisman Trophy Trust, retained the rule. It has yet to be challenged in court by any post-1998 Heisman Trophy winner.
- The NFL outlawed the one-bar facemask for the 2004 season but allowed existing users to continue to wear them (even though by that time, the mask had mostly fallen out of favor, save for a handful of kickers/punters). Scott Player was the last player to wear the one-bar facemask in 2007.
- The National Football League (NFL) currently prohibits corporate ownership of teams. Ownership groups can have no more than 24 members, and at least one partner must hold a 30% ownership stake. The league has exempted the Green Bay Packers from this rule; the team has been owned by a publicly owned, nonprofit corporation since 1923, decades before the league's current ownership rules were put in place in the 1980s.
- Similarly, in association football the Deutsche Fußball Liga, which operates the Bundesliga and 2. Bundesliga, prohibits corporate ownership of more than 49% of teams and rebranding as well (see 50+1 rule). The Royal Dutch Football Association has a similar rule with regard to the Eredivisie. However, Bayer Leverkusen and PSV Eindhoven can maintain their property and names as they were founded in the first decades of the twentieth century by Bayer and Philips as their sport teams. Another Bundesliga side, VfL Wolfsburg, is allowed to remain under the ownership of Volkswagen as it was founded in 1945 as a club for VW workers.
- Before 2022, five schools that are members of NCAA Division III, a classification whose members are generally not allowed to offer athletic scholarships, had been specifically allowed to award scholarships in one or two sports, with at most one for each sex. Each of these schools had a men's team that participated in the NCAA University Division, the predecessor to today's Division I, before the NCAA adopted its current three-division setup in 1973. (The NCAA did not award national championships in women's sports until 1980–81 in Division II and Division III, and 1981–82 in Division I.) Three other schools were formerly grandfathered, but have either moved their Division I sports to Division III or discontinued them entirely. A change in Division III rules in early 2022 now allows any Division III school that sponsors a sport that does not have a Division III championship to award scholarships in that sport. It did not affect the aforementioned schools' ability to offer scholarships.
- In 2006, NASCAR passed a rule that required teams to field no more than four cars. Since Roush Racing had five cars, they could continue to field five cars until the end of 2009.
- Jackie Robinson's #42 shirt, which he wore when he broke Major League Baseball's 20th-century color line and throughout his Hall of Fame career with the Brooklyn Dodgers, is the subject of two such grandfather clauses.
  - In 1997, MLB prohibited all teams from issuing #42 in the future; current players wearing #42 were allowed to continue to do so. The New York Yankees' closer Mariano Rivera was the last active player to be grandfathered in, wearing #42 until he retired after the 2013 season. However, since 2009, all uniformed personnel (players, managers, coaches, umpires) are required to wear #42 (without names) on Jackie Robinson Day.
  - The prohibition on issuing #42 also extended to Minor League Baseball, where Fredericksburg Nationals owner/coach Art Silber remains grandfathered to wear it.
  - In 2014, Robinson's alma mater of UCLA, where he played four sports from 1939 to 1941, retired #42 across its entire athletic program. (The men's basketball team had previously retired the number for Walt Hazzard.) Three athletes who were wearing the number at the time (in women's soccer, softball, and football) were allowed to continue wearing the number for the rest of their UCLA careers.
- The NFL introduced a numbering system for the 1973 season, requiring players to be numbered by position. Players who played in the NFL in 1972 and earlier were allowed to keep their old numbers if their number was outside of their range for their position, although New York Giants linebacker Brad Van Pelt wore number 10 despite entering the league in 1973. (Linebackers had to be numbered in the 50s at the time; from 1984 through 2020, they were allowed to wear numbers in the 50s or 90s, and since 2021, they may wear any number from 1-59 and 90-99. Van Pelt got away with it because he was the team's backup kicker his rookie season.) The last player to be covered by the grandfather clause was Julius Adams, a defensive end (1971–1985, 1987) for the New England Patriots, who wore number 85 through the 1985 season. He wore number 69 during a brief return two years later.
  - Similarly, the NFL also banned the use of the numbers 0 and 00 (both treated a single number) for uniforms around the same time, but players Jim Otto and Ken Burrough used the number throughout the 1970s.
- The National Hot Rod Association is enforcing a grandfather clause banning energy drink sponsors from entering the sport if they were not sponsoring cars as of April 24, 2008, pursuant to the five-year extension of its sponsorship with Coca-Cola, which is changing the title sponsorship from Powerade to Full Throttle Energy Drink.
- Even though tobacco advertising in car racing was banned, the Marlboro cigarette brand, owned by British American Tobacco in Canada and Philip Morris International elsewhere, is grandfathered in to sponsoring a car in the F1 series on the agreement that the name is not shown in places that banned it.
- NASCAR allowed some grandfathered sponsorships by energy drink brands in the top-level Monster Energy Cup Series, while rules prohibited new sponsors in that category. Similar policies with regard to telecommunications companies were in effect when the series was sponsored by Sprint. Additionally, some insurance company sponsorships were grandfathered in when the second-level series now known as the Xfinity Series was sponsored by Nationwide Insurance.
- In 2013, the Professional Bull Riders made it mandatory that all contestants at their events who were born on or after October 15, 1994, have to ride with helmets. Those born before that date were grandfathered in and permitted to ride with their cowboy hats if so desired.
- In August 2014, the Baseball Hall of Fame and the Baseball Writers' Association of America (BBWAA) announced changes to the Hall of Fame balloting process effective with the election for the Hall's induction class of 2015. The most significant change was reducing the time frame of eligibility for recently retired players from 15 years to 10. Three players on the 2015 BBWAA ballot who had appeared on more than 10 previous ballots—Don Mattingly, Lee Smith, and Alan Trammell—were exempted from this change, and remained eligible for 15 years (provided they received enough votes to stay on the ballot).
- In November 2015, Little League Baseball changed its age determination date from April 30 to August 31—a calendar date that falls after the completion of all of the organization's World Series tournaments—effective with the 2018 season. The rule was written so that players born between May 1 and August 31, 2005, who would otherwise have been denied their 12-year-old season in the flagship Little League division, would be counted as 12-year-olds in the 2018 season.
- In December 2016, French Rugby Federation (FFR) president Bernard Laporte announced that all future members of France national teams in rugby union and rugby sevens would be required to hold French passports. At the time, eligibility rules of World Rugby, the sport's international governing body, required only three years' residency for national team eligibility, and did not require citizenship. Players who had represented France prior to the FFR policy change remain eligible for national team selection.
- For the 2021 FIA World Endurance Championship, the new Le Mans Hypercar (LMH) top class of cars was introduced, replacing the LMP1 ruleset. Due to a lack of entries in the initial seasons, and a commitment from Alpine to develop an LMH-compliant car in subsequent years (the A424), Alpine were permitted to race in the 2021 and 2022 seasons with second-hand Rebellion R13 LMP1 cars rebadged as the Alpine A480 under a grandfather clause.
- On August 11, 2022, the National Basketball Association announced that #6 would be retired league-wide to honor Bill Russell, who had died on July 31. However, players already wearing #6 at the time of the announcement may continue to do so until their retirement. As of the 2025–26 NBA season Jaylin Williams remains the only player to use the number.
- On March 6, 2024, The R&A announced winners of The Open Championship would be eligible to participate only until age 55. However, players who won The Open Championship in 2023 and prior years (Brian Harman the last) will keep eligibility until age 60 based on the previous rule.
- Beginning with the 2025 season under the new NASCAR Cup Series charter agreement, teams are limited to fielding a maximum of three charter car entries. However Hendrick Motorsports and Joe Gibbs Racing who field four charter entry cars where allowed to continue to do so.
