= Tommy Lumsden =

Canadian football player

Tom Lumsden
Profile
- Positions: Guard, End

Personal information
- Born: c. 1930; Winnipeg, Manitoba
- Died: June 24, 1955 (aged 25); Winnipeg, Manitoba
- Listed height: 6 ft 3 in (1.91 m)
- Listed weight: 220 lb (100 kg)

Career history
- 1951–1954: Winnipeg Blue Bombers

Thomas W. Lumsden (c. 1930 – June 24, 1955) was a Canadian professional football player who played for the Winnipeg Blue Bombers. He previously played for the Winnipeg Light Infantry Junior team. The Tommy Lumsden Memorial Trophy is presented annually to the Bombers' Top Canadian. His No. 75 number isn't officially retired by the club but is unavailable in his honour. He is a member of the Blue Bombers' Hall of Fame. Lumsden died in a Winnipeg hospital 1955 at the age of 25 after emergency gallbladder surgery following an "attack" while driving near Beausejour, Manitoba.
