= List of baseball players who died during their careers =

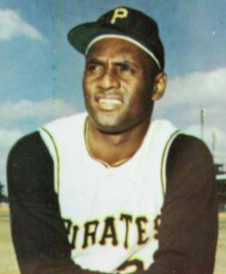
Roberto Clemente died in a plane crash following the 1972 season.

This is a list of baseball players who died during their careers. While some of these deaths occurred during a game, the majority were the result of accidents off the field, illnesses, acts of violence, or suicide.

Repeated studies have shown that contemporary Major League Baseball players have a greater life expectancy than males in the general U.S. population — about five years more, on average, which is attributed to their superior fitness and healthy lifestyles. The longer the active career, the longer the player lives, on average. This correlation is attributed to the maintenance of fitness and increased wealth.

== Deaths of active players ==
This is a list of notable deaths in baseball and untimely deaths of active professional baseball players.

†	Elected to the Baseball Hall of Fame

=== Major League Baseball ===
The following Major League Baseball players died during their careers.

Player	Age	Position	Team	Cause of death	Year	Ref(s)
Nick Adenhart	22	Pitcher	Los Angeles Angels of Anaheim	automobile crash	2009	
Harry Agganis	26	First baseman	Boston Red Sox	pulmonary embolism	1955	
Steve Bechler	23	Pitcher	Baltimore Orioles	complications from use of ephedra	2003	
Cy Bentley	22	Pitcher	Middletown Mansfields	tuberculosis	1873	
Marty Bergen	28	Catcher	Boston Beaneaters	suicide by throat-cutting (murder–suicide)	1900	
Bill Blair	26	Pitcher	Chicago Cubs	influenza	1890	
Tony Boeckel	31	Third baseman	Boston Braves	automobile crash	1924	
Tiny Bonham	36	Pitcher	Pittsburgh Pirates	appendicitis	1949	
Lyman Bostock	27	Outfielder	California Angels	homicide by firearm	1978	
Hal Carlson	38	Pitcher	Chicago Cubs	stomach hemorrhage	1930	
Joe Cassidy	23	Shortstop	Washington Senators	purpura hemorrhagia	1906	
Ray Chapman	29	Shortstop	Cleveland Indians	struck on the head by a pitch	1920	
Roberto Clemente^{†}	38	Outfielder	Pittsburgh Pirates	plane crash	1972	
King Cole	29	Pitcher	New York Yankees	lung cancer	1916	
Hub Collins	28	Second baseman	Brooklyn Dodgers	typhoid fever	1892	
Tim Crews	31	Pitcher	Cleveland Indians (Note: Crews played his entire six-year career with the Los Angeles Dodgers, but the end of the 1992 season he became a free agent and signed with the Cleveland Indians on January 22, 1993. He died during spring training.)	boat crash (boating while intoxicated; also killed Steve Olin)	1993	
Amos Cross	28	Catcher	Louisville Colonels	tuberculosis	1888	
Mike Darr	25	Outfielder	San Diego Padres	automobile crash (driving while intoxicated)	2002	
Jake Daubert	40	First baseman	Cincinnati Reds	appendicitis	1924	
Ed Delahanty^{†}	35	Outfielder	Washington Senators	drowned, swept over Niagara Falls	1903	
Pickles Dillhoefer	28	Catcher	St. Louis Cardinals	typhoid fever	1922	
Cozy Dolan	34	Outfielder	Boston Braves	typhoid fever	1907	
Tim Donahue	32	Catcher	Washington Senators	Addison's disease	1902	
Jim Doyle	30	Third baseman	Chicago Cubs	appendicitis	1912	
Paul Edmondson	27	Pitcher	Chicago White Sox	automobile crash	1970	
Charlie Ferguson	25	Pitcher	Philadelphia Quakers	typhoid fever	1888	
José Fernández	24	Pitcher	Miami Marlins	boat crash (boating while intoxicated)	2016	
Neal Finn	29	Second baseman	Philadelphia Phillies	duodenal ulcer	1933	
Jim Fogarty	27	Outfielder	Philadelphia Athletics	tuberculosis	1891	
Danny Frisella	30	Pitcher	Milwaukee Brewers	dune buggy crash	1977	
Miguel Fuentes	23	Pitcher	Seattle Pilots	homicide by firearm	1970	
Tom Gastall	24	Catcher	Baltimore Orioles	drowning after escaping plane crash wreckage	1956	
Marv Goodwin	34	Pitcher	Cincinnati Reds	plane crash	1925	
Marc Hall	27	Pitcher	Detroit Tigers	diabetes	1915	
Greg Halman	24	Outfielder	Seattle Mariners	homicide by stabbing (fratricide)	2011	
Josh Hancock	29	Pitcher	St. Louis Cardinals	automobile crash (driving while intoxicated)	2007	
Clyde Hatter	29	Pitcher	Detroit Tigers	heart attack	1937	
Willard Hershberger	30	Catcher	Cincinnati Reds	suicide by throat-cutting	1940	
Herman Hill	25	Outfielder	St. Louis Cardinals (Note: Hill's only major league playing experience was with the Minnesota Twins in 1969 and '70. About three weeks after the 1970 season ended, Hill was traded to St. Louis. However, Hill never actually played for St. Louis, as he died during that off-season.)	drowned while swimming	1970	
Charlie Hodes	27	Catcher/Outfielder	Brooklyn Atlantics	tuberculosis	1875	
Ken Hubbs	22	Second baseman	Chicago Cubs	plane crash	1964	
Addie Joss^{†}	31	Pitcher	Cleveland Indians	meningitis	1911	
Joe Kennedy	28	Pitcher	Toronto Blue Jays (Note: Technically, Kennedy was a free agent at the time of his death, having been granted free agency by Toronto about three weeks prior.)	hypertensive heart disease	2007	
Darryl Kile	33	Pitcher	St. Louis Cardinals	heart attack	2002	
Len Koenecke	31	Outfielder	Brooklyn Dodgers (Note: Technically, Koenecke had just been cut from the Dodgers and his contract sold to the minor league Rochester Red Wings. This occurred less than 24 hours before his death. With the season coming to an end Koenecke was not expected to report to Rochester, but was instead sent on a plane home to New York City.)	cerebral hemorrhage sustained during a fight on an airplane	1935	
Jim Korwan	25	Pitcher	Chicago Colts	tuberculosis	1899	
Joe Leonard	26	Third baseman	Washington Senators	appendicitis	1920	
Walter Lerian	26	Catcher	Philadelphia Phillies	automobile crash	1929	
Cory Lidle	34	Pitcher	New York Yankees	plane crash	2006	
Pat Luby	30	Pitcher	Louisville Colonels	tuberculosis	1899	
Steve Macko	27	Infielder	Chicago Cubs (Note: Macko last played in August of 1980, when he was injured in a game. The injury was severe enough to keep him on the disabled list for the rest of 1980. In the course of doctor's examinations over the winter in early 1981, Macko was discovered to have cancer, which he fought through 1981. He traveled with the Cubs and remained on the disabled list through the entire 1981 season.)	testicular cancer	1981	
Austin McHenry	27	Outfielder	St. Louis Cardinals	brain tumor	1922	
Doc McJames	27	Pitcher	Brooklyn Superbas (Note: Technically, McJames was no longer actively involved in baseball at the time of his death. He had been released by Brooklyn in July, due the effects of tuberculosis. McJames was working as a doctor at the time of his death nine weeks later in September; the tuberculosis which ended his baseball career was a factor in his death.)	tuberculosis, complicated by injuries sustained in a carriage accident	1901	
Alex McKinnon	30	First baseman	Pittsburgh Alleghenys	typhoid fever	1887	
Edgar McNabb	28	Pitcher	Baltimore Orioles	suicide by firearm (murder–suicide)	1894	
Win Mercer	28	Pitcher	Detroit Tigers	suicide by gas	1903	
Mike Miley	23	Shortstop	California Angels	automobile crash	1977	
Tom Miller	26	Catcher	St. Louis Brown Stockings	indeterminate illness	1876	
Al Montgomery	21	Catcher	New York Giants (Note: Montgomery's only major league playing experience came with the Boston Braves in 1941. He was sold to the Giants in February of 1942, and spent spring training with the Giants. Montgomery died in a car accident on the trip north, before the start of the regular season.)	automobile crash	1942	
Bob Moose	29	Pitcher	Pittsburgh Pirates	automobile crash	1976	
Ed Morris	32	Pitcher	Boston Red Sox	homicide by stabbing	1932	
Thurman Munson	32	Catcher	New York Yankees	plane crash	1979	
Cinders O'Brien	24	Pitcher	St. Louis Browns (Note: O'Brien played for the Boston Reds in 1891 but was under contract with the St. Louis Browns at the time of his death before the start of the 1892 season.)	pneumonia	1892	
Tom O'Brien	27	Outfielder	Pittsburgh Pirates	pneumonia	1901	
Steve Olin	27	Pitcher	Cleveland Indians	boat crash (see Tim Crews)	1993	
Doc Powers	38	Catcher	Philadelphia Athletics	peritonitis arising from surgery complications following an in-game injury; alternatively, intussusception (see article)	1909	
Frank Ringo	26	Catcher	Kansas City Cowboys (Note: Ringo had last played in the minor Western Association in 1888 but was under contract with Kansas City when he died before the 1889 season.)	suicide by morphine overdose	1889	
Jimmy Sebring	27	Outfielder	Washington Senators	Bright's disease	1909	
Ralph Sharman	23	Outfielder	Philadelphia A's (Note: Sharman was one of eight one-time Major League Baseball players known either to have been killed or died from illness while serving in the armed forces during World War I, but the only one who went directly from a major league career (concluding the 1917 season with the A's) to the military.)	drowned while in military training	1918	
Mike Sharperson	34	Infielder	San Diego Padres (Note: Technically, Sharperson was still a minor league player at the time of his death. The Padres had summoned Sharperson to join the major league team, to be on hand if he were needed in the event of an injury. (Sharperson died on the journey.) However, he had not been activated as a major league player at the time of his death, and quite possibly might not have been activated even had he arrived safely. Sharperson had last been on a major league roster with the Atlanta Braves in 1995.)	automobile crash	1996	
Tyler Skaggs	27	Pitcher	Los Angeles Angels	pulmonary aspiration	2019	
Len Sowders	27	Outfielder	Baltimore Orioles	typhoid malaria	1888	
Chick Stahl	34	Outfielder	Boston Red Sox	suicide by poisoning (carbolic acid)	1907	
Dernell Stenson	25	Outfielder	Cincinnati Reds	homicide by firearm	2003	
Alan Storke	25	Infielder	Cincinnati Reds	general streptococcus due to empyema	1910	
Chub Sullivan	25	First baseman	Worcester Worcesters	tuberculosis	1881	
Sy Sutcliffe	30	Catcher	Baltimore Orioles	Bright's disease	1893	
Oscar Taveras	22	Outfielder	St. Louis Cardinals	automobile crash (driving while intoxicated)	2014	
Jack Taylor	26	Pitcher	Cincinnati Reds	nephritis	1900	
Al Thake	22	Outfielder	Brooklyn Atlantics	drowned while fishing	1872	
Danny Thompson	29	Shortstop	Texas Rangers	leukemia	1976	
Jim Umbricht	33	Pitcher	Houston Colt .45s	melanoma	1964	
Yordano Ventura	25	Pitcher	Kansas City Royals	automobile crash	2017	
Dick Wantz	25	Pitcher	California Angels	brain tumor	1965	
Elmer White	22	Outfielder	Cleveland Forest Citys	tuberculosis	1872	
Don Wilson	29	Pitcher	Houston Astros	poisoning by carbon monoxide	1975	
Cliff Young	29	Pitcher	Cleveland Indians	automobile crash	1993	
Ross Youngs^{†}	30	Outfielder	New York Giants	Bright's disease	1927	

==== Former major-league players still active in professional baseball at the time of their death ====
Player	Age	Position	Last MLB team	Last pro team	Cause of death	Year	Ref(s)
John Ake	25	Third baseman	Baltimore Orioles	Duluth Freezers	drowning	1887	
Francisco Barrios	28	Pitcher	Chicago White Sox	Free agent (Note: Barrios was a free agent at the time of his death, although he was reportedly about to sign a contract with the Milwaukee Brewers on the day he died. He had last been on a major league roster in 1981, with the Chicago White Sox.)	heart attack	1982	
Cy Blanton	37	Pitcher	Philadelphia Phillies	Hollywood Stars	cirrhosis	1945	
Walt Bond	29	Outfielder	Minnesota Twins	Jacksonville Suns (Note: Bond, who had been diagnosed with leukemia in 1962, had been playing with the Minnesota Twins until he was released on May 15, 1967. He was picked up by the Jacksonville Suns, the triple-A team of the New York Mets, but only played three games with Jacksonville before he had to enter a hospital for treatment. He died September 14.)	leukemia	1967	
José Castillo	37	Infielder	Houston Astros	Cardenales de Lara	homicide during attempted highway robbery (vehicular homicide) (with Luis Valbuena)	2018	
Andújar Cedeño	31	Shortstop	Houston Astros	Azucareros del Este	automobile crash	2000	
Tiny Chaplin	33	Pitcher	Boston Bees	San Diego Padres	automobile crash	1939	
Néstor Chávez	21	Pitcher	San Francisco Giants	Phoenix Giants	plane crash	1969	
Forrest Crawford	26	Shortstop	St. Louis Cardinals	Providence Grays	complications from surgery	1908	
Woody Crowson	28	Pitcher	Philadelphia Athletics	Greensboro Patriots	automobile crash (bus)	1947	
Jay Dahl	19	Pitcher	Houston Colt .45s	Salisbury Astros	automobile crash	1965	
Frankie de la Cruz	37	Pitcher	Milwaukee Brewers	Algodoneros de Unión Laguna	heart attack	2021	
Miguel del Toro	29	Pitcher	San Francisco Giants	Seibu Lions	automobile crash	2001	
Joe DeSa	27	First baseman	Chicago White Sox	Ponce Lions	automobile crash	1986	
Bo Díaz	37	Catcher	Cincinnati Reds	Leones del Caracas	crushed by a falling satellite dish	1990	
John Dodge	27	Third baseman	Cincinnati Reds	Mobile Sea Gulls	struck on the head by a pitch	1916	
Mario Encarnación	30	Outfielder	Chicago Cubs	Macoto Cobras	congenital disorder	2005	
Howie Fox	34	Pitcher	Baltimore Orioles	San Antonio Missions	homicide by stabbing	1955	
Rosman García	32	Pitcher	Texas Rangers	Tigres de Aragua	automobile crash	2011	
John Gilroy	21	Pitcher	Washington Senators	Norfolk Jewels	unknown illness	1897	
Geremi González	33	Pitcher	Milwaukee Brewers	Yomiuri Giants	lightning strike	2008	
Miguel Alfredo González	34	Pitcher	Philadelphia Phillies	Free agent	automobile crash	2017	
Herb Gorman	28	Left fielder	St. Louis Cardinals	San Diego Padres	cardiac arrest	1953	
George Grosart	22	Left fielder	Boston Beaneaters	Toledo Mud Hens (Note: Grosart signed with the Toledo Mud Hens prior to the 1902 season and was with them during spring training; he had last played for the Dayton Old Soldiers during the 1901 season.)	typhoid fever	1902	
Tommy Hanson	29	Pitcher	Los Angeles Angels	Sacramento River Cats	organ failure related to cocaine toxicity	2015	
Chris Hartje	31	Catcher	Brooklyn Dodgers	Spokane Indians	automobile crash (bus)	1946	
Dixie Howell	40	Pitcher	Chicago White Sox	Indianapolis Indians	heart attack	1960	
Pat Hynes	23	Outfielder	St. Louis Browns	Milwaukee Brewers	homicide	1907	
Lou Jackson	33	Outfielder	Baltimore Orioles	Sankei Atoms	pancreatic necrosis	1969	
Henry Krug	31	Outfielder	Philadelphia Phillies	Indianapolis Indians (Note: Krug last played for the Indianapolis Indians in 1907 but was under contract with the minor league Johnstown Johnnies at the time of his death in January 1908.)	pneumonia	1908	
John LeRoy	26	Pitcher	Atlanta Braves	Sioux City Explorers	heart attack and brain aneurysm	2001	
José Lima	37	Pitcher	New York Mets	Aguilas Cibaenas	heart attack	2010	
Andy Marte	33	Infielder	Arizona Diamondbacks	KT Wiz	automobile crash	2017	
Dan McGann	39	First baseman	New York Giants	Milwaukee Brewers	suicide by firearm	1910	
Reyes Moronta	31	Pitcher	Los Angeles Angels	Bravos de León	automobile crash	2024	
José Oliva	26	Third baseman	St. Louis Cardinals	Brother Elephants	automobile crash	1997	
Jiggs Parrott	26	Third baseman	Chicago Colts	Dubuque Westerns	tuberculosis	1898	
Clare Patterson	25	Outfielder	Cincinnati Reds	Oakland Oaks	tuberculosis	1913	
Charlie Peete	27	Outfielder	St. Louis Cardinals	Omaha Cardinals	plane crash	1956	
Nick Reeder	27	Third baseman	Louisville Colonels	Peoria Distillers	"brain fever"	1894	
Jim Ritz	22	Third baseman	Pittsburgh Pirates	Washington Little Senators	typhoid fever	1896	
Kenny Robinson	29	Pitcher	Toronto Blue Jays	AZL Diamondbacks	automobile crash	1999	
Chico Ruiz	33	Infielder	California Angels	Salt Lake City Angels	automobile crash	1972	
Jim Rogers	27	First baseman	Louisville Colonels	Norwich Witches	unknown	1900	
Bill Smiley	27–28	Second baseman	Baltimore Orioles	Richmond Virginias	rheumatism	1884	
Bill Smith	20–21	Outfielder	Cleveland Blues	Toronto Canucks	spinal injury from diving accident	1886	
Ed Somerville	24	Second baseman	Louisville Grays	London Tecumsehs	pulmonary hemorrhage	1877	
William Suero	29	Second baseman	Milwaukee Brewers	Free agent	automobile crash	1995	
Luis Valbuena	33	Infielder	Los Angeles Angels	Cardenales de Lara	homicide during attempted highway robbery (vehicular homicide) (with José Castillo)	2018	
Daniel Webb	28	Relief pitcher	Chicago White Sox	Free agent	all-terrain vehicle crash	2017	
Denny Williams	32	Center fielder	Boston Red Sox	Portland Beavers	automobile crash	1929	
Charlie Ziegler	29	Infielder	Philadelphia Phillies	Sioux City Soos (Note: Ziegler had last played in 1903 for the Helena Senators and Seattle Siwashes but was under contract with Sioux City at the time of his death before the start of the 1904 season.)	typhoid fever	1904	

=== Minor League Baseball ===
Players in this section did not play above the Minor League Baseball level; they are listed with their final minor-league team along with its major-league affiliation, if any.

Player	Age	Position	Last team	Organization	Cause of death	Year	Ref(s)
Malcom Anderson	23	Third baseman	San Francisco Haverlys	—	cardiac arrest	1888	
Alexeis Azuaje	21	Second baseman	Clearwater Threshers	Philadelphia Phillies	automobile crash	2023	
Gerik Baxter	21	Pitcher	Fort Wayne Wizards	San Diego Padres	automobile crash	2001	
Jesse Batterton	19	Second baseman	Springfield Cardinals	St. Louis Cardinals	struck on the head by a pitch	1933	
Stan Bell	23	Pitcher	Shreveport Braves	Atlanta Braves	automobile crash	1970	
Randy Burden	23	Pitcher	Provo Angels	Los Angeles Angels	heart attack	2002	
Thomas Burke	26	Left fielder	Lynn Shoemakers	—	struck on the head by a pitch	1906	
Jairo Capellan	19	Pitcher	DSL Reds	Cincinnati Reds	automobile crash	2018	
Bobby Joe Case	24	Infielder	Mobile Bears	New York Mets	automobile crash	1962	
Evan Chambers	24	Outfielder	GCL Pirates	Pittsburgh Pirates	heart defect	2013	
Louis Chedo	23	Pitcher	Decatur Commodores	—	struck on the head by a pitch	1925	
Thomas Coates	—	Outfielder	Oshkosh Indians	—	unintentional discharge of firearm	1909	
William Coffey	22	Pitcher	Pampa Oilers	—	automobile crash	1951	
Brian Cole	22	Outfielder	Scottsdale Scorpions	New York Mets	automobile crash	2001	
Dick Conway	19	Catcher	Twin Falls Cowboys	New York Yankees	struck in the heart by a thrown ball	1951	
Ryan Costello	23	Infielder	Pensacola Blue Wahoos	Minnesota Twins	sudden cardiac arrhythmia	2019	
Aaron Cox	24	Pitcher	Inland Empire 66ers	Los Angeles Angels	suicide by firearm	2018	
James Davis	20	Outfielder	Ballinger Cats	—	struck on the head by a pitch	1947	
Linus Ebnet	23	Shortstop	Winnipeg Maroons	—	struck on the head by a pitch	1938	
Alfredo Edmead	17	Outfielder	Salem Pirates	Pittsburgh Pirates	brain trauma from in-game outfield collision	1974	
Lute Freeland	28	Pitcher	New Orleans Pelicans	—	blood poisoning	1902	
Ronny Garcia	24	Pitcher	York Revolution	—	automobile crash	2024	
Miguel Gonzalez	21	Pitcher	DSL Orioles	Baltimore Orioles	automobile crash	2017	
Luis Guevara	19	Infielder	FCL Orioles	Baltimore Orioles	personal watercraft crash	2025	
Louis Henke	—	First baseman	Atlanta Atlantas	—	internal bleeding from a collision on the base path	1885	
Red Herbert	18	First baseman	Dayton Veterans	—	internal bleeding from a collision on the base path	1904	
Jeff Hoffman	24	Pitcher	Albany-Colonie Yankees	New York Yankees	heart failure	1992	
Happy Hogan	37	Catcher / Manager	Vernon Tigers	—	pneumonia	1915	
Ossie Johnson	—	Outfielder	Oakland Oaks	—	blood poisoning	1924	
Ottis Johnson	24	Outfielder	Dothan Browns	—	struck on the head by a pitch	1951	
Yorman Landa	22	Pitcher	Fort Myers Miracle	Minnesota Twins	automobile crash	2016	
Anthony Latham	21	Outfielder	Winston-Salem Red Sox	Boston Red Sox	boat accident	1983	
Pete Mann	27	Third baseman	Macon Peaches	—	struck in the chest by a pitch	1927	
Andres Melendez	20	Catcher	Lynchburg Hillcats	Cleveland Guardians	Multiple organ failure	2021	
Loek van Mil	34	Pitcher	Rochester Red Wings	Minnesota Twins	head injury following hiking accident	2019	
Doug Million	21	Pitcher	New Haven Ravens	Colorado Rockies	asthma attack	1997	
Sean Murphy	27	Pitcher	Sacramento River Cats	Oakland Athletics	hypertrophic cardiomyopathy	2016	
Ernest Nichols	22	Pitcher	Spokane Indians	—	cardiac arrest	1903	
Chace Numata	27	Catcher	Erie SeaWolves	Detroit Tigers	injuries sustained in skateboarding accident	2019	
Bob Osgood	19	Catcher	Marion Cubs	Chicago Cubs	cardiac arrest	1948	
Corey Phelan	20	Relief pitcher	FCL Phillies	Philadelphia Phillies	T-cell Acute Lymphoblastic Leukemia (T-ALL)	2022	
Charles Pinkney	20	Second baseman	Dayton Veterans	—	struck on the head by a pitch	1909	
Billy Rakes	24	Third baseman	Reidsville Luckies	—	automobile crash	1953	
Ernest Regenold	25	Pitcher	Springfield Senators	—	cardiac arrest and heat stroke	1926	
Russell Reynolds	24	Catcher	Huntington Red Birds	—	struck on the head by a pitch	1935	
Lionel Rodgers	21	Utility	Fresno Giants	San Francisco Giants	automobile crash	1961	
Ronaldo Romero	19	Pitcher	Gastonia Rangers	Texas Rangers	cardiomyopathy, Supac use was a contributing factor	1990	
Victor Sanchez	20	Pitcher	Leones del Caracas	Seattle Mariners	struck by a boat while swimming	2015	
Fausto Segura	23	Pitcher	Auburn Doubledays	Washington Nationals	motorcycle crash	2020	
Bill Seinsoth	22	First baseman	Bakersfield Dodgers	Los Angeles Dodgers	automobile crash	1969	
Leo Smith	19	Third baseman	Kokomo Wild Cats	—	internal bleeding from a collision on the base path	1909	
Mac Smith	23	Infielder	Hagerstown Packets	Washington Senators	cardiac arrest	1954	
Andy Strong	24	Center fielder	Crowley Millers	—	lightning strike during game	1951	
George Tkach	21	Second baseman	Superior Blues	—	struck on the head by a pitch	1936	
Casey Thomas	24	Infielder	Arizona League Athletics	Oakland Athletics	painkiller overdose	2017	
Charles Uhas	29	Infielder	Greensboro Patriots	Chicago White Sox (Note: Uhas' last experience in minor league baseball came in 1934 with the Greensboro Patriots, an affiliate of the St. Louis Cardinals. He played with semi-pro teams in 1935, but caught on with the Chicago White Sox in the spring of 1936. However, he was sent home during spring training due to illness, never playing in a regular season game for the White Sox. He died in Chicago on May 8.)	pneumonia	1936	
Herbert Whitney	27	Catcher	Burlington Pathfinders	—	struck on the head by a pitch	1906	
Lefty Wycoff	—	Pitcher	Canton Terriers	—	struck by automobile	1929	

=== Nippon Professional Baseball ===
Player	Age	Position	Team	Cause of death	Year	Ref(s)
Masao Fujii	31	Pitcher	Fukuoka Daiei Hawks	lung cancer	2000	
Yūsuke Kinoshita	27	Pitcher	Chunichi Dragons	myocarditis	2021	
Toshio Kurosawa	33	Outfielder	Yomiuri Giants	typhoid fever	1947	
Hiroyuki Oze	24	Outfielder	Orix Buffaloes	suicide by jumping from height	2010	

=== KBO League ===
Player	Age	Position	Team	Cause of death	Year	Ref(s)
Dae-Hyeon Kim (pitcher, born 1962)	26	Pitcher	Haitai Tigers	automobile crash	1988	
Sang-Jin Kim (pitcher, born 1977)	22	Pitcher	Haitai Tigers	stomach cancer	1999	
Sung-Hun Kim (pitcher, born 1998)	21	pitcher	Hanwha Eagles	fall from a building	2019	
Young-Sin Kim (baseball)	24	Catcher	OB Bears	drowning suspected to be suicide	1986	
Braulio Lara	30	Pitcher	SK Wyverns	automobile crash	2019	
Doo-hwan Lee	24	First baseman	KIA Tigers	osteosarcoma	2012	
Jang-hui Lee (baseball)	24	Infielder	LG Twins	fall near a parking lot	2013	
Kyoo-hwan Lee (baseball)	22	Outfielder	Doosan Bears	fall down the stairs	2012	
Andy Marte	33	Infielder	KT Wiz	automobile crash	2017	

=== Negro leagues ===
Player	Age	Position	Team	Cause of death	Year	Ref(s)
Will Bedford	23	Outfielder	Cuban Giants	lightning strike during baseball practice	1909	
George Fleischman	24	Catcher	Stapleton Baseball Club	struck on the head by a pitch	1908	
John Garcia	28	Catcher	Cuban Giants	cardiac arrest during game	1904	
Josh Gibson^{†}	35	Catcher	Homestead Grays	brain tumor and stroke	1947	
Clifford Larkins	21	Catcher	Zulu Cannibal Giants	struck on the throat by a pitch	1937	
José Leblanc	28	Pitcher	Cuban Stars	homicide, hit on the head by a bat during an in-game argument	1922	
Porter Moss	34	Pitcher	Memphis Red Sox	homicide, gunshot	1944	
Ben Myers	19–20	Catcher	Southern Star Baseball Club	struck on the neck by a passed ball	1890	
Pythias Russ	26	Catcher	Chicago American Giants	tuberculosis	1930	
Clyde Nelson	32	Infielder	Indianapolis Clowns	cardiac arrest during game	1949	
Chino Smith	30	Outfielder	Lincoln Giants	yellow fever	1932	
Frank Warfield	35	Second baseman / manager	Washington Pilots	heart attack	1932	
George Washington	34	Pitcher	Philadelphia Giants	cardiac arrest	1908	
Charlie Williams	27	Shortstop	Chicago American Giants	ptomaine poisoning	1931	

=== Pre-professional baseball ===
Player	Age	Position	Team	Cause of death	Year	Ref(s)
Jim Creighton	21	Pitcher	Brooklyn Excelsiors	strangulated intestine caused by an inguinal hernia	1862	

=== Dutch League Baseball ===
Player	Age	Position	Team	Cause of death	Year	Ref(s)
Hartog Hamburger	37	Infielder	OVVO	struck on the head by a line drive ball	1924	

=== College baseball ===
Player	Age	Position	Team	Cause of death	Year	Ref(s)
Sang Ho Baek	20	Pitcher	George Mason	blood clot from complications from Tommy John surgery	2021	
Curtis Brenneman	17	Second baseman	Gettysburg	struck on the head by a pitch	1926	
Derek Becker	21	Middle infielder	Keiser	homicide, gunshot	2020	
Chris Lane	22	Catcher	East Central	homicide, gunshot	2013	
Robert Brown	19	unknown	Howard County JC	electrocuted while erecting a foul pole that fell on a powerline	1953	
Randy Collins	22	Pitcher / Outfielder	Vanderbilt	automobile crash	1973	
Donny Everett	19	Pitcher	Vanderbilt	drowned	2016	
Joseph Geddings	20	Catcher	Appalachian State	struck on the head by a pitch	1964	
Ira Goodlet	18	unknown	Arkansas Cumberland	struck on the head by a pitch	1908	
James Mair	—	Second baseman	Monmouth	cerebral hemorrhage, collided with a teammate	1896	
Hervey Mangham	19	Right fielder	Louisiana State	struck on the head by a pitch	1908	
Drew Medford	18	Pitcher	TCU	automobile crash	2016	
Cassel Mowrey	21	First baseman	West Virginia	struck on the head by a pitch	1923	
Gene Reynolds	18	unknown	Howard County JC	electrocuted while erecting a foul pole that fell on a powerline	1953	
Tim Trunk	19	Pitcher	Bradley	automobile crash	1989	
Kyle Valentine	21	Pitcher	Hartford	brain aneurysm	2004	
Walter Zorn	19	unknown	St. John's (Kansas)	struck on the head by a pitch	1950	

== See also ==
- Lou Gehrig – New York Yankees's first baseman who was forced into retirement after being diagnosed with ALS; he ultimately died from the disease two years later in 1941.
- Sportspeople who died during their careers
- List of Major League Baseball players who died in wars

== Sources ==
- Abrunzo, Thomas (1991), "Commotio Cordis: The Single, Most Common Cause of Traumatic Death in Youth Baseball", American Journal of Diseases of Children, 145 (11): 1279–1282, doi:10.1001/archpedi.1991.02160110071023, PMID 1951221, S2CID 31217442
- Gorman, Robert; Weeks, David (2009), Death at the Ballpark: A Comprehensive Study of Game-related Fatalities of Players, Other Personnel and Spectators in Amateur and Professional Baseball, 1862–2007 (Kindle ed.), McFarland, ISBN 978-0786434350
- Lawless, Molly (2012), Hit by Pitch: Ray Chapman, Carl Mays and the Fatal Fastball, McFarland, ISBN 9780786484843
- Lennox, Doug (2010), Now You Know Baseball, Dundurn, ISBN 9781770705883
- Light, Jonathan (2005), "Deaths", The Cultural Encyclopedia of Baseball, McFarland & Company, pp. 246–250, ISBN 0-7864-2087-1
- Saint Onge, Jarron; Rogers, Richard; Krueger, Patrick (July 17, 2008), "Major League Baseball Players' Life Expectancies", Social Science Quarterly, 89 (3): 817–830, doi:10.1111/j.1540-6237.2008.00562.x, PMC 2743321, PMID 19756205
