= Donny Everett =

American baseball player (1997–2016)

- Pitcher
- Born: April 16, 1997; Clarksville, Tennessee, U.S.
- Died: June 2, 2016 (aged 19); Manchester, Tennessee, U.S.
- Batted: Right Threw: Right
- Stats at Baseball Reference

Donald Edward Everett (April 16, 1997 – June 2, 2016) was an American baseball pitcher. He attended Vanderbilt University, where he played college baseball for the Vanderbilt Commodores. He was considered one of the top prospects for the 2015 Major League Baseball draft. Everett drowned during his freshman season at Vanderbilt.

== Career ==
Everett attended Clarksville High School in Clarksville, Tennessee. As a junior, he had an 11–1 win–loss record with a 0.61 earned run average (ERA) and 105 strikeouts. As a senior, he was the Gatorade Baseball Player of the Year for Tennessee. For the season, he had a 9–1 record with a 0.93 ERA and 124 strikeouts. He also batted .412 with two home runs and 34 runs batted in. He committed to Vanderbilt University to play college baseball.

Everett was considered one of the top prospects for the 2015 Major League Baseball draft. Due to a reported signing bonus demand of "more than $2 million", Everett was not selected until the Milwaukee Brewers chose him in the 29th round, with the 871st overall selection. Everett turned down signing bonus offers reportedly as high as $2.5 million from teams who decided against drafting him so that he could attend Vanderbilt.

Everett missed the first half of his freshman season with an injury. When he returned, he pitched to a 1.50 ERA in 12 innings pitched.

== Death ==
Everett went fishing at Normandy Lake in Manchester, Tennessee, with his Vanderbilt teammates on the night of June 2, 2016. Everett tried to swim across the lake and drowned. According to Coffee County Sheriff’s Department, Everett had called for help to his friends, who thought he was “just joking around because he was smiling and did not seem to be in distress”. Emergency crews were called to the scene around 5:00 pm. He was later pronounced dead. He was 19. Having just finished his freshman year, he died one day before Vanderbilt University was to enter the 2016 NCAA Division I baseball tournament.

== See also ==
- List of baseball players who died during their careers
