= Luis Valbuena =

Venezuelan baseball player (1985–2018)

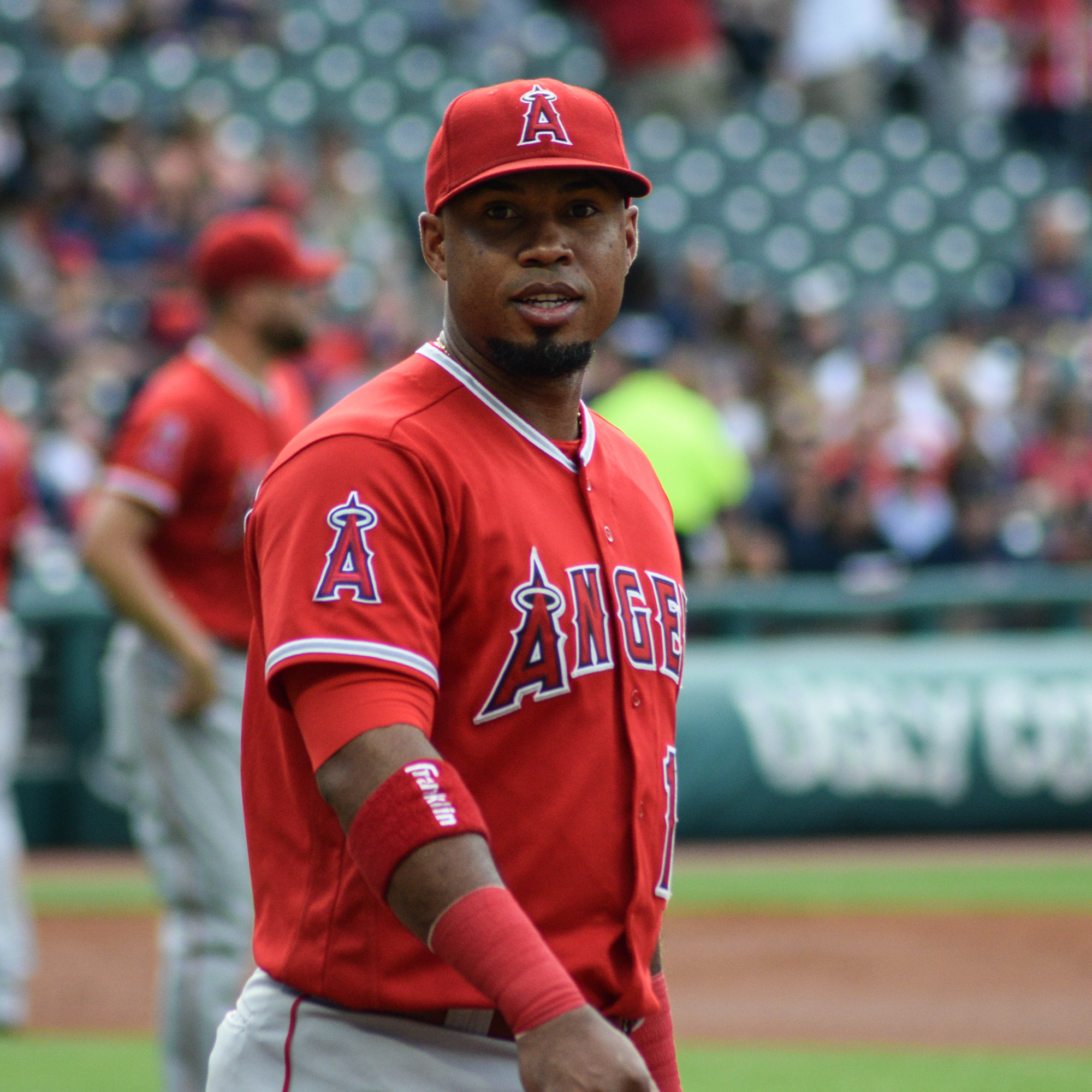
- Valbuena with the Los Angeles Angels in 2017
- Infielder
- Born: November 30, 1985; Caja Seca, Venezuela
- Died: December 6, 2018 (aged 33); Cocorote Municipality, Yaracuy, Venezuela
- Batted: Left Threw: Right

MLB debut
- September 2, 2008, for the Seattle Mariners

Last MLB appearance
- August 3, 2018, for the Los Angeles Angels

MLB statistics
- Batting average: .226
- Home runs: 114
- Runs batted in: 367
- Stats at Baseball Reference

Teams
- Seattle Mariners (2008); Cleveland Indians (2009–2011); Chicago Cubs (2012–2014); Houston Astros (2015–2016); Los Angeles Angels (2017–2018)

Luis Adan Valbuena (November 30, 1985 – December 6, 2018) was a Venezuelan professional baseball infielder. He played eleven seasons in Major League Baseball (MLB), from 2008 through 2018, for the Seattle Mariners, Cleveland Indians, Chicago Cubs, Houston Astros, and Los Angeles Angels. While primarily a third baseman, Valbuena also played second base and first base. He was killed alongside José Castillo in a 2018 car crash in Venezuela caused by bandits in an attempted robbery.

== Early life ==
Valbuena grew up in Sucre, a municipality in the Venezuelan state of Zulia. He was raised by a single mother named Nelly, who was the president of the local youth baseball league. Valbuena's older brother and several uncles helped him learn to play baseball.

== Professional career ==
=== Seattle Mariners ===
Valbuena began his professional career in the Seattle Mariners organization in 2005. He was first promoted to the major leagues on September 1, 2008, from the Mariners' Triple-A team, the Tacoma Rainiers.

=== Cleveland Indians ===
On December 10, 2008, Valbuena was traded to the Cleveland Indians in a three-team trade that sent Franklin Gutiérrez to Seattle. Valbuena hit his first major league home run off of Bartolo Colón on June 7, 2009.

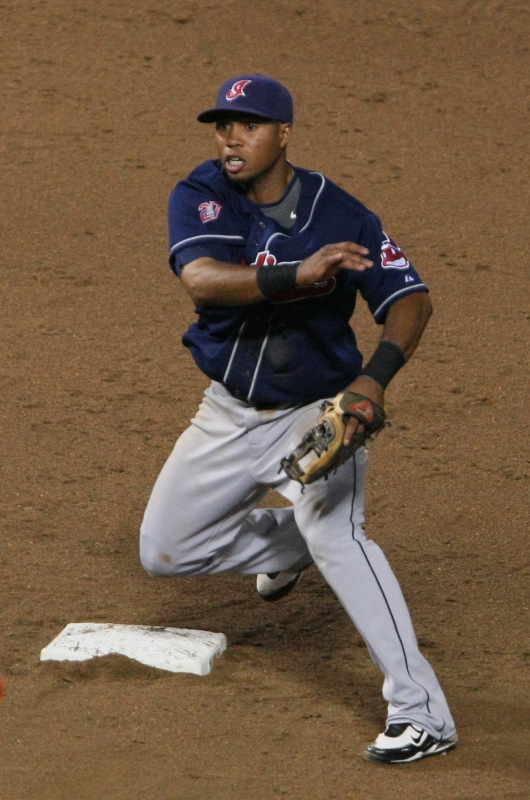
Valbuena in 2011

In July 2011, the Indians optioned Valbuena to Triple-A Columbus, to make room for the promotion of rookie second baseman Jason Kipnis. In August 2011, Valbuena was recalled after Kipnis was put on the disabled list with an oblique injury. He was designated for assignment and removed from the 40-man roster on November 18. On November 26, he was traded to the Toronto Blue Jays for cash considerations.

=== Chicago Cubs ===
On April 4, 2012, Valbuena was claimed off waivers by the Chicago Cubs after being optioned by the Blue Jays. He was outrighted to the minors on April 7. Valbuena was called up from the Triple-A Iowa Cubs on June 14.

Valbuena played 108 games for Chicago in 2013, hitting .218 with 12 home runs and 37 runs batted in (RBIs). The next year, Valbuena's batting average increased to .249 over 149 games and he had 16 home runs and 51 RBIs. By June 2014, Fangraphs noted that Valbuena was hitting fastballs well in the lower, outer portions of the strike zone, which had been a weakness for him in previous years.

=== Houston Astros ===
On January 19, 2015, the Cubs traded Valbuena and Dan Straily to the Houston Astros for Dexter Fowler. At the time of the trade, Valbuena was projected as the Astros' starting third baseman for 2015. Valbuena's average dropped to .224 in 2015, but he set a career-high with 25 home runs. With Jed Lowrie coming off the disabled list and Carlos Correa taking over the primary shortstop position, Valbuena was forced to share some of the first base duties along with Chris Carter and utility player Marwin González in order to get some playing time.

At the beginning of the 2016 season, Valbuena was the starting third baseman for the Astros. He began to split playing time between first and third base. With the call-up of Astros prospect Alex Bregman, Valbuena saw more playing time at first base.

=== Los Angeles Angels ===
On January 24, 2017, Valbuena signed a two-year contract with the Los Angeles Angels. Valbuena split time during the season between third base and first base. He ended the season hitting a career low .199 with 22 home runs and a career-high 65 RBI.

Valbuena was designated for assignment by the Angels on August 5, 2018. He hit .199 for the second straight season, finishing with nine home runs and 33 RBI. He was released on August 7, 2018. For the season, he had the slowest baserunning sprint speed of all major league third basemen, at 24.1 feet/second.

== Death ==
On December 6, 2018, Valbuena, José Castillo, and Carlos Rivero were in a car in Yaracuy driven by Rivero's chauffeur when the group was ambushed by highway robbers. The players were members of Venezuelan winter team Cardenales de Lara, and were returning from a game played on the day of the crash. In the driver's attempt to avoid the robbers the vehicle struck a rock and overturned, killing Valbuena and Castillo. Four men were arrested in connection with the incident after being found in possession of the players' property.

== See also ==
- List of Major League Baseball players from Venezuela
- List of baseball players who died during their careers
