= Hayato Takagi =

Japanese baseball player (born 1989)

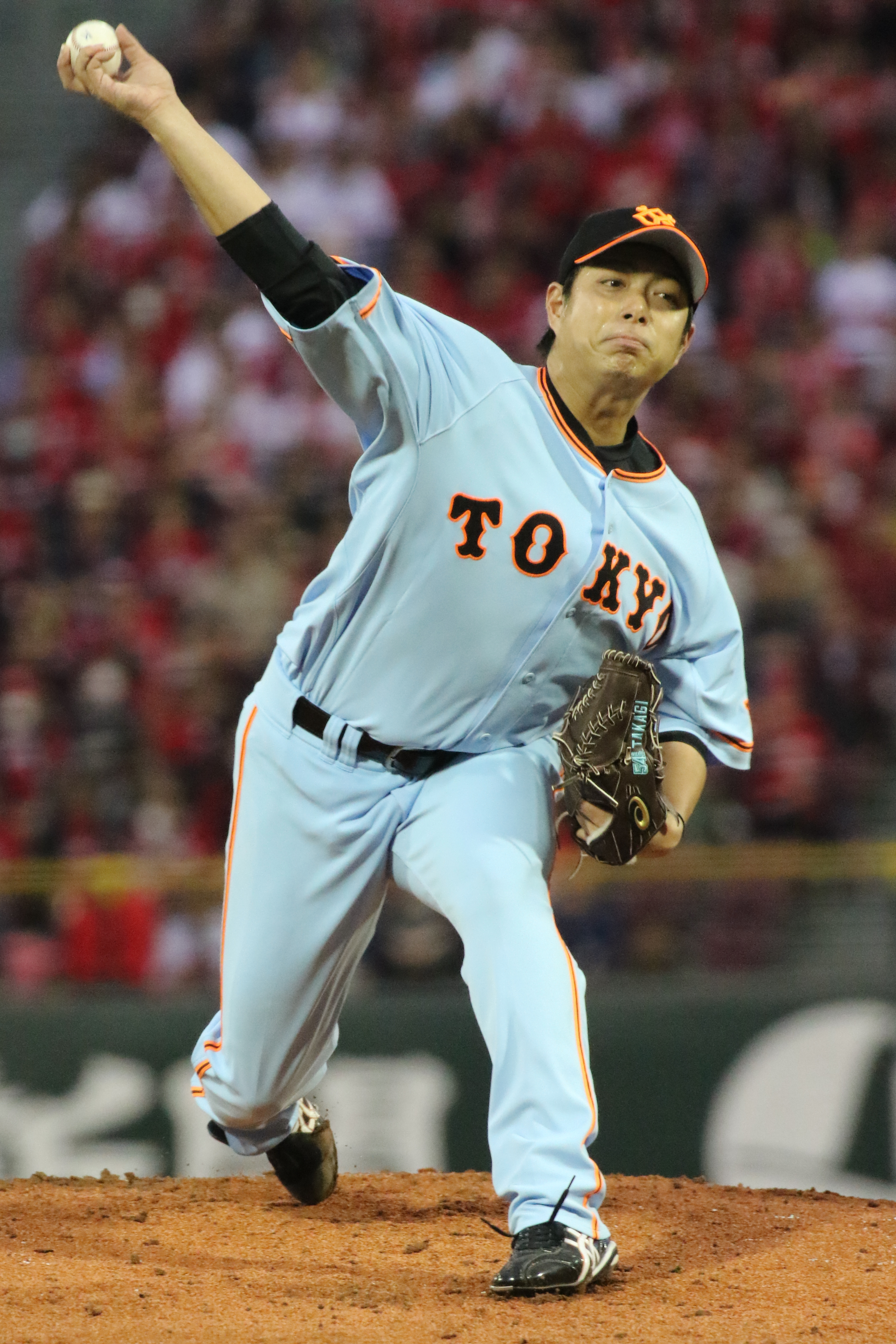
- Takagi with the Yomiuri Giants

Kanagawa Future Dreams – No. 54
- Pitcher
- Born: July 13, 1989 (age 36); Tsu, Mie, Japan
- Bats: Right Throws: Right

NPB debut
- March 29, 2015, for the Yomiuri Giants

NPB statistics (through 2019 season)
- Win–loss record: 16–23
- Earned run average: 3.90
- Strikeouts: 248
- Stats at Baseball Reference

Teams
- Yomiuri Giants (2015–2017); Saitama Seibu Lions (2018–2019)

Hayato Takagi (高木 勇人, Takagi Hayato; born July 13, 1989) is a Japanese professional baseball pitcher for the Kanagawa Future Dreams of the Baseball Challenge League (BCL). He has previously played in Nippon Professional Baseball (NPB) for the Yomiuri Giants and Saitama Seibu Lions.

== Career ==
=== Yomiuri Giants ===
Takagi made his Nippon Professional Baseball debut for the Yomiuri Giants on March 29, 2015. In his debut season, Takagi recorded a 9-10 record and 3.07 ERA in 27 games (26 of them starts). The following season, Takagi pitched in 25 games for Yomiuri, posting a 5-9 record and 4.31 ERA with 91 strikeouts in 117.0 innings of work. In 2017, Takagi made 16 appearances for the Giants, recording a 2.63 ERA with 15 strikeouts in 27.1 innings pitched.

=== Saitama Seibu Lions ===
On December 17, 2017, Takagi was selected by the Saitama Seibu Lions as compensation for Ryoma Nogami's departure in free agency. In 2018, Takagi struggled to an 8.69 ERA with 10 strikeouts in 8 appearances for the club. In 2019, Takagi made 2 appearances for Seibu, but allowed 2 earned runs in 2.1 innings pitched. Takagi became a free agent following the season.

On January 10, 2020, Takagi signed with the Leones de Yucatán of the Mexican League. Takagi did not play in a game in 2020 due to the cancellation of the Mexican League season because of the COVID-19 pandemic. On February 23, 2021, Takagi was released by the Leones.

=== Kanagawa Future Dreams ===
On March 12, 2021, Takagi signed with the Kanagawa Future Dreams of the Baseball Challenge League. On October 4, 2021, Takagi left the team.

=== Rieleros de Aguascalientes ===
On February 2, 2022, Takagi signed with El Águila de Veracruz of the Mexican League. However, he did not make the Opening Day roster, and was later assigned to their affiliate team, the Algodoneros de San Luis of the Liga Norte de México. On May 25, Takagi was traded to the Rieleros de Aguascalientes of the Mexican League. In 8 games (7 starts) for Aguascalientes, he played a 5.54 ERA with 22 strikeouts across 37 1/3 innings pitched.

=== Bravos de León ===
On July 14, 2022, Takagi was traded to the Bravos de León in exchange for IF Carlos Rivero. He made two starts for León, struggling to an 0–2 record and 19.29 ERA with 2 strikeouts across 4 2/3 innings of work. Takagi was released by the Bravos on July 31.

=== Kanagawa Future Dreams (second stint) ===
On January 4, 2023, Takagi returned to the Kanagawa Future Dreams of the Baseball Challenge League as a player and coach.

He was named to the team's Opening Day roster in 2024.
