= Walt Lerian =

American baseball player

Walter Irvin Lerian
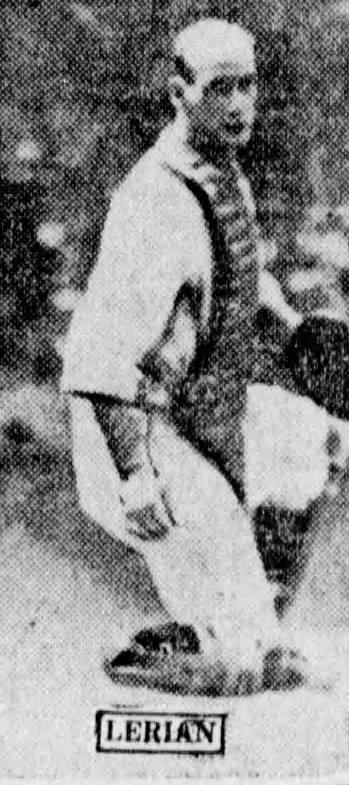
- Catcher
- Born: February 10, 1903; Baltimore, Maryland, U.S.
- Died: October 22, 1929 (aged 26); Baltimore, Maryland, U.S.
- Batted: Right Threw: Right

MLB debut
- April 16, 1928, for the Philadelphia Phillies

Last MLB appearance
- October 5, 1929, for the Philadelphia Phillies

MLB statistics
- Batting average: .246
- Home runs: 8
- Runs batted in: 51
- Stats at Baseball Reference

Teams
- Philadelphia Phillies (1928–1929)

Walter "Peck" Irvin Lerian (February 10, 1903 – October 22, 1929) was an American professional baseball player who played two seasons for the Philadelphia Phillies from 1928 through 1929. He was born in Baltimore, Maryland and died there at the age of 26 when a truck driver leaped the curb and he was pinned against a building, ending what was considered at the time to be a promising major league career. The driver was later convicted of manslaughter.

== See also ==
- List of baseball players who died during their careers
