= Alfredo Edmead =

- Outfielder
- Born: 1956; Santo Domingo, Dominican Republic
- Died: August 22, 1974 (aged 17); Salem, Virginia, U.S.
- Batted: Left Threw: Left

Francisco Alfredo Edmead (1956 – August 22, 1974) was a Dominican minor league baseball player who was killed in a freak on-field accident in 1974.

A native of the Dominican Republic and one of eleven children, Alfredo Edmead joined the Salem Pirates of the Carolina League as a 17-year-old in 1974. Edmead immediately showed promise, batting .314 with 61 stolen bases and seven homers in 119 games with Salem, a farm club of the MLB Pittsburgh Pirates.

Edmead spoke little English, but improved quickly. "I was afraid I'd be withdrawn," he told a reporter early in the season. Salem manager John Lipon was impressed, describing Edmead as "so very smart".

== Death ==
On August 22, 1974, the Pirates were playing the Rocky Mount Phillies at Salem's Municipal Stadium. Opposing pitcher Murray Gage-Cole hit a fly ball to short right field. Edmead gave chase, while teammate, second baseman Pablo Cruz drifted back for the play. Edmead collided with Cruz—who, coincidentally, had signed Edmead to his first pro contract as a part-time scout for the Pirates—striking his head on Cruz's knee, knocking Edmead unconscious. Edmead died an hour later from massive brain trauma and blood loss at Lewis-Gale Hospital in Salem. At the age of 17, Edmead remains the youngest death of any professional baseball player in history.

Phillies pitcher Jim Meerpohl said in an interview with Sporting News that Edmead hit his head on Cruz's knee brace, which was "the old-fashioned kind with steel braces on each side [...] that damned steel had been like an axe to Edmead's head". In a 2021 interview, however, Cruz disputed that his brace had caused the injury, saying that he was wearing a brace on his left knee, but Edmead had hit his head on Cruz's right knee. Howie Haak, the scout who signed Edmead, reported that "the autopsy determined that Edmead had an abnormally thin and fragile cranium".

== See also ==
- List of baseball players who died during their careers
