= Carlos Rivero (baseball) =

Venezuelan baseball player (born 1988)

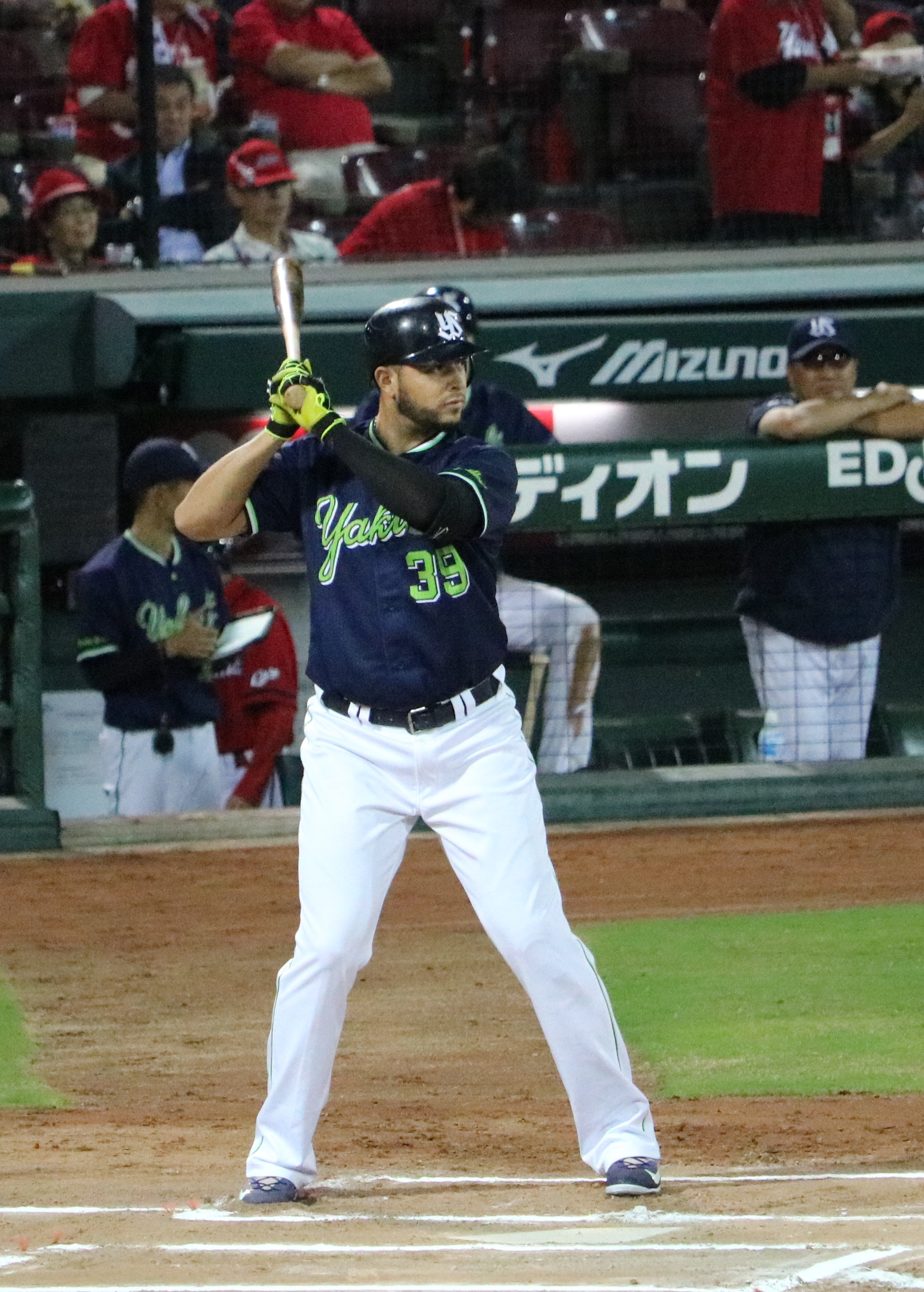
- Rivero playing for the 2017 Tokyo Yakult Swallows
- Third baseman
- Born: May 20, 1988 (age 38); Barquisimeto, Lara, Venezuela
- Batted: Right Threw: Right

Professional debut
- MLB: August 29, 2014, for the Boston Red Sox
- NPB: July 22, 2017, for the Tokyo Yakult Swallows

Last appearance
- MLB: September 27, 2014, for the Boston Red Sox
- NPB: October 1, 2017, for the Tokyo Yakult Swallows

MLB statistics
- Batting average: .571
- Home runs: 1
- Runs batted in: 3

NPB statistics
- Batting average: .215
- Home runs: 6
- Runs batted in: 21
- Stats at Baseball Reference

Teams
- Boston Red Sox (2014); Tokyo Yakult Swallows (2017)

Carlos Luis Rivero Milán (born May 20, 1988) is a Venezuelan former professional baseball third baseman. He played in Major League Baseball (MLB) for the Boston Red Sox, and in Nippon Professional Baseball (NPB) for the Tokyo Yakult Swallows.

Rivero was originally signed by the Cleveland Indians as an international free agent in 2005, and played for them for five minor league seasons (2006–2010) before joining the Philadelphia Phillies (2011) and Washington Nationals (2012–2013) organizations. He initially began as a strong-armed shortstop before being moved to third base, and has also spent time in left field. The Red Sox signed him in December 2013.

In between, Rivero played winter baseball for the Leones del Caracas, Bravos de Margarita and Cardenales de Lara clubs of the LVBP.

== Career ==
=== Cleveland Indians ===
The Venezuelan infielder ranked among the 20-top Cleveland prospects from 2007 through 2009. He also was rated twice by Baseball America as having the best infield arm in the Indians organization in the 2008 and 2009 seasons, before being named the best defensive third baseman in the International League in 2012 while playing for Washington affiliate the Syracuse Chiefs.

Rivero earned International League All-Star honors during the 2012 season when he played at Syracuse. Previously, he was named the 2007 South Atlantic League Mid-Season All-Star while playing for the Lake County Captains, also a Cleveland affiliate.

=== Boston Red Sox ===
Not long after signing him, the Red Sox assigned Rivero to Double A Portland Sea Dogs to start the 2014 season. He then gained a promotion to Triple A Pawtucket Red Sox during the midseason. He struggled after being called up to Triple-A, batting just .179 through eight games in the month of May. But Rivero improved the rest of the way, hitting .319 to go along with a .375 on-base percentage in June. He finished the month with a solid week, recording at least a hit in all seven games to be named the International League Batter of the Week. He went 12-for-28 (.429) during the seven-game span, raising his season average to .286. In addition, Rivero drove in five runs and scored six times, while compiling three extra-base hits, as his efforts helped Pawtucket conclude a 5-2 stretch. He often filled the designated hitter role when he was not playing on the field. Overall, he hit .262/.320/.379 with five homers and 36 RBI in 74 games for Pawtucket before joining the Boston Red Sox.

==== Major Leagues ====
After nine seasons in professional baseball, Rivero became a major leaguer when the Red Sox purchased his contract from Pawtucket on August 25, 2014 after placing shortstop Xander Bogaerts on the seven-day concussion disabled list. He made his major league debut on August 29, pinch hitting for Will Middlebrooks. He was walked in his only plate appearance.

=== Seattle Mariners ===
Rivero was claimed off waivers by the Seattle Mariners on November 3, 2014 but on December 2, 2014 he was non-tendered and became a free agent. However, they soon re-signed him to a minor league contract.

=== Second stint with Boston Red Sox ===
On August 9, 2015, Rivero was traded back to the Boston Red Sox for cash and assigned to Triple-A Pawtucket.

=== Arizona Diamondbacks ===
On November 18, 2015, Rivero signed a minor league contract with the Arizona Diamondbacks. He played in 124 games for the Triple–A Reno Aces, hitting .277/.316/.484 with 19 home runs and 72 RBI. Rivero elected free agency following the season on November 7, 2016.

Rivero signed a new minor league contract with the Diamondbacks on January 24, 2017. He was released by Arizona on June 19.

=== Tokyo Yakult Swallows ===
On July 6, 2017, Rivero signed with the Tokyo Yakult Swallows of Nippon Professional Baseball. He became a free agent following the season.

=== Toros de Tijuana ===
On March 20, 2018, Rivero signed with the Toros de Tijuana of the Mexican League. He became a free agent following the season. In 28 games he hit .246/.312/.386 with 3 home runs and 14 RBIs.

=== Bravos de León ===
On April 3, 2019, Rivero signed with the Bravos de León of the Mexican League. In 109 games he hit .336/.404/.567 with 24 home runs and 91 RBIs.

=== Algodoneros de Unión Laguna ===
On February 16, 2020, Rivero was traded to the Algodoneros de Unión Laguna. Rivero did not play in a game in 2020 due to the cancellation of the LMB season because of the COVID-19 pandemic. In 2021, Rivero batted .278/.338/.456 with 11 home runs and 53 RBIs in 65 games. He became a free agent following the season.

=== Bravos de León (second stint) ===
On January 13, 2022, Rivero re-signed with the Bravos de León for the 2022 season. In 66 games he hit .318/.397/.564 with 15 home runs and 56 RBIs.

=== Rieleros de Aguascalientes ===
On July 14, 2022, he was traded to the Rieleros de Aguascalientes in exchange for P Hayato Takagi.

On December 12, 2022, Rivero was traded to the Tecolotes de los Dos Laredos in exchange for Wilfredo Tovar. However, he did not appear in a game for the Tecolotes in 2023.

On January 16, 2024, Rivero was loaned to the Tigres de Quintana Roo of the Mexican League. He was released by Quintana Roo on March 11.

== Accident ==
On December 6, 2018, Rivero, Luis Valbuena, and José Castillo were in a car in Yaracuy driven by Rivero's chauffeur when the group was ambushed by highway robbers. In the driver's attempt to avoid the robbers the vehicle struck a rock and overturned. Rivero and the driver survived, but Castillo and Valbuena, who were not wearing seatbelts, were thrown out of the vehicle and died. Castillo, Rivero, and Valbuena were all members of Venezuelan winter team Cardenales de Lara, and had played a game the day of the accident.

== See also ==
- List of Major League Baseball players from Venezuela
