= Wilfredo Tovar =

Venezuelan baseball player (born 1991)

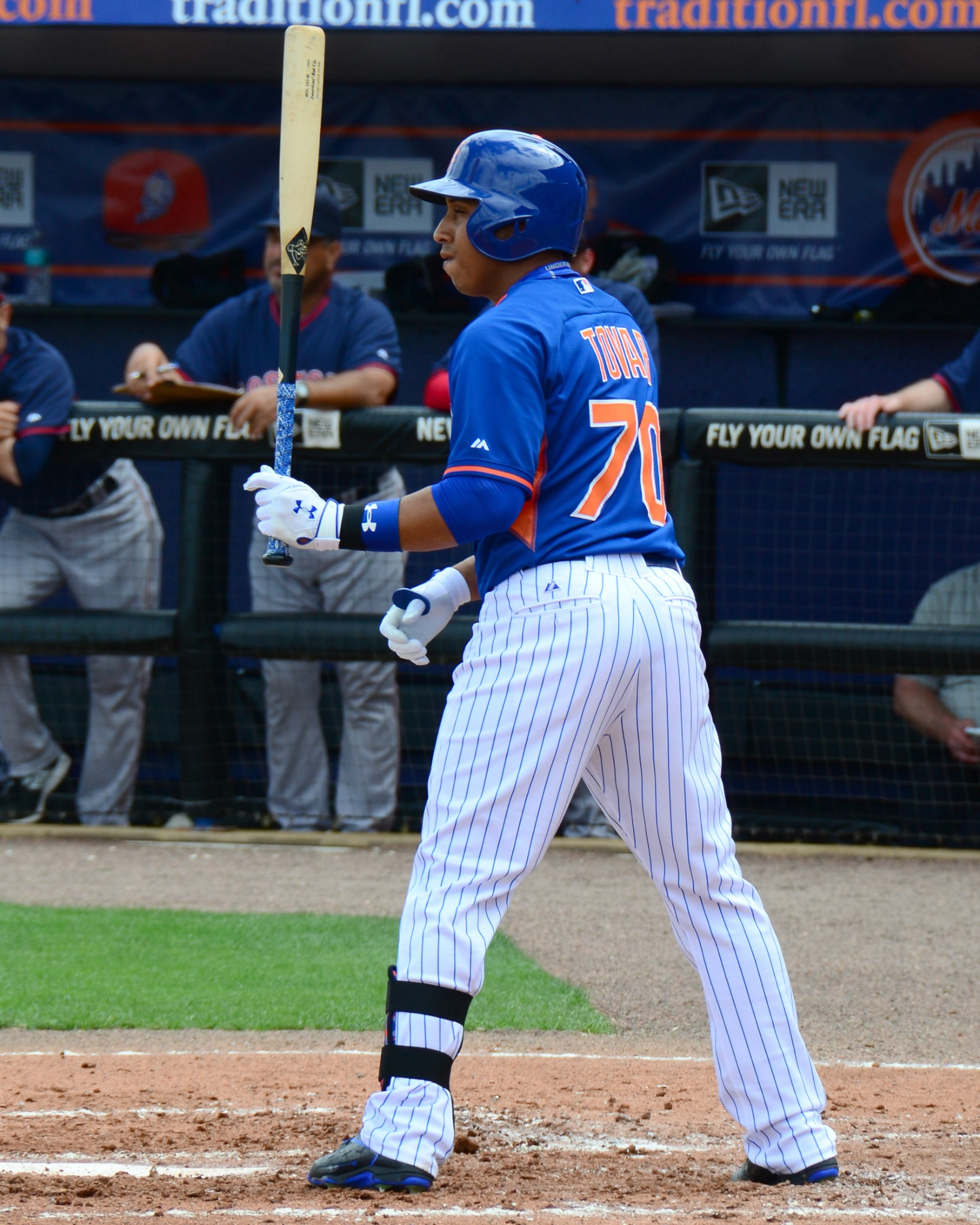
- Tovar with the New York Mets

Leones de Yucatán – No. 52
- Shortstop
- Born: August 11, 1991 (age 35); Santa Teresa del Tuy, Venezuela
- Bats: Right Throws: Right

MLB debut
- September 22, 2013, for the New York Mets

MLB statistics (through 2021 season)
- Batting average: .188
- Home runs: 0
- Runs batted in: 8
- Stats at Baseball Reference

Teams
- New York Mets (2013–2014); Los Angeles Angels (2019); New York Mets (2021)

Wilfredo José Tovar Soto (born August 11, 1991) is a Venezuelan professional baseball shortstop for the Leones de Yucatán of the Mexican League. He has previously played in Major League Baseball (MLB) for the New York Mets and Los Angeles Angels.

== Career ==
=== New York Mets ===
Tovar originally signed with the New York Mets as an international free agent on October 12, 2007, at age 16. He made his professional debut in 2008 with the Venezuelan Summer League Mets, slashing .203/.269/.301 with 2 home runs and 11 RBI. The next year he played for the VSL Mets and the GCL Mets, batting .253/.309/.339 in 50 games between the two teams. In 2010, he split the year between the Low-A Brooklyn Cyclones, Single-A Savannah Sand Gnats, and High-A St. Lucie Mets, posting a .266/.307/.327 batting line in 92 games between the three. He spent the 2011 season in Savannah, slashing .251/.318/.318 with 2 home runs and 41 RBI in 131 games. He split the 2012 season between St. Lucie and the Double-A Binghamton Mets, accumulating a .270/.345/.360 batting line to go along with 1 home run and 50 RBI.

==== 2013 ====
Tovar was called up to the major leagues for the first time from the Class AA Eastern League on September 20 after an injury to the Mets' primary shortstop, Ruben Tejada. He made his major league debut on September 22, going 2–4 with an RBI double. He ended his 2013 season in Binghamton with a .263 average, 14 doubles, 4 triples, 4 home runs, 36 RBI, 70 runs, and 12 stolen bases. With the Mets he batted .200 in 7 games in 15 at-bats with 19 plate appearances with 3 hits, 2 RBIs, 1 run scored, 1 walk, 1 stolen base and 3 strikeouts.

==== 2014 ====
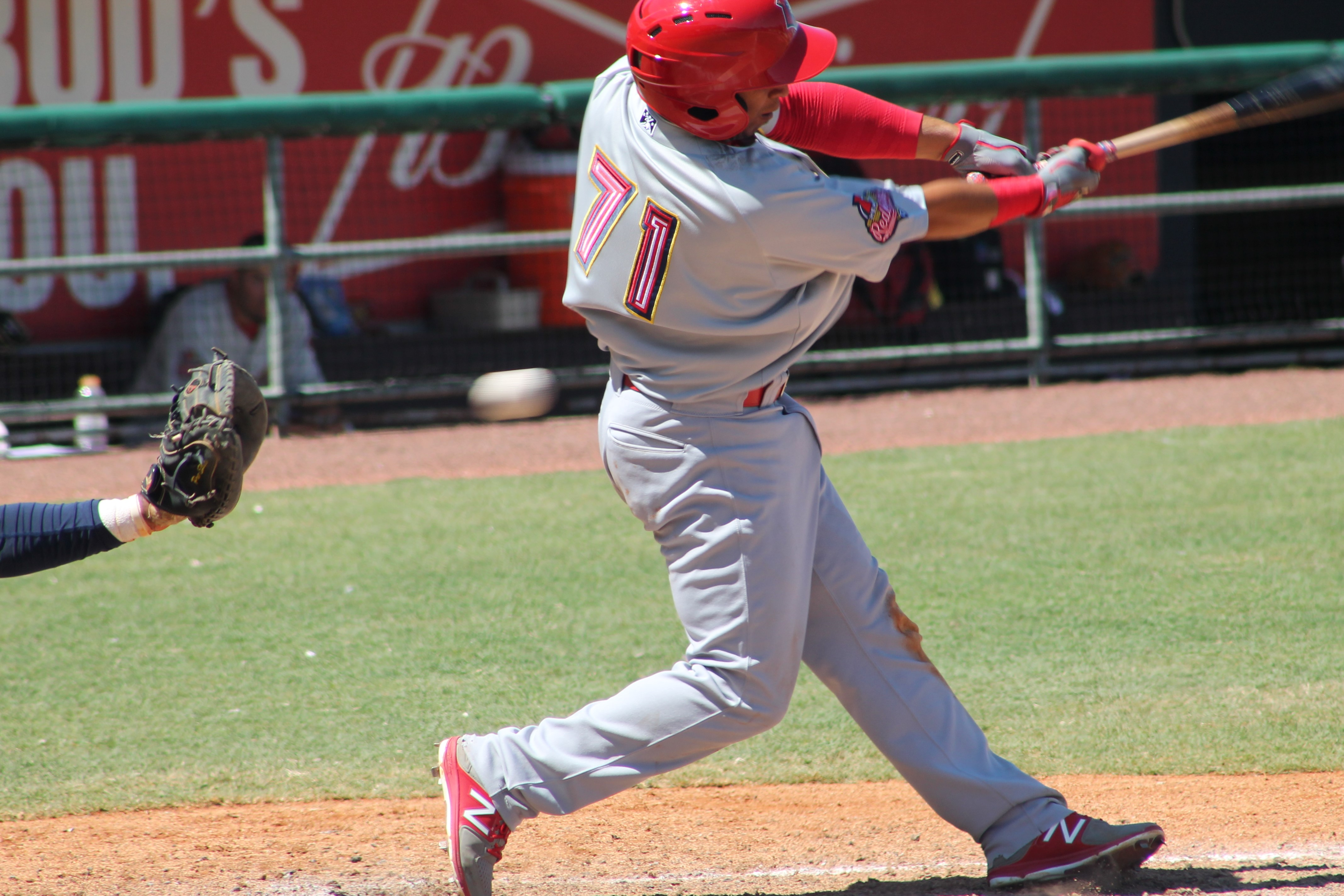
Tovar with the Memphis Redbirds in April 2017

Tovar was assigned to Double-A Binghamton to begin the year. On September 23, Tovar was recalled from the Binghamton, and appeared in 2 games with 3 at-bats in a short period. Tovar spent the majority of the year in 2014 with the Binghamton Mets and the St. Lucie Mets. With Binghamton he batted .282 in 78 games in 255 at-bats with 72 hits, 29 RBIs, 31 runs scored, 21 walks, 8 stolen bases and 22 strikeouts. With St. Lucie he batted .353 in 5 games in 17 at-bats with 6 hits, 4 RBIs, 2 runs scored, 4 walks, 2 stolen bases and 1 strikeout.

==== 2015 ====
Tovar spent the entire 2015 season on the 40-man roster while with the Triple-A Las Vegas 51s. With the 51s, Tovar hit .283 with three homers and 42 RBIs and had 30 steals. His season ended on August 16 because of a separated shoulder. On November 6, 2015, Tovar was outrighted off the 40-man roster and elected free agency.

=== Minnesota Twins ===
Tovar signed a minor league deal with the Minnesota Twins organization on December 15, 2015. He spent the 2016 season with the Triple-A Rochester Red Wings, slashing .249/.301/.327 with one home run and 35 RBI. Tovar elected free agency following the season on November 7.

=== St. Louis Cardinals ===
On November 18, 2016, Tovar signed a minor league contract with the St. Louis Cardinals that included an invitation to spring training. He did not make the club and was assigned to the Triple-A Memphis Redbirds, where he would spend the year, hitting .253/.306/.356 with a career-high 6 home runs and 31 RBI.

On November 6, 2017, Tovar re-signed with the Cardinals on a new minor league contract. He again spent the year in Memphis, appearing in 108 games and posting a .297/.342/.386 batting line with 5 home runs and 47 RBI. Tovar elected free agency following the season on November 2, 2018.

=== Los Angeles Angels ===
On November 13, 2018, Tovar signed a minor league contract with the Los Angeles Angels that included an invite to spring training. He did not make the team and was assigned to the Triple-A Salt Lake Bees. On June 7, his contract was selected to the active roster. On August 23, Tovar was designated for assignment after hitting .193 across 31 games. He was outrighted to Salt Lake on August 26. On October 1, 2019, he elected free agency.

=== Minnesota Twins (second stint) ===
On December 19, 2019, Tovar signed a minor league contract with the Minnesota Twins organization. Tovar did not play in a game in 2020 due to the cancellation of the minor league season because of the COVID-19 pandemic. On July 12, 2020, it was announced that Tovar had tested positive for COVID-19. He was added to the Twins' 60-man player pool for the abbreviated season, but spent the year at the alternate training site without appearing in a game for Minnesota. He became a free agent on November 2.

=== New York Mets (second stint) ===
On December 21, 2020, Tovar signed a minor league contract with the New York Mets organization. On May 18, 2021, Tovar was selected to the active roster. Tovar went 2-for-11 in 6 games for the Mets before being designated for assignment on June 1. He was outrighted to the Triple-A Syracuse Mets on June 3. On October 5, Tovar elected free agency.

=== Tecolotes de los Dos Laredos ===
On August 1, 2022, Tovar signed with the Tecolotes de los Dos Laredos of the Mexican League. In six games for Dos Laredos, he hit .211/.360/.263 with no home runs and three RBI.

=== Rieleros de Aguascalientes ===
On December 12, 2022, Tovar was traded to the Rieleros de Aguascalientes of the Mexican League in exchange for Carlos Rivero. He did not a appear in a game in 2023.

Tovar made 87 appearances for Aguascalientes in 2024, slashing .371/.440/.497 with seven home runs, 44 RBI, and four stolen bases. He became a free agent following the season.

=== Leones de Yucatán ===
On January 19, 2026, Tovar signed with the Leones de Yucatán of the Mexican League.

== See also ==
- List of Major League Baseball players from Venezuela
