= Pat Strange =

American baseball player (born 1980)

- Pitcher
- Born: August 23, 1980 (age 46); Springfield, Massachusetts, U.S.
- Batted: Right Threw: Right

MLB debut
- September 13, 2002, for the New York Mets

Last MLB appearance
- June 5, 2003, for the New York Mets

MLB statistics
- Win–loss record: 0–0
- Earned run average: 6.35
- Strikeouts: 9
- Stats at Baseball Reference

Teams
- New York Mets (2002–2003)

Patrick Martin Strange (born August 23, 1980) is an American former Major League Baseball pitcher for the New York Mets (2002–2003).

== High school career ==
Strange was a standout pitcher at Springfield Central High School. He is the only player who has twice been named the Gatorade Massachusetts Baseball Player of the Year, winning the award in 1997 and 1998.

== Professional career ==
Strange was drafted in the second round of the 1998 MLB Amateur Draft on June 2, 1998 by the New York Mets. He signed with the Mets on July 29, 1998 and was assigned to the Gulf Coast Mets of the rookie Gulf Coast League. Strange went 1-1 with a 1.42 ERA in limited action. In 1999 Strange played the entire season with the Single A Capital City Bombers. He had a successful season, going 12-5 with a 2.63 ERA in 21 games started.

By 2000, Strange started to establish himself as one of the most promising young pitchers in the Mets farm system. He split the season playing with the Single A St. Lucie Mets and the Double A Binghamton Mets. He pitched in a total of 29 games on the season for the two teams, with 23 games started. His record was a combined 14-4 with an ERA of 3.97, and he also struck out 113 batters in 143 innings pitched.

In 2001 Strange started the season at Double A Binghamton and again enjoyed success on the mound, going 12-6 in 27 games pitched with an ERA of 4.88. Strange ended the season with the Triple A Norfolk Tides making one start, which he won and did not surrender a run in 6 innings pitched.

Strange started the 2002 season with Triple A Norfolk and was 10-10 with an ERA of 3.82 in 29 games pitched with the Tides. Strange was called up to the Mets and made his major league debut on September 13, 2002. He finished the season with the Mets, making five appearances with a 1.13 ERA in 8 innings pitched.

After not making the opening-day roster in 2003, Strange started the season with the Norfolk Tides. He was again called up to the majors and made six appearances in relief. His record was 0–0 in 6 games, with a total of 9 innings pitched and an ERA of 11.00. Strange finished the season with Norfolk, making his last appearance with the Mets on June 5, 2003.

Strange spent the entire 2004 season with the Norfolk Tides. He pitched in a total of 29 games with a 10-9 record and an ERA of 5.25; he also recorded 1 save. However, Strange started to develop arm problems. At the end of the season he was granted free agency and signed with the Minnesota Twins. Strange did not make it through spring training, as his arm issues persisted. He was released by the Twins and had season-ending surgery to have bone spurs removed from his pitching elbow. The surgery ended Strange's career, as he never fully rehabilitated and was forced to retire.

Pat Strange now coaches his son Brian's baseball team for fun.

== Personal life ==
Strange's wife gave birth to a baby boy in February 2003, whom they named Brian Cole Strange in honor of former Mets standout prospect and close friend, Brian Cole, who was killed in an automobile accident in 2001.
