= Brian Cole (baseball) =

- Outfielder
- Born: September 28, 1978; Meridian, Mississippi, U.S.
- Died: March 31, 2001 (aged 22); Marianna, Florida, U.S.
- Batted: Right Threw: Right
- Stats at Baseball Reference

Brian Keith Cole (September 28, 1978 – March 31, 2001) was an American professional baseball outfielder. Cole played in Minor League Baseball for the New York Mets organization from 1998 to 2000, becoming one of the top prospects in baseball. He died in a car accident at the age of 22 in 2001.

== Career ==
Cole was born in Meridian, Mississippi and attended Meridian High School. He played both baseball and American football, scoring a school record 22 touchdowns in his senior year. He received numerous offers to play college football from Division I schools, but decided to pursue a career in baseball.

The Detroit Tigers selected Cole in the 36th round of the 1997 Major League Baseball draft, but he declined the Tigers $5,000 offer and instead attended Navarro College. In his lone season at Navarro he hit .524 with 27 home runs, 82 runs batted in (RBI), 95 runs scored and 49 stolen bases in 60 games. For his play, he was named Baseball America's Junior College Player of the Year.

Cole was then drafted by the New York Mets in the 18th round of the 1998 Major League Baseball draft and chose to sign. He made his professional debut that season for the Kingsport Mets. After 56 games with Kingsport, he was promoted to the Pittsfield Mets, where he played in two games. Overall, he hit .298/.315/.487 with five home runs, 36 RBI and 16 stolen bases. Cole played the 1999 season with the Capital City Bombers. In 125 games, he hit .316/.362/.522 with 18 home runs, 71 RBI and 50 stolen bases. Prior to the 2000 season, Baseball America ranked him as the Mets fourth best prospect. He started the season with the St. Lucie Mets. After hitting .312/.356/.528 with 15 home runs and 54 stolen bases in 91 games, he was promoted to the Double-A Binghamton Mets. He struggled early on, hitting only .136 in his first 59 bats, but rebounded to hit .350 over his next 117 at-bats. Overall, he hit .301/.347/.494 with 19 home runs, 86 RBI and 69 stolen bases. For his play, he was named the Mets Minor League Player of the Year and was honored in a pregame ceremony at Shea Stadium. After the season, he played for the Scottsdale Scorpions in the Arizona Fall League.

Prior to the 2001 season, Cole was ranked by Baseball America as the Mets third best prospect and the 64th best in all of baseball. He was invited to spring training for the first time that season, where he impressed coaches, including Mookie Wilson.

== Death ==
On March 31, 2001, Cole was driving to his parents' home in Meridian from Mets spring training in Port St. Lucie, Florida, when he lost control of his vehicle, causing it to roll numerous times and flip over. He had been trying to reenter the road after another car had entered his lane causing him to enter the median. Cole, who was not wearing his seat belt, was ejected from the car causing major injuries to his skull, brain, lungs and several other organs. He was taken to Jackson Memorial Hospital where he was pronounced dead a few hours later. His cousin was also in the car, but was wearing a seat belt and avoided serious injury.

In 2010, his family won $131 million in a lawsuit filed against the Ford Motor Company, claiming that the Ford Explorer (the car Cole was driving) is "defective and unreasonably dangerous for the uses for which it was marketed because the vehicle has an unreasonable tendency to roll when used as Ford marketed it to be used [as a station wagon replacement], and that the vehicle is also defective and unreasonably dangerous from an occupant protection or 'crashworthiness' standpoint because the safety belt failed to remain locked and permitted Brian to be thrown from the car and killed."

Teammate and friend Pat Strange named his son Brian Cole Strange, in honor of Cole.

== See also ==
- List of baseball players who died during their careers
