= Braulio Lara =

Dominican Republic baseball player (1988–2019)

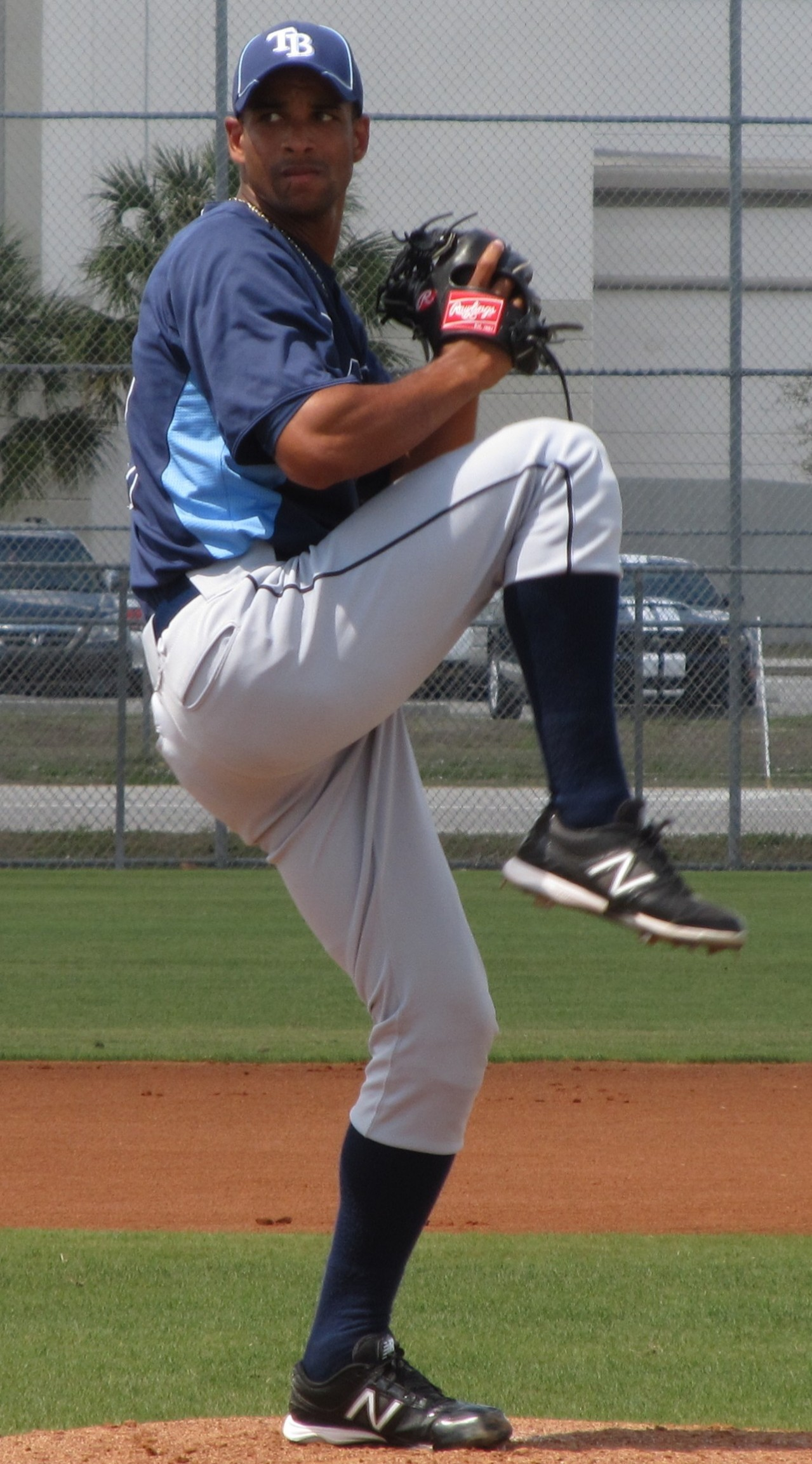
- Lara pitching for the Tampa Bay Rays spring training camp in 2012
- Pitcher
- Born: December 20, 1988; Bani, Peravia, Dominican Republic
- Died: April 20, 2019 (aged 30); Bani, Peravia, Dominican Republic
- Batted: Left Threw: Left

KBO debut
- July 3, 2016, for the SK Wyverns

Last KBO appearance
- October 1, 2016, for the SK Wyverns

Career statistics
- Win–loss record: 2–6
- Earned run average: 6.70
- Strikeouts: 40
- Stats at Baseball Reference

Teams
- SK Wyverns (2016)

Braulio Armando Lara Peguero (December 20, 1988 – April 20, 2019) was a Dominican professional baseball pitcher. He played in the KBO League for the SK Wyverns in 2016.

== Career ==
=== Tampa Bay Rays ===
Lara signed as an international free agent with the Tampa Bay Rays in 2008. He spent his first two professional seasons with the Dominican Summer League Rays, and logged a 7–5 record and 3.73 ERA in 30 total appearances. On December 31, 2009, Lara was released by the Rays, but re–signed with the team on a minor league contract on June 18, 2010. He spent the remainder of the year with the rookie–level Princeton Rays, recording a 6–4 record and 2.18 ERA with 58 strikeouts across 13 starts.

Lara spent the 2011 season with the Single–A Bowling Green Hot Rods, starting 25 games and registering a 5–11 record and 4.94 ERA with 111 strikeouts in 120 1/3 innings pitched. In 2012, Lara pitched in 25 games (starting 21) for the High–A Charlotte Stone Crabs, and went 6–10 with a 5.71 ERA and 82 strikeouts in 112.0 innings of work.

On December 6, 2012, the Miami Marlins selected Lara from the Rays in the Rule 5 draft, On March 17, 2013, Miami returned him to the Rays organization. That year, he spent the season with the Double–A Montgomery Biscuits, and also reached Triple–A for the first time, playing in one game for the Durham Bulls. In 45 games for Montgomery, he registered a 4.38 ERA with 53 strikeouts in 72.0 innings of work.

Lara again split the 2014 season between Durham and Montgomery. He appeared in 45 contests between the two affiliates, and pitched to a cumulative 5.77 ERA with 57 strikeouts and 3 saves in 57 2/3 innings pitched.

=== San Francisco Giants ===
On November 18, 2014, Lara signed a minor league contract with the San Francisco Giants organization that included an invitation to spring training. Lara split the 2015 season between the Double–A Richmond Flying Squirrels and Triple–A Sacramento River Cats. In 32 total games, he accumulated a 6.08 ERA with 46 strikeouts in 50 1/3 innings pitched.

He began the 2016 back with Sacramento, and posted a 3.90 ERA with 25 strikeouts and 1 save in 27 2/3 innings pitched.

=== SK Wyverns ===
On June 23, 2016, Lara signed with the SK Wyverns of the KBO League. In 17 games (9 starts) for the Wyverns, he struggled to a 2–6 record and 6.70 ERA with 40 strikeouts in 48 1/3 innings of work.

=== Washington Nationals ===
On November 19, 2016, Lara signed a minor league contract with the Washington Nationals that included an invitation to spring training. He spent the 2017 season with the Double–A Harrisburg Senators, making 34 appearances and logging a 4.08 ERA with 47 strikeouts across 39 2/3 innings of work. Lara elected free agency following the season on November 6, 2017.

=== Sultanes de Monterrey ===
On February 20, 2018, Lara signed with the Sultanes de Monterrey of the Mexican Baseball League. In 17 games for Monterrey, Lara worked to a 5.23 ERA with 13 strikeouts in 10 1/3 innings of work.

=== Generales de Durango ===
On April 28, 2018, Lara, Edgar Torres, Juan Rodriguez, and Moises Gutierrez were traded to the Generales de Durango. In two games for Durango, he allowed five runs on two hits and three walks in 1 1/3 innings. Lara was released by the team on May 5.

== Death ==
Lara was killed in a car crash in the Dominican Republic on April 20, 2019.

== See also ==
- List of baseball players who died during their careers
- Rule 5 draft results
