= José Castillo (infielder) =

Venezuelan baseball player (1981–2018)

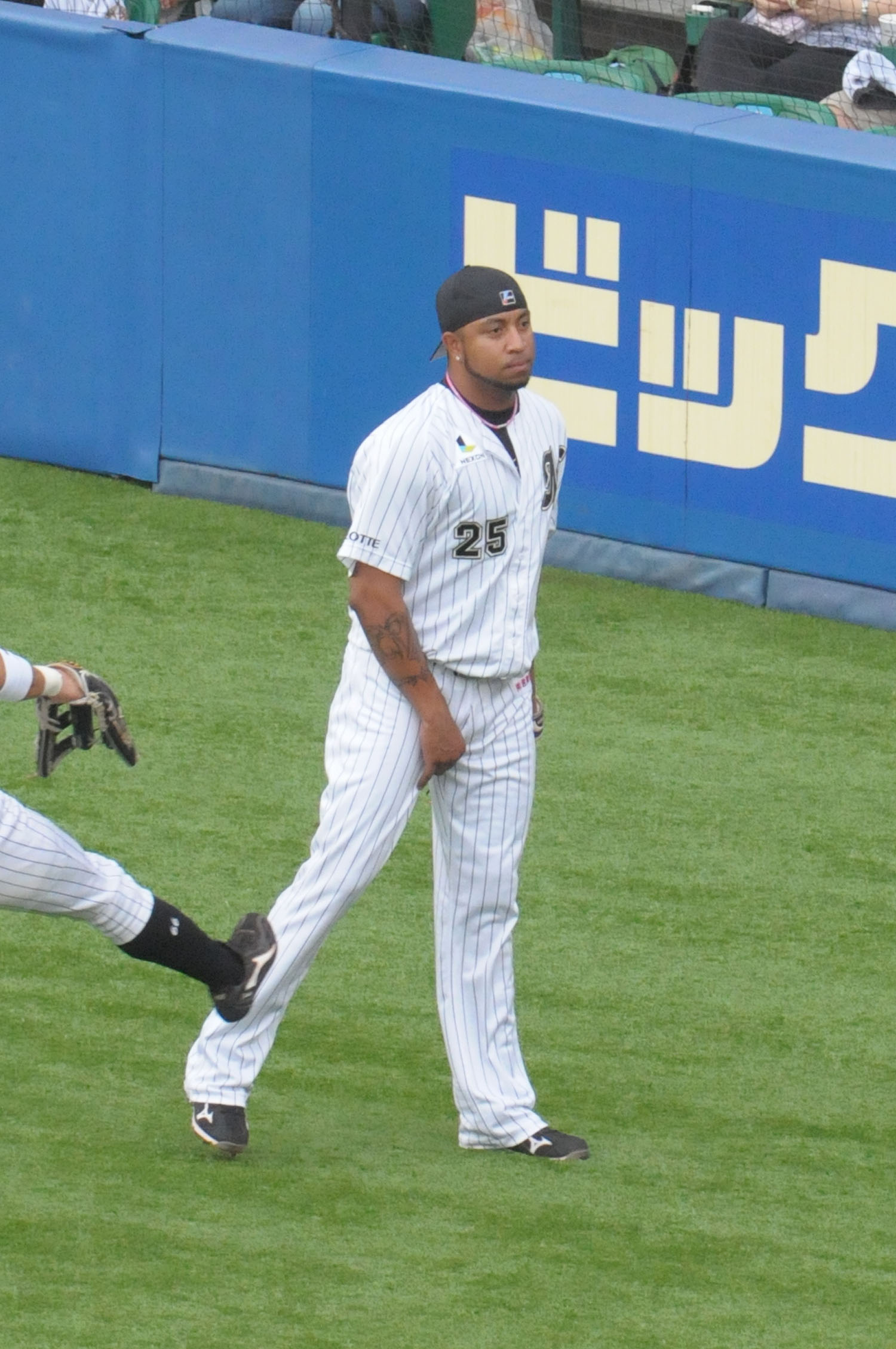
- Castillo with the Chiba Lotte Marines in 2011
- Second baseman / Third baseman
- Born: March 19, 1981; Las Mercedes, Guárico, Venezuela
- Died: December 6, 2018 (aged 37); Cocorote Municipality, Yaracuy, Venezuela
- Batted: Right Threw: Right

Professional debut
- MLB: April 7, 2004, for the Pittsburgh Pirates
- CPBL: May 20, 2009, for the Uni-President 7-Eleven Lions
- NPB: March 26, 2010, for the Yokohama BayStars

Last appearance
- MLB: September 28, 2008, for the Houston Astros
- CPBL: September 27, 2009, for the Uni-President 7-Eleven Lions
- NPB: October 22, 2011, for the Chiba Lotte Marines

MLB statistics
- Batting average: .254
- Home runs: 39
- Runs batted in: 218

CPBL statistics
- Batting average: .314
- Home runs: 13
- Runs batted in: 65

NPB statistics
- Batting average: .271
- Home runs: 24
- Runs batted in: 89
- Stats at Baseball Reference

Teams
- Pittsburgh Pirates (2004–2007); San Francisco Giants (2008); Houston Astros (2008); Uni-President 7-Eleven Lions (2009); Yokohama BayStars (2010); Chiba Lotte Marines (2011)

Career highlights and awards
- Taiwan Series champion (2009)

José Castillo Rondón (Spanish pronunciation: [xoˈse kasˈtiʎo]; March 19, 1981 – December 6, 2018) was a Venezuelan professional baseball infielder. He played in Major League Baseball (MLB) for the Pittsburgh Pirates, San Francisco Giants, and Houston Astros. He also played in Nippon Professional Baseball (NPB) for the Yokohama BayStars and Chiba Lotte Marines, and in the Chinese Professional Baseball League (CPBL) for the Uni-President 7-Eleven Lions. He was killed in a car crash alongside Luis Valbuena in 2018 in Venezuela, caused by bandits in an attempted robbery.

== Professional career ==
=== Pittsburgh Pirates ===
On July 2, 1997, Castillo signed with the Pittsburgh Pirates organization as an international free agent. He made his professional debut in 1999 with the rookie-level Gulf Coast League Pirates. In 2000, he spent the year in Single-A with the Hickory Crawdads, slashing .299/.346/.480 with 16 home runs and 72 RBI. The next year, he played for the High-A Lynchburg Hillcats, where he slashed .248/.288/.359 in 125 games. He remained in Lynchburg for the 2002 season, batting .300/.370/.453 with 16 home runs and 81 RBI in 134 games. He played with the Double-A Altoona Curve in 2003, hitting .287/.339/.390 with 5 home runs and 66 RBI.

Castillo was named the fourth-best prospect in the Pirates organization by Baseball America following the 2003 season, and he also ranked as the top Pittsburgh prospect by USA Today Sports Weekly.

In 2003, Castillo was both the starting shortstop for the World Team in Major League Baseball's All-Star Futures Game and an All-Star in the Double-A Eastern League.

In his rookie season, Castillo impressed the Pirates' front office with his defensive plays. In the field, he displayed good range and a very strong arm in 2004, even better than the Pirates expected from a former shortstop. At the plate, however, his play was more typical of a 22-year-old who had never played in Triple-A. Except for hot streaks in April and August, Castillo did not hit for average or power and was not very selective at the plate, striking out with regularity (even if not quite as often as some of his teammates) and walking very little despite hitting in front of the pitcher for most of the season. However, his power potential was apparent from the fact that the majority of his extra base hits and home runs were hit the opposite way—including a 445-foot (136 m) blast to center field on July 5, 2004, at Pro Player Stadium – and his minor league statistics indicated that his plate discipline should improve. He finished with eight home runs, 39 RBI and a .256 batting average, despite missing two months on the disabled list. Because of his defense and high ceiling, he entered 2005 as the Pirates' starting second baseman.

2005 was a trying season for Castillo. He was on the disabled list for most of April with a strained left oblique muscle. In late August, he tore the medial collateral ligament in his left knee during a game against the St. Louis Cardinals and missed the rest of the season.

Despite the injuries, Castillo showed progress both defensively and at the plate when he did play. In the field, he and shortstop Jack Wilson were largely responsible for the Pirates turning more double plays than any National League team except the Cardinals. At the same time, Castillo hit .268 with 11 homers and 53 RBI, significantly improving his power production while cutting down heavily on his strikeouts (from 92 in 383 at bats in 2004 to 59 in 370 at bats in 2005). The Pirates expected Castillo to be 100% for the start of spring training in February 2006, though he was not able to play winter ball in his native Venezuela.

Castillo was the Pirates' starting second baseman in almost every game in 2006. After a slow April, Castillo was among the best hitters in all of the majors in May, culminating in his "Player of the Week" award for the last week in May, during which he led the NL in RBI, total bases, slugging percentage, and home runs.

The 2006 Major League Baseball All-Star Game was held in Pittsburgh, and Castillo finished third among NL second basemen in the All-Star voting behind Chase Utley and Craig Biggio. Castillo's teammates Jason Bay and Freddy Sanchez represented the Pirates in the All-Star Game that year.

But after a promising start, Castillo struggled down the stretch of the 2006 season. In the 92 games since homering seven times in a two-week span in May, Castillo hit only six home runs. He snapped an 0–23 hitting slump on September 23 against the Padres, but had been benched for three consecutive games before that. By the end of the season, his batting average had fallen to .253. His signature excellent defense was also missing at times in 2006, he committed a team high 18 errors. Castillo finished September batting only .087 for the month and did not start in several games.

He finished the 2006 season with 14 home runs, 65 RBI, 131 hits, and 25 doubles to go along with his .253 batting average.

Despite rumors he might be traded in the off-season, the Pirates elected to keep Castillo. With the emergence of infielders Freddy Sanchez and José Bautista, Castillo entered spring training with his role on the team uncertain.

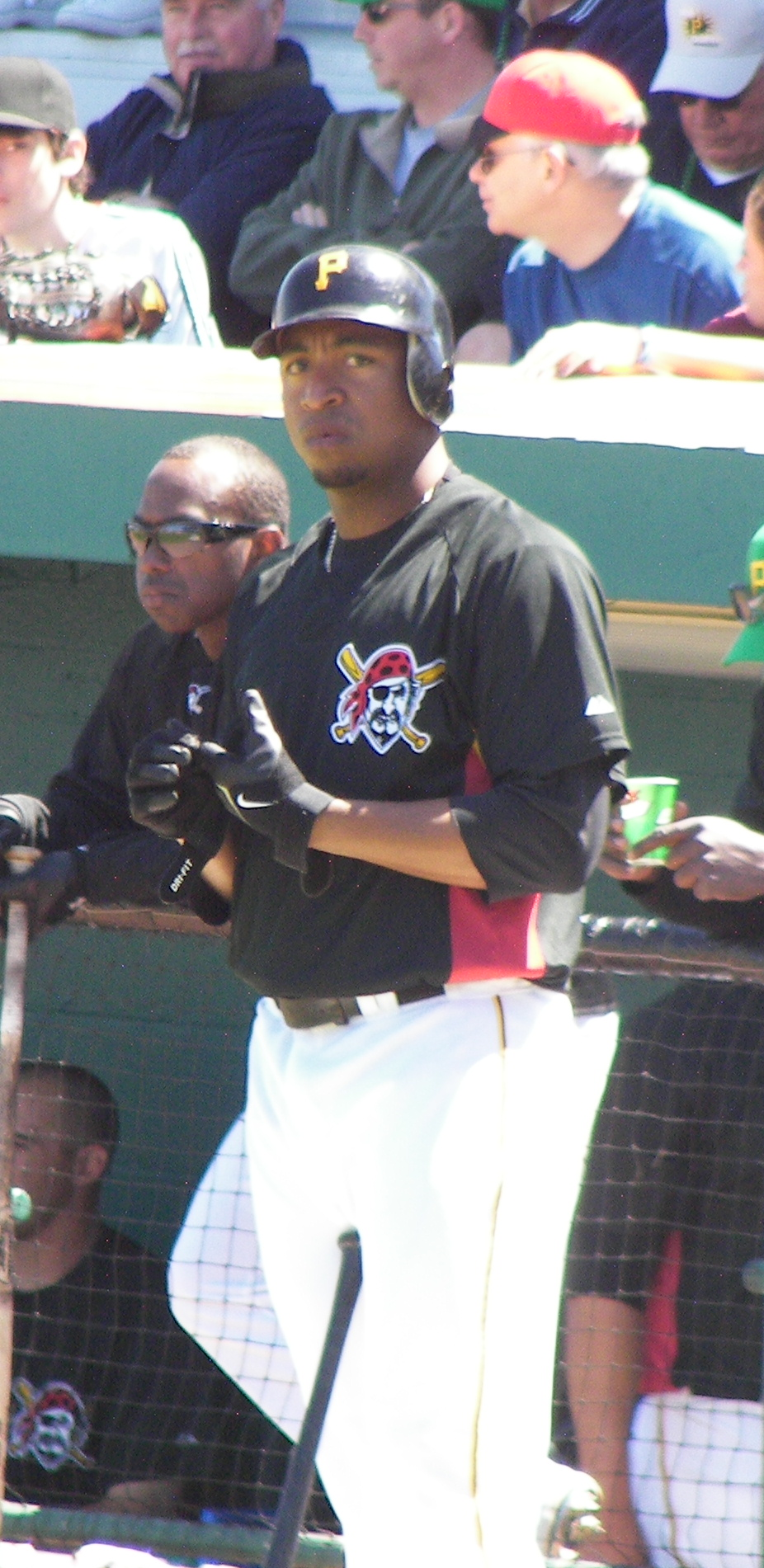
Castillo during his tenure with the Pirates in 2007 spring training.

Castillo entered spring training slimmed down and had a stellar spring. But on March 23, the Pirates announced that José Bautista would start the season as the team's starting third baseman, meaning Castillo would start the season as a utility bench player. Though with Freddy Sanchez nursing an injury, Castillo started at second base for the first five games of the season.

Through May and June, Castillo had received few starts and minimal pinch hit appearances. Though he received praise from manager Jim Tracy about his attitude after being left on the bench, Castillo's agent asked the Pirates to trade him due to poor playing time. With the team, and notably starting shortstop Jack Wilson, struggling, there was speculation Castillo could find his way into a starting role, or at least see his appearances become more regular. 2007 closed a disappointing season for Castillo. He played in only slightly over half of the team's games, and many of his appearances were as a pinch hitter rather than a starter. He never got into an offensive groove and finished with a .244 batting average, 24 RBI, and no home runs. He was released by the club on December 6.

=== Florida Marlins ===
On December 24, 2007, Castillo signed a major league contract with the Florida Marlins, but was placed on waivers in the spring.

=== San Francisco Giants ===
Castillo was claimed off waivers by the San Francisco Giants on March 22, 2008, who took on his $850,000 salary. Castillo opened the 2008 season as the team's starting third baseman, replacing the Giants' departed third baseman, Pedro Feliz, and combining adequate defensive play with a .268 average and 26 RBIs through the month of June. Castillo was designated for assignment by San Francisco on August 13, 2008.

=== Houston Astros ===
On August 20, 2008, Castillo was claimed off waivers by the Houston Astros. He finished the season with Houston, hitting .281 with 2 RBI in 15 games. On October 9, 2008, he elected free agency.

=== Washington Nationals ===
On December 17, 2008, Castillo signed a minor league contract with the Washington Nationals organization. However, Castillo was released by the team in Spring Training.

=== Uni-President 7-Eleven Lions ===
After his release from Washington, Castillo joined the Uni-President 7-Eleven Lions of the Chinese Professional Baseball League in Taiwan for the 2009 season. In 73 games for the Lions, Castillo slashed .314/.346/.500 with 13 home runs and 65 RBI. He won the Taiwan Series with the club in 2009.

=== Yokohama BayStars ===
On December 19, 2009, Castillo signed a one-year contract with the Yokohama BayStars of Nippon Professional Baseball. Castillo played in 131 games for the club in 2010, batting .273/.309/.446 with 19 home runs and 55 RBI.

=== Diablos Rojos del México ===
On March 30, 2011, Castillo signed with the Diablos Rojos del México of the Mexican League. In 68 games for the Red Devils, Castillo batted .357/.399/.541 with 10 home runs and 60 RBI. On June 19, 2011, Castillo was released by the club.

=== Chiba Lotte Marines ===
Castillo signed with the Chiba Lotte Marines of Nippon Professional Baseball on June 21, 2011. In 86 games for the team, Castillo hit .269/.315/.360 with 5 home runs and 34 RBI. He became a free agent after the season.

=== Rojos del Águila de Veracruz ===
On March 14, 2012, Castillo signed with the Rojos del Águila de Veracruz of the Mexican League. He played in 109 games for the team in 2012, slashing .314/.351/.455 with 15 homers and 55 RBI.

=== Pericos de Puebla ===
On March 22, 2013, Castillo signed with the Pericos de Puebla of the Mexican League. He batted .369/.406/.636 with 25 home runs and 108 RBI in 102 games for the team.

=== Rojos del Águila de Veracruz (second stint) ===
On March 26, 2014, Castillo re-signed with the Rojos del Águila de Veracruz. He appeared in 71 games for the team, posting a batting line of .279/.308/.397 with four home runs, 41 RBI, and four stolen bases.

=== Olmecas de Tabasco ===
On July 3, 2014, Castillo was traded to the Olmecas de Tabasco. He finished the year with Tabasco, playing in 36 games for the club and batting .317/.370/.423 with three home runs and 20 RBI. In 2015, Castillo played in 111 games for the team, slashing .292/.312/.381 with eight home runs and 50 RBI. On October 21, 2015, Castillo was released by the team.

=== Rojos del Águila de Veracruz (third stint) ===
On April 1, 2016, Castillo signed with the Rojos del Águila de Veracruz. Castillo hit .274 with no home runs and seven RBI in 16 appearances for the team. He was released by Veracruz on April 21.

=== Piratas de Campeche ===
On April 27, 2016, Castillo signed with the Piratas de Campeche of the Mexican League. He posted a batting line of .278/.316/.389 with two home runs and eight RBI in 21 games for the team before he was released on May 24.

=== Parmaclima ===
On June 13, 2017, Castillo signed with Parmaclima of the Italian Baseball League. In 18 games for the club, Castillo posted a .238 average with 10 RBI.

== Death ==
On December 6, 2018, Castillo, Luis Valbuena, and Carlos Rivero were in a car in Yaracuy driven by Rivero's chauffeur when the group was ambushed by highway robbers. The driver attempted to avoid them but the vehicle struck a rock and overturned, killing Castillo and Valbuena. Four men were arrested in connection with the incident after being found in possession of the players' property. Castillo, Rivero, and Valbuena were members of Venezuelan winter team Cardenales de Lara, and were returning from a game played that day.

== See also ==
- List of Major League Baseball players from Venezuela

Sporting positions
Preceded by Carlos Beltrán	NL Player of the Week Award; 2006	Succeeded by Jason Bay
