= Intussusception =

Intussusception may refer to:

- Intussusception (medical disorder)
- Intussusception (blood vessel growth)
- Rectal prolapse
- Internal rectal prolapse
