= Boase =

Boase is a surname. Notable people with the surname include:

- Charles William Boase (1828–1895), British antiquarian
- Elizabeth Boase (born 1963), Australian biblical scholar
- Frederic Boase (1843–1912), British librarian and biographer
- George Clement Boase (1829–1897), English bibliographer and antiquary
- Henry Boase (1763–1827), English banker and author
- Henry Samuel Boase (1799–1883), Cornish geologist
- T. S. R. Boase (1898–1974), art historian, academic, and Vice-Chancellor of Oxford University
- Tessa Boase, British journalist and author
- Wendy Boase (1944–1999), Australian co-founder of the children's publishing company Walker Books

== See also ==
- Boas (disambiguation)
