= Boaz (disambiguation) =

Boaz is a biblical figure in the Book of Ruth.

Boaz may also refer to:

== Places in the United States ==
- Boaz, Alabama
- Boaz, Kentucky
- Boaz, Missouri
- Boaz, West Virginia
- Boaz, Wisconsin

== People ==
=== Given name ===
- Boaz Arad (1956–2018), Israeli visual artist
- Boaz Bloomer, English industrialist
- Boaz Davidson (born 1943), Israeli filmmaker
- Boaz Ellis (born 1981), Israeli foil fencer
- Boaz Frankel (born 1982), television personality, who hosted and co-created Clips & Quips
- Boaz Janay (born 1952), Israeli basketball player
- Boaz Kofman (born 1935), Israeli footballer
- Boaz Kramer (born 1978), Israeli Paralympic medalist wheelchair tennis player, and sports administrator
- Boaz Mahune, Hawaiian civil leader
- Bo'az Ma'uda (born 1987), Israeli singer
- Boaz Merenstein (born 1970), Israeli tennis player
- Boaz Moda'i, Israeli diplomat
- Boaz Myhill (born 1982), American-born Welsh footballer
- Boaz Rodkin (born 1962), Israeli ambassador to Albania
- Boaz Sharabi (born 1947), Israeli singer and actor
- Boaz Solossa (born 1986), Indonesian footballer
- Boaz Weinstein (born 1973), American hedge fund manager
- Boaz Yakin (born 1965), American screenwriter

=== Surname ===
- David Boaz (1953–2024), libertarian and member of the Cato Institute
- Donny Boaz (born 1980), American actor
- Hiram Abiff Boaz (1866–1962), American professor and Bishop in the Methodist Episcopal Church, South
- Martha Boaz (1911–1995), American librarian
- Noel T. Boaz (born 1952), American biological anthropologist and physician, founder of Virginia Museum of Natural History
- Sam Boaz (1917–2013), American jurist and legislator

== Other ==
- David ben Boaz, Karaite Jewish scholar who flourished in the tenth century CE
- Boaz and Jachin, a pair of pillars on the porch of Solomon's Temple
- Boaz mastodon

== See also ==
- Boas (disambiguation)
