= James Manson =

James Manson may refer to:

== Sports ==
- James Manson (Australian footballer) (born 1966), Australian rules footballer
- Jim Manson (Australian footballer) (?–2010), Australian rules football player

== Others ==
- James Manson (engineer) (1845–1935), locomotive superintendent of the Glasgow and South Western Railway
- James Bolivar Manson (1879–1945), artist
- James Manson (aviation)
- Jim Manson (politician) (1908–1974), Australian politician, one of the Members of the Victorian Legislative Assembly, 1958–1961
- Little Jimmy Manson, see Murdoc Niccals
