= James Ireland =

Scottish architect

James Ireland (4 December 1846 – 29 June 1886) was a short-lived but productive 19th-century Scottish architect, specialising in schools.

== Life ==
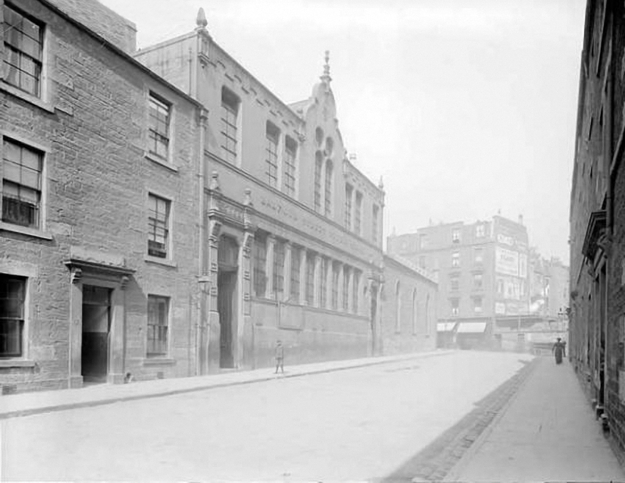
Balfour Street Public School, Dundee

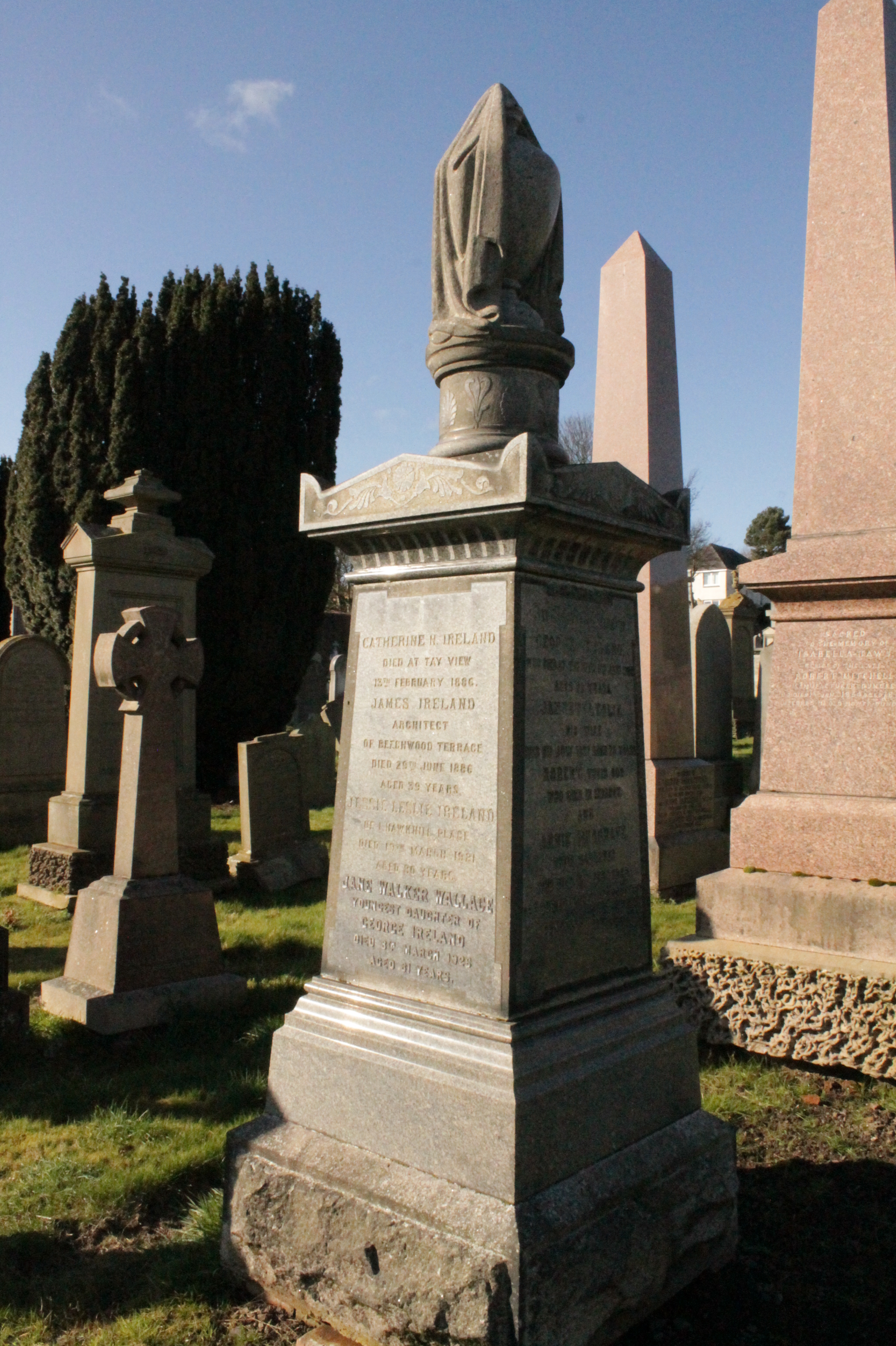
The grave of James Ireland, Western Cemetery, Dundee

He was born on 4 December 1846 at Hawkhill Place in Dundee the son of George Ireland and his wife, Janet Leslie. His father was a partner in George and James Ireland, owners of the Temple Mill on Tay Street, a flax mill.

His family moved to "Tay View" at 287 Perth Road in Dundee (then a new house) around 1860. This is a large mid-terraced house overlooking the River Tay. In 1865/1866 his father went into partnership with Henry Samuel Boase to buy the Wellfield juteworks and created Boase & Ireland.

In 1876 he went into partnership with David Maclaren designing new schools in the wake of the Education (Scotland) Act 1872.

He lived at "Beechwood" in Dundee in his final years.

He died in a friend's house at Blairgowrie of either gangrene and/or tuberculosis at on 29 June 1886, aged only 39. He is buried with his siblings in the Western Cemetery, Dundee. The grave lies on the west side of the central path just before the first terrace.

== Family ==
In October 1884 he married Ada Greenhaigh at Manchester Cathedral.

== Main works ==
(works are in Dundee unless otherwise stated)

- Ancrum Road School (1874)
- Braeknowe House (1874)
- North Dudhope Mill (1874)
- Clepington School (1875)
- Primary School, Coupar Angus (1875)
- Damacre Road School, Brechin (1875)
- Dyehouse at Wellfield Works (1875) for Boase and Ireland.
- Dudhope School (1875)
- St David's School (1875)
- Balfour Street School (1876)
- Primary School, Newport-on-Tay (1876)
- Primary School, Carnoustie (1876)
- High Free Church, Hilltown of Dundee (1877)
- Primary School, Monifieth (1877)
- "Mount Pleasant" (1879)
- Sailors Home (The Angel, Dundee) (1879)
- "Great Eastern" Public House, Dock Street (1880)
- Grosvenor Terrace (1882)
- Mitchell Street School (1883)
- Chemistry Laboratories, University College (1883)
- Butterburn School (1883)
- Dundee and District Female Rescue Home, Lochee (1883)
- Harris Academy (1884) original Park Place building
- Glebelands School (1884)
- Rosebank School (1885)
