= Boas =

Boas might refer to:

- Boidae, snakes
- Boas' sign, pain below the right shoulder
- BOAS is an acronym for Brachycephalic Obstructive Airway Syndrome

== People with the surname ==
- Abraham Tobias Boas (1844–1923), Australian rabbi
- André Vilas Boas (born 1983), Portuguese footballer
- André Villas-Boas (born 1977), Portuguese football manager
- Antonio Villas Boas (1934–1992), Brazilian alien abduction claimant
- Benjamin Boas (born 1983), American writer and consultant on Japanese culture
- Carlos Thorne Boas (1923–2021), Peruvian novelist, writer and lawyer
- Ernst Philip Boas (1891–1955), American physician
- Franz Boas (1858–1942), German-American anthropologist and linguist
- Franziska Boas (1902–1988), American choreographer, percussionist, and educator
- Frederick S. Boas (1862–1957), English drama scholar
- George Boas (1891–1980), American philosopher
- Isaac Herbert Boas (1878–1955), Australian scientist
- Harold Boas (1883–1980), Australian town planner and architect
- Harold P. Boas (born 1954), American mathematician
- Ismar Isidor Boas (1858–1938), German gastroenterologist
- Johan Erik Vesti Boas (1855–1935), Danish zoologist
- Kléber Boas (born 1975), Brazilian footballer
- Marie Boas Hall (1919–2009), American historian of science, sister of Ralph, Jr
- Mary L. Boas (1917–2010) American mathematician and physics teacher
- Ralph P. Boas, Jr (1912–1992), American mathematician
- Roger Boas (1921–2017), American politician

== See also ==
- Boa (disambiguation)
- Boaz (disambiguation)
