= John Steggall =

English mathematician

- Born: 19 November 1855; London, England
- Died: 26 November 1935 (aged 80); Dundee, Scotland
- Education: Trinity College, Cambridge
- Spouse: Isabella Katherine Fraser
- Parent: J W B Steggall M.R.C.S.
- Scientific career
- Fields: Mathematics
- Workplaces: University College, Dundee; now University of Dundee

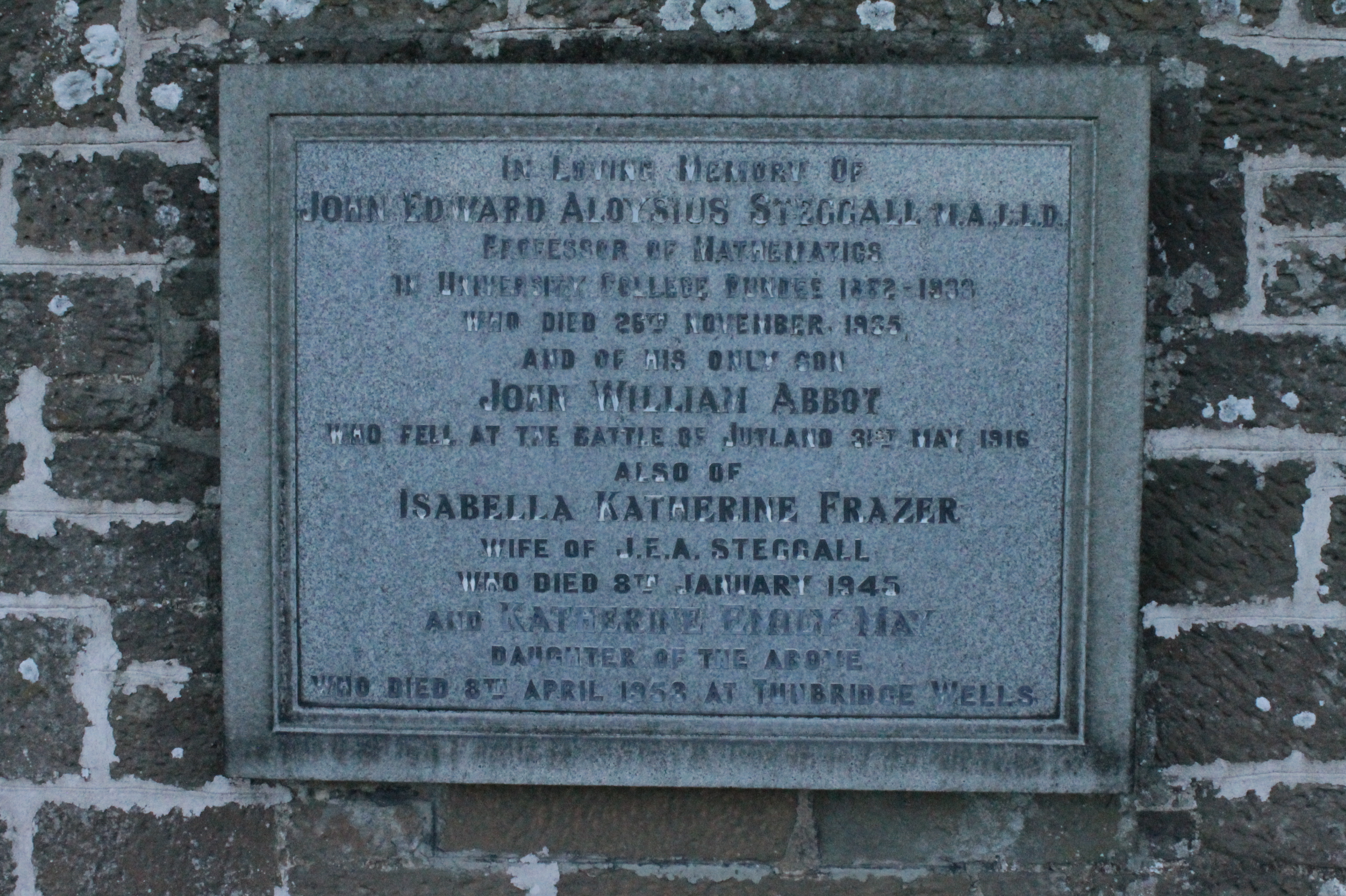
The grave of John Steggall, Western Cemetery, Dundee

John Edward Aloysius Steggall ARIBA FRSE LLD (19 November 1855 – 26 November 1935) was an English mathematician and professor at the University College, Dundee (now University of Dundee).

== Life and work ==
He was born on 19 November 1855 in London, the son of Dr J W B Steggall of Charing Cross Hospital, a physician and surgeon, living at Queen Square in Bloomsbury.

He attended the City of London School before entering Trinity College, Cambridge, where he graduated second wrangler in the Mathematical Tripos of 1878 and winning the Smith's Prize of that year.

He taught as Assistant Master at Clifton College, Bristol from 1878 to 1879, before becoming Fielden Lecturer at Owens College, Manchester, from 1880 to 1882. In 1883 he was appointed as the Chair of Mathematics and Natural Philosophy (Physics) in the newly instituted University College at Dundee. He lived at "Woodend" in Perth.

In 1885 he was elected a Fellow of the Royal Society of Edinburgh. His proposers were Balfour Stewart, William Evans Hoyle, Patrick Geddes and Peter Guthrie Tait. He resigned temporarily and was re-elected in 1914, his proposers being Cargill Gilston Knott, Sir Edmund Taylor Whittaker, Sir Ernest Wedderburn and Ellice Horsburgh.

He remained at Dundee University until 1933 when he retired after completing fifty years of professional work. St Andrews University (which at that time controlled Dundee University) awarded him an honorary doctorate (LLD) on his retiral.

Steggall was an active member of the Association for the Improvement of Geometrical Teaching and member of the Dundee School Board. As an enthusiastic traveler and skilled amateur photographer, he traveled widely in Europe; his photographic collection is preserved in the library of the University of St Andrews.

He died in Dundee on 26 November 1935 a few days after his 80th birthday. He is buried in the Western Cemetery, Dundee. The grave lies on the western wall on the lower section.

A keen photographer he left a collection of over 2000 photographs to St Andrews University.

== Family ==
In 1878 he married Isabella Katherine Frazer (d.1945), sister of James George Frazer.

Their only son, John William Abbot Steggall, was killed on 31 May 1916 serving on HMS Invincible on the first day of the Battle of Jutland.

== Bibliography ==
- Mann, A.J.S.; Craik, A.D.D. (2011). "Scotland. Land of opportunity but few rewards". In Raymond Flood; Adrian Rice; Robin Wilson (eds.). Mathematics in Victorian Britain. Oxford University Press. pp. 77–102. ISBN 978-0-19-960139-4.
- Peddie, William (1936). "John Edward Aloysius Steggall". Proceedings of the Edinburgh Mathematical Society. 4 (4): 270–271. doi:10.1017/S0013091500027565. ISSN 0013-0915.
