= William Wilson (Dundee minister) =

Scottish minister (1808–1888)

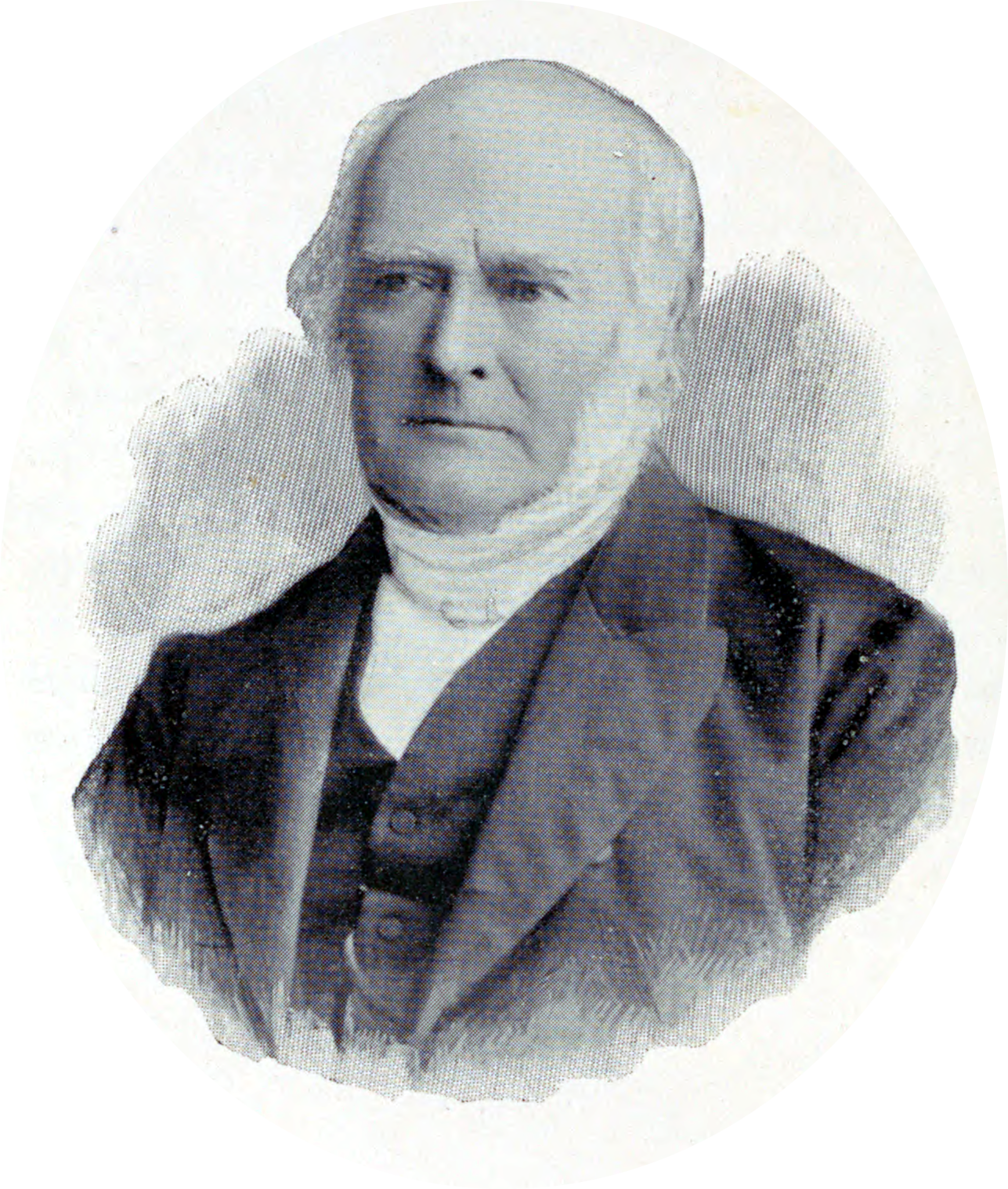
- William Wilson from Eminent Arbroathians

Personal details
- Born: 18 June 1808
- Died: 14 January 1888 (aged 79)

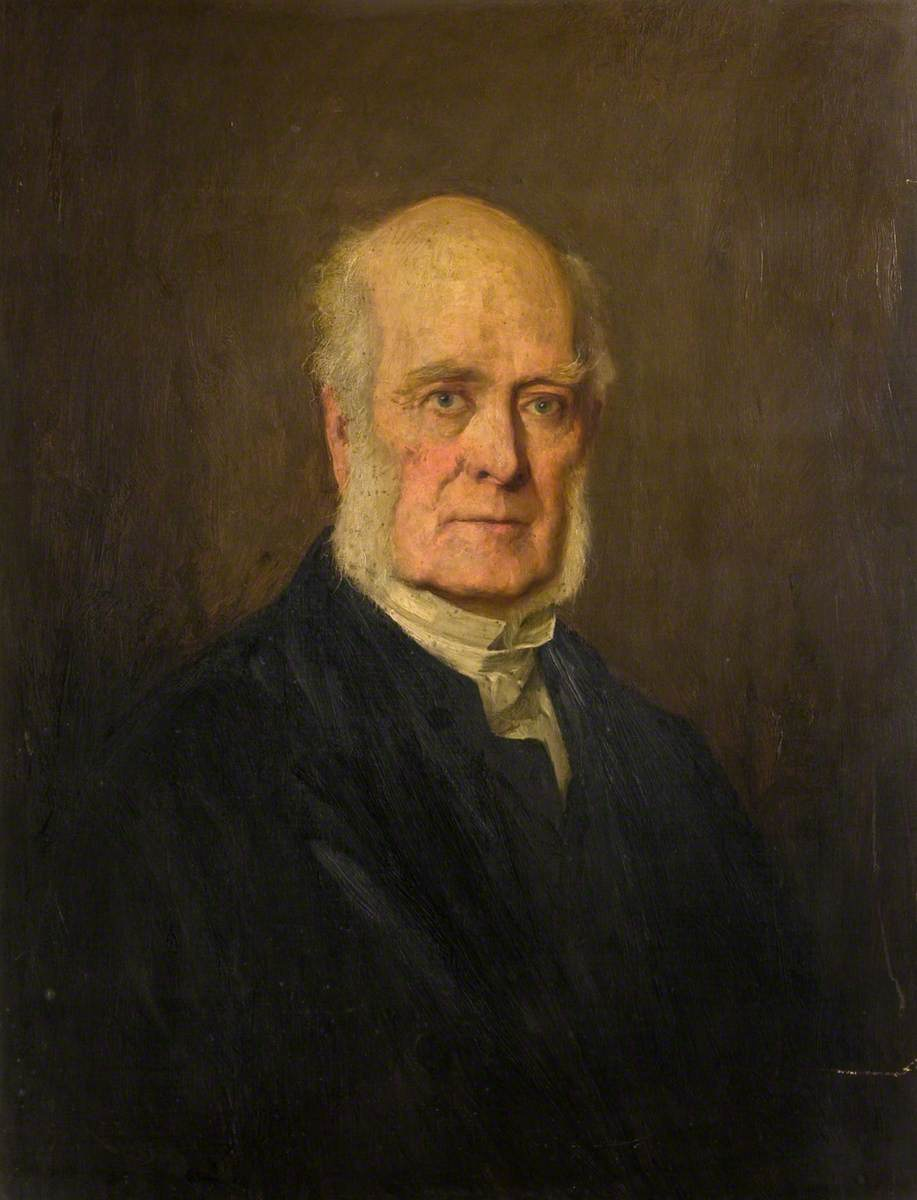
William Wilson by James Michael Brown

William Wilson (18 June 1808–14 January 1888) was a Scottish minister of the Free Church of Scotland who served as Moderator of the General Assembly in 1866/67.

== Life ==
He was born in Westruther on 18 June 1808. He studied at the University of Edinburgh, and befriended John Laird. They both then studied theology at Divinity Hall under Rev Dr Thomas Chalmers, graduating with an MA. Together with Robert McCheyne, Alexander Somerville, Horatius Bonar and Andrew Bonar they founded the Exegetical Society.

He was licensed to preach by the Church of Scotland and Presbytery of Lauder in 1833 but failed to find a patron, a then essential requirement and one of the main issues in the later establishment of the Free Church. While he awaited a patron he did parochial mission work south of the River Clyde in Glasgow. He also became editor of the Scottish Guardian: a twice weekly evangelical newspaper, in this period.

In 1837 he finally found a patron and was ordained at Carmyllie a village east of Dundee. This post was relatively short-lived as he left the Church of Scotland in the Disruption of 1843 and joined the Free Church. Unfortunately insufficient parishioners left with him and they were unable to establish a new church in the parish. Instead he and those who left worshipped in barns or the fields of sympathetic farmers. However, also losing his manse, he lived six miles away from the parish. In 1845 a church and manse were finally built at Carmyllie. However, Wilson then left the parish in 1848 to serve the Mariners Church in Dundee, a former Secessionist Church. Ownership issues forced the Free Church of Scotland to sell the church in 1850 and establish their own church. This was finished in 1852 and named St Paul's Free Church. It stood on the Nethergate and had a congregation of 440.

Wilson did much mission work and in 1863 was appointed Convenor of the Home Mission Committee for the Free Church, holding the post for ten years. In 1866 he was elected Moderator of the General Assembly. From 1888 he stepped down as the full-time minister of St Paul's and was replaced by his assistant, Richard Waterston, replaced in turn by Rev William Patrick during Wilson's life.

For his last 30 years he lived at 18 Afton Place in Dundee.

In 1877 the University of Edinburgh awarded him an honorary doctorate (DD).

In November 1887 he resigned all roles due to ill-health, and quickly became bed-ridden.

He died on 14 January 1888. He is buried in the Western Cemetery, Dundee.

== Publications ==
- Statement of the Scriptural Argument against Patronage (Edinburgh, 1842)
- The Duty of Bringing Helpless Souls to Jesus (Dundee, 1850)
- The Kingdom of Our Lord Jesus Christ (Edinburgh, 1859)
- The Heavenward Path (Edinburgh, 1862)
- Christ setting His Face towards Jerusalem (Dundee, 1878)
- Memorials of Robert Smith Candlish, D.D. (Edinburgh, 1880)
- The Presence of Christ in the Meetings of the Office-Bearers of His Church
- Free Church Principles [Chalmers Lecture] (1887)
- Christ's Gift to the Church and His Authority (1858).
- He edited Daniel Defoe's Memoirs of the Church of Scotland (Perth, 1844) and Stirling's Naphtali (Perth, 1845)
- Sermons XXII., CXXVI.; Lecture XIX. (Free Church Pulpit, i., ii.)
- Biography of David Welsh, D.D. (Disruption Worthies, Edinburgh, 1876)
- Account of the Parish (New Statistical Account Scotland, xi.).

== Bibliography ==
- Eminent Arbroathians, 345-58
- The Border Almanac (1889)
- Annals of the Disruption, 179, 263, 762
- Smith's Scottish Clergy, iii., 351

== Family ==
He married 13 January 1840, Eliza Smith (died 25 February 1860), daughter of Alexander White of Drimmietermont, Forfar, and Helen Farquhar, and had issue —

- Helen Farquhar, born 20 August 1841, died 17 February 1890
- Agnes Martin, born 4 July 1843 (married Irvine Drimmie)
- Andrew James, born 10 April 1845, died at Coconada, Madras, 18 August 1881
- Eliza Jane, born 19 June 1847
- Ann Isabella, born 19 January 1849 (married William Wilson)
- Mary Louisa, born 17 December 1850, died 29 October 1898
- Alexander White, born 1 October 1853, died in India 15 July 1875
- William, born 14 April 1855, died June 1918.

== Artistic recognition ==
His portrait by James Michael Brown is held by Dundee Art Gallery.

== Sources ==
- Bayne, Peter (1893). The Free Church of Scotland : her origin, founders and testimony. Edinburgh: T. & T. Clark. pp. 127 et sequim.
- Brown, Thomas (1883). Annals of the disruption. Edinburgh: Macniven & Wallace. p. 787 et passim.
- Buchanan, Robert (1854a). The ten years' conflict : being the history of the disruption of the Church of Scotland. Vol. 1. Glasgow; Edinburgh; London; New York: Blackie and Son.
- Buchanan, Robert (1854b). The ten years' conflict : being the history of the disruption of the Church of Scotland. Vol. 2. Glasgow; Edinburgh; London; New York: Blackie and Son.
- M'Bain, James M (1897). Eminent Arbroathians: being sketches historical, genealogical, and biographical, 1178-1894. Arbroath: Brodie & Salmond. pp. 346-358.
- Ritchie, Lionel Alexander (2004). "Wilson, William". Oxford Dictionary of National Biography (online ed.). Oxford University Press. doi:10.1093/ref:odnb/29701. (Subscription, Wikipedia Library access or UK public library membership required.)
- Scott, Hew (1925). Fasti ecclesiae scoticanae; the succession of ministers in the Church of Scotland from the reformation. Vol. 5. Edinburgh: Oliver and Boyd. pp. 433-434. This article incorporates text from this source, which is in the public domain.
- Smith, John (1851). Our Scottish clergy : fifty-two sketches, biographical, theological, & critical, including clergymen of all denominations. Vol. 3. Edinburgh : Oliver & Boyd; London : Simpkin, Marshall; Glasgow : A. Smith. pp. 351-356. This article incorporates text from this source, which is in the public domain.
- Stronach, George (1900). "Wilson, William (1808-1888)". In Lee, Sidney (ed.). Dictionary of National Biography. Vol. 62. London: Smith, Elder & Co. This article incorporates text from this source, which is in the public domain.
- Wilson, William, minister of St. Paul's Free Church, Dundee (1880). Memorials of Robert Smith Candlish, D.D. : minister of St. George's Free Church, and principal of the New College, Edinburgh with a chapter on his position as a theologian by Robert Rainy. Edinburgh: A. and C. Black. pp. 11–12.
- Wylie, James Aitken, ed. (1881). Disruption worthies : a memorial of 1843, with an historical sketch of the free church of Scotland from 1843 down to the present time. Edinburgh: T. C. Jack. pp. 505–510. This article incorporates text from this source, which is in the public domain.
