= Western Cemetery, Dundee =

Cemetery in Dundee, Scotland

Coordinates: 56°27′29″N 3°00′30″W

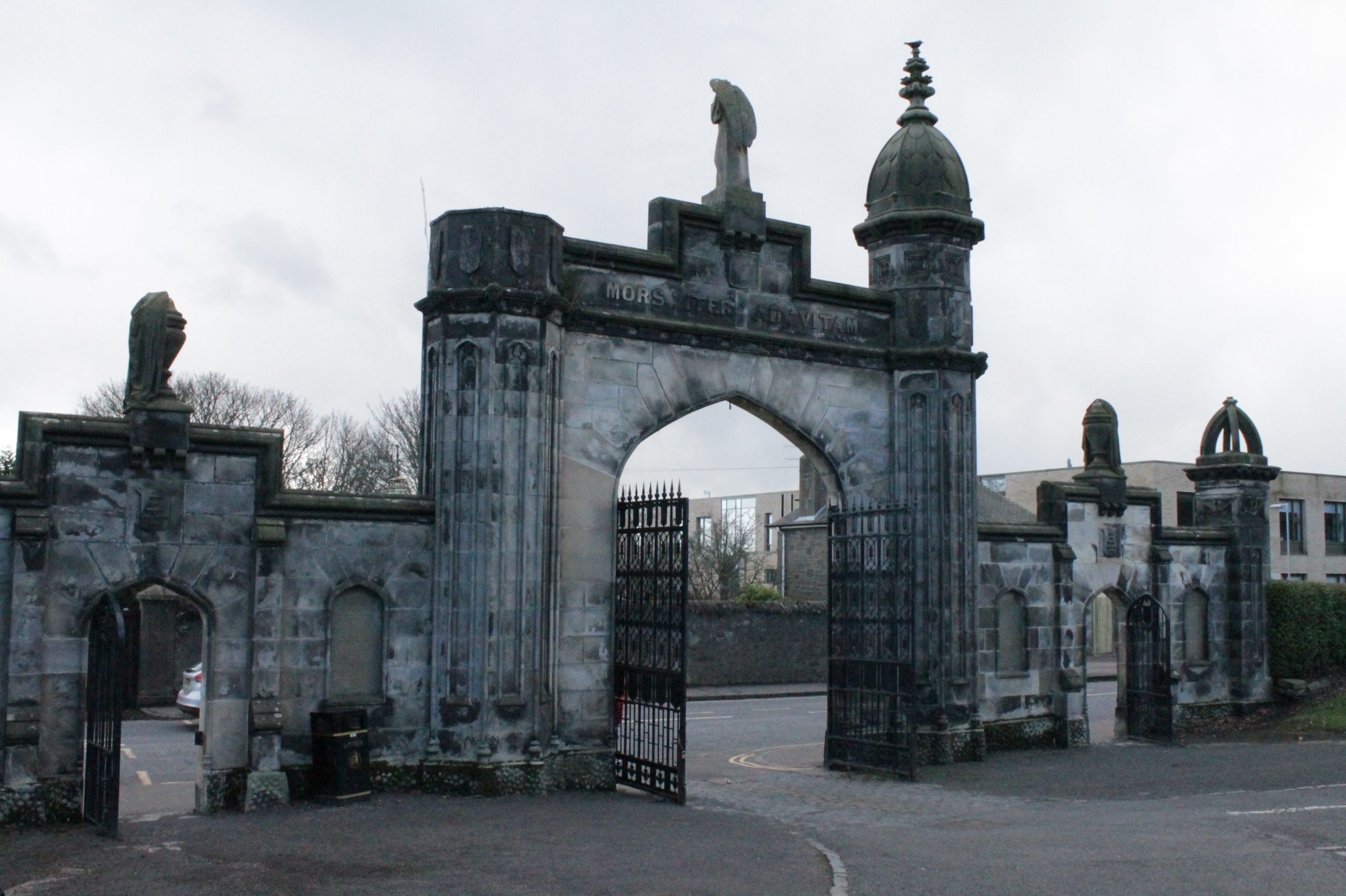
The entrance gates of the Western Cemetery, Dundee

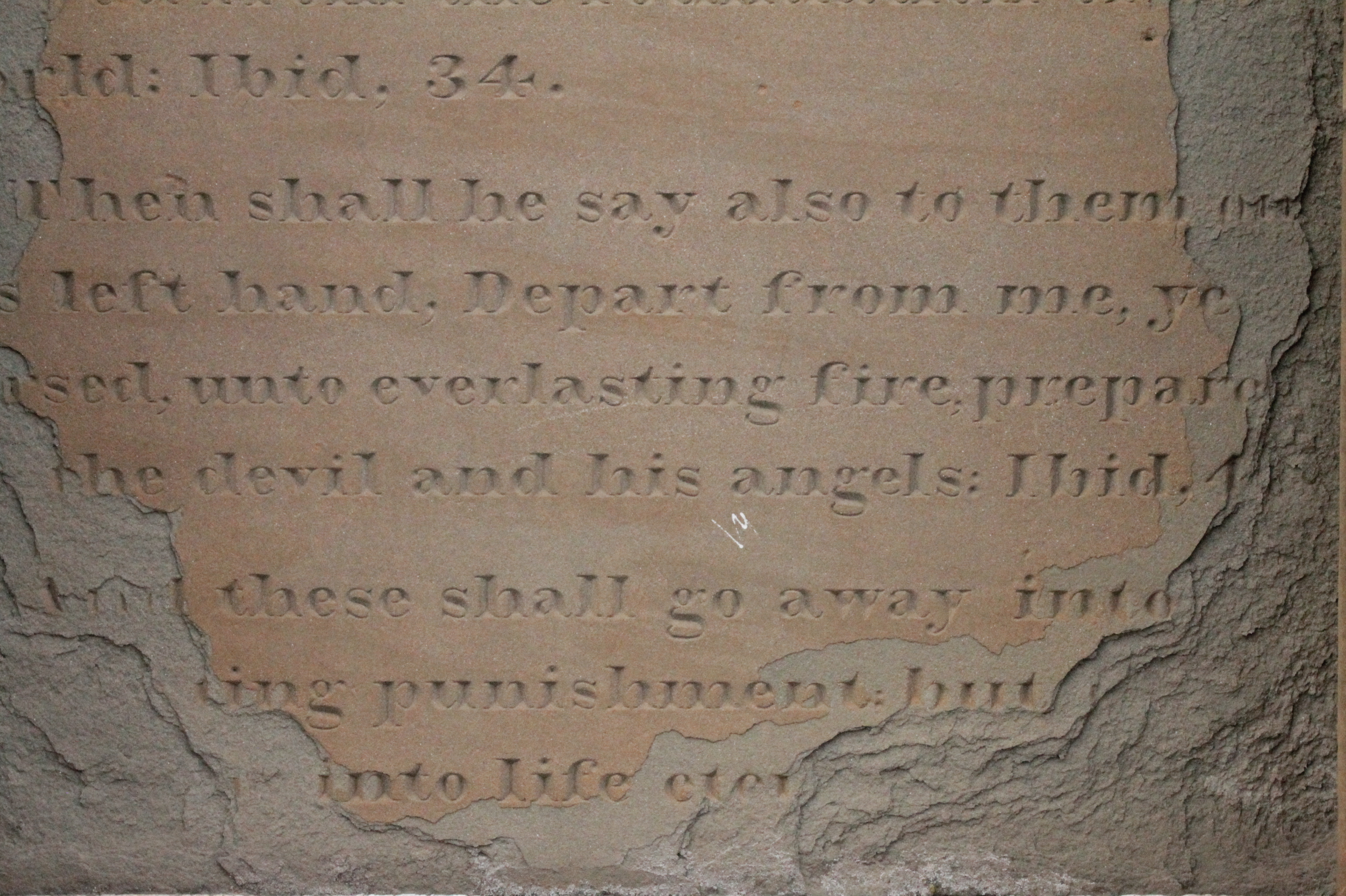
Inscription on the entrance gates, Western Cemetery, Dundee

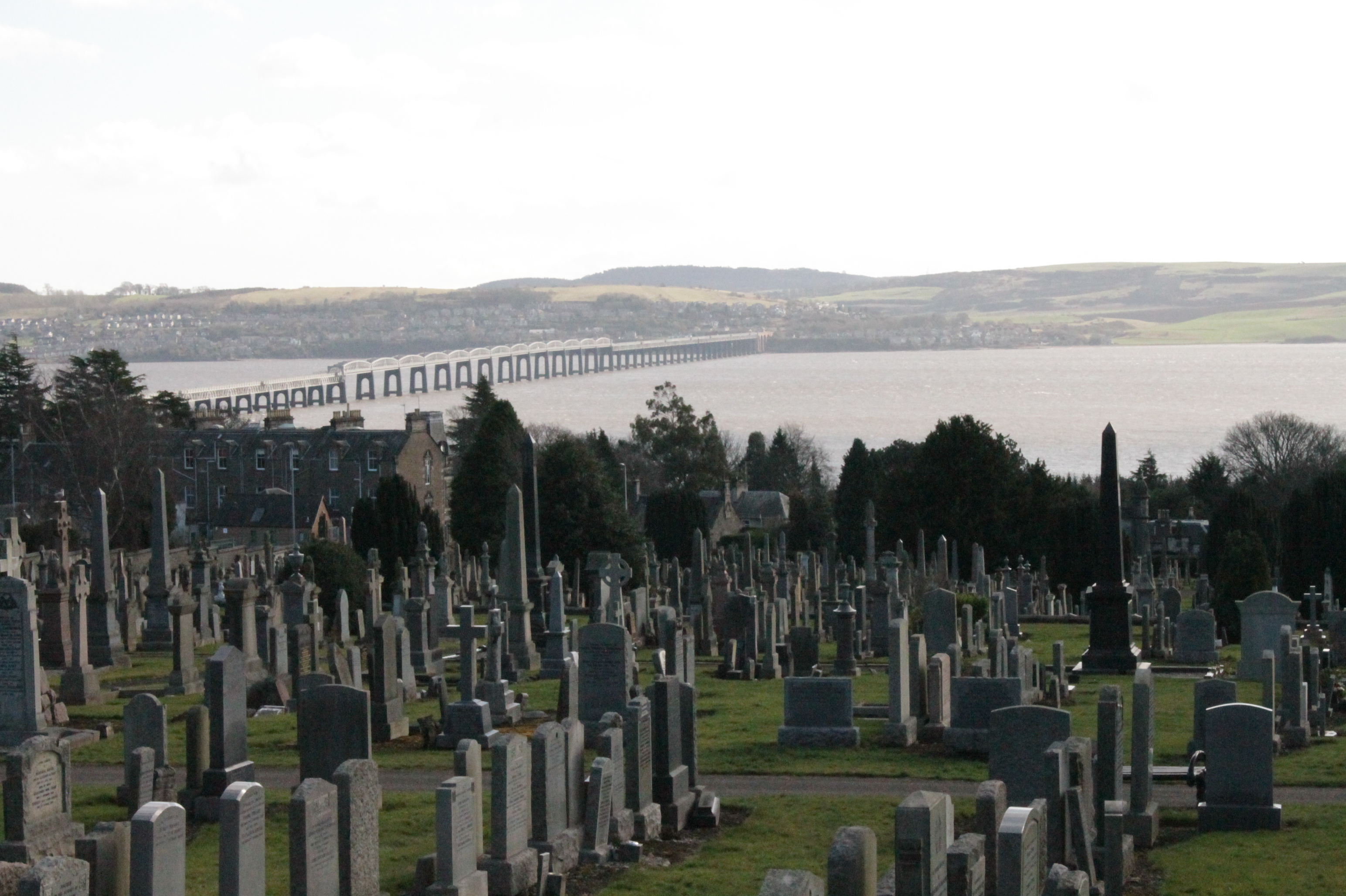
Western Cemetery, Dundee from the upper terrace looking over River Tay

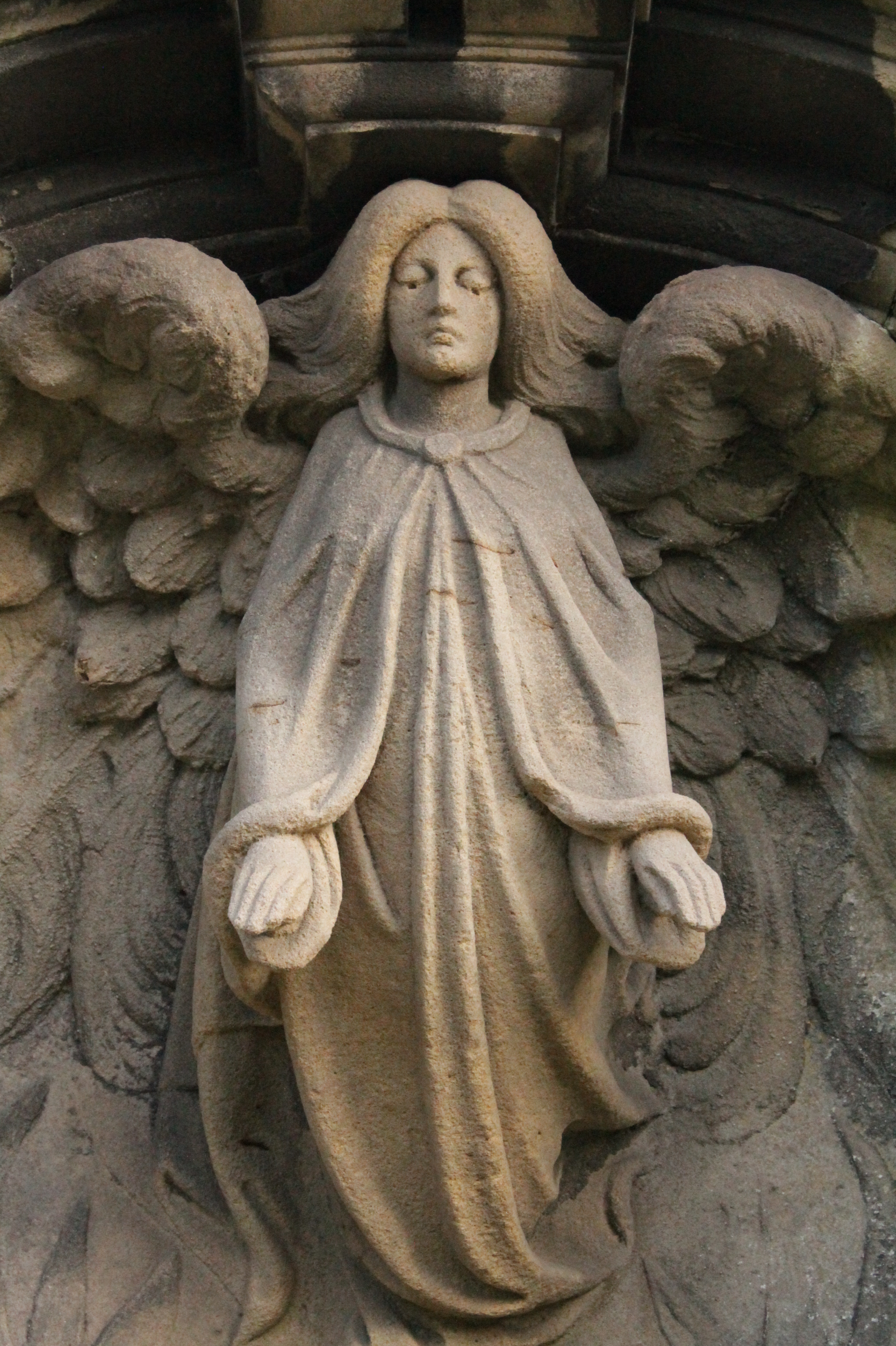
Angel on the Reoch grave, Western Cemetery, Dundee

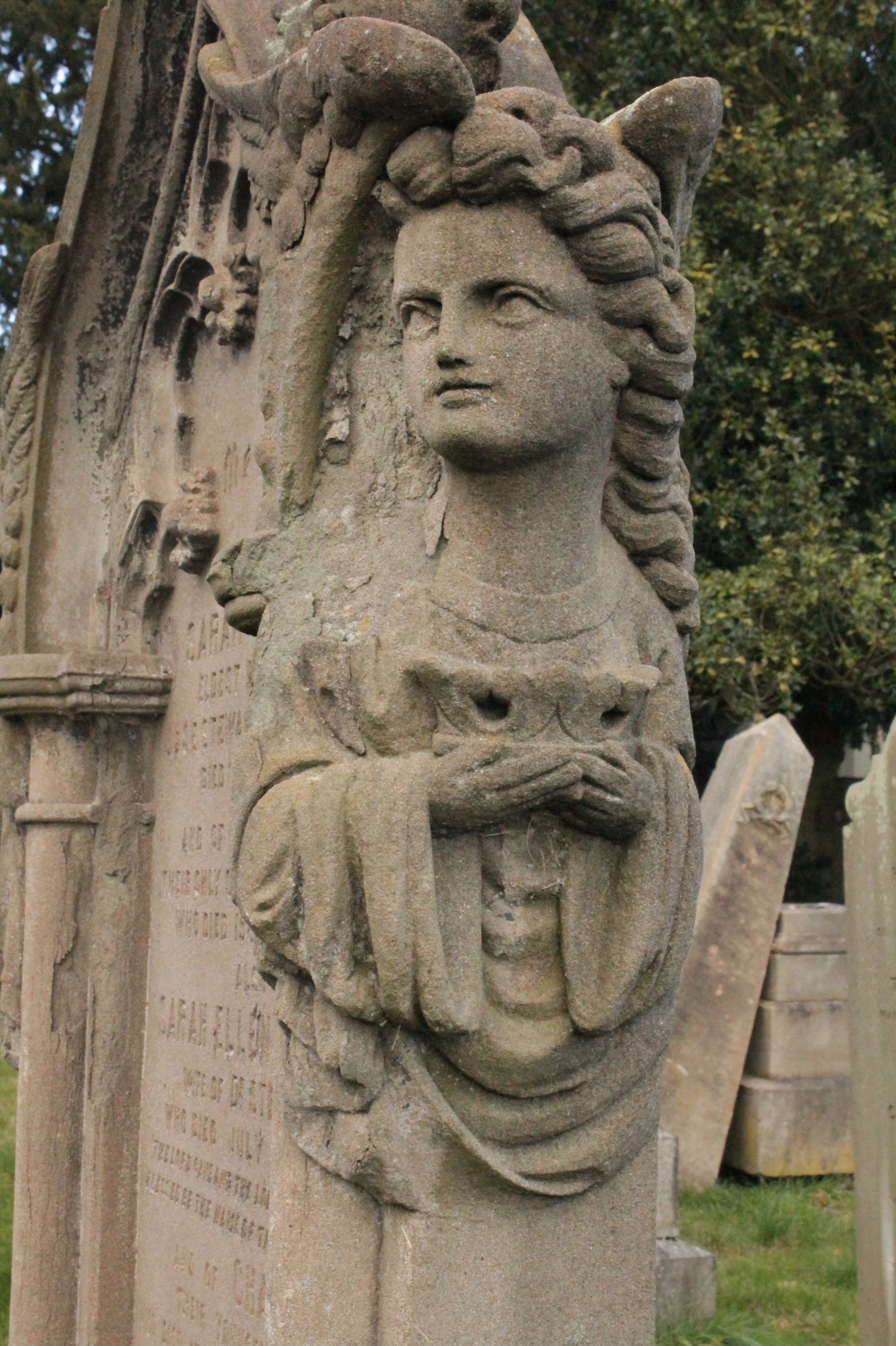
St Margaret on the shoulder of the Stewart & Pollard grave, Western Cemetery, Dundee

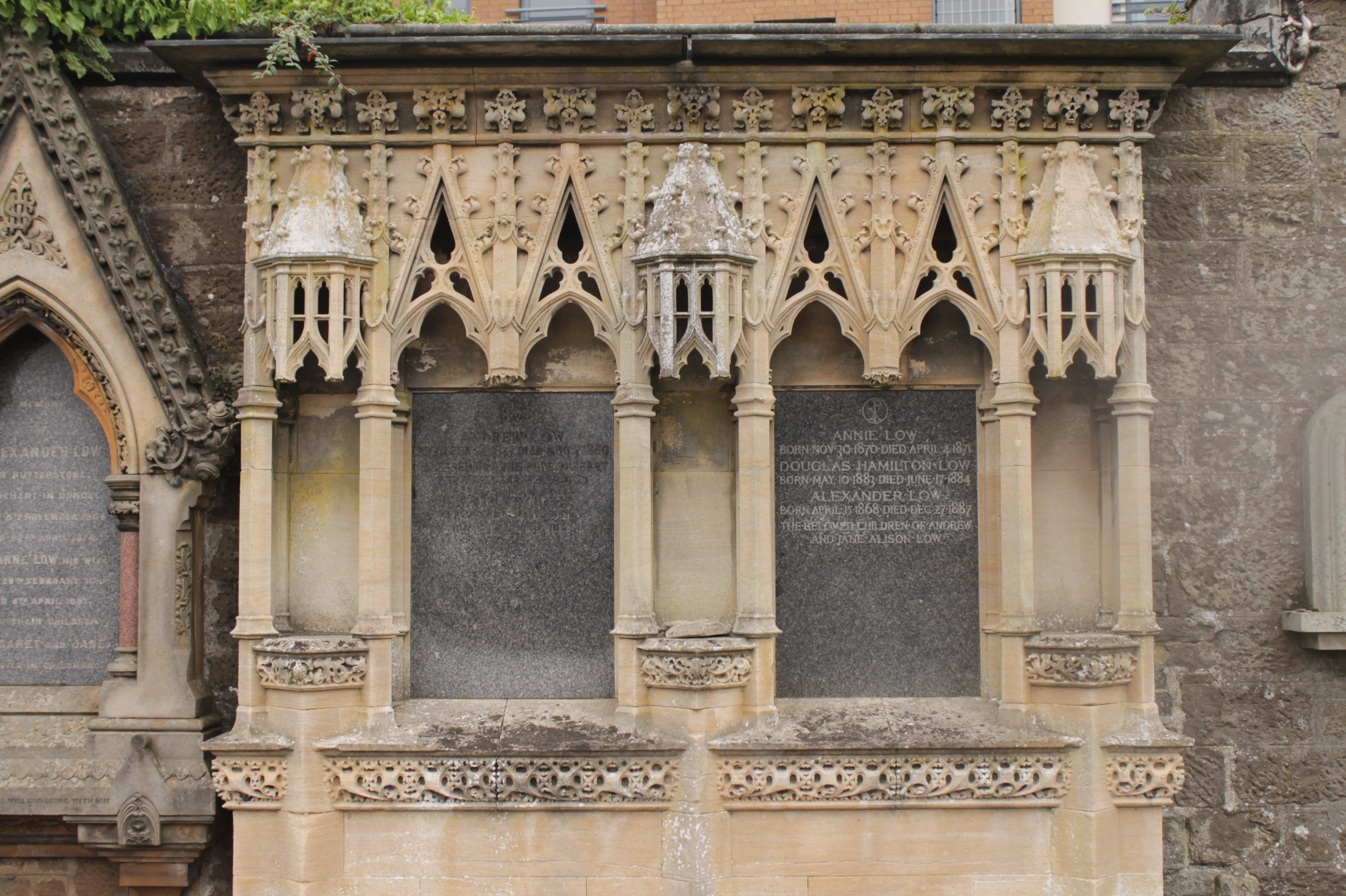
The grave of Andrew Low, Western Cemetery, Dundee

The Western Cemetery in Dundee, Scotland, is a still-operational cemetery founded in the mid 19th century. It rises northwards from the Perth Road, with terraces in its upper sections. It views over the Firth of Tay to the Tay Rail Bridge and Fife. The Western Cemetery is maintained and managed by Dundee City Council.

== Background ==
The Cemeteries Act (Scotland) 1840 had permitted private companies to create burial grounds, unconnected to the historic church parish burial grounds or traditional burial grounds such as The Howff. This provided a religiously neutral burial ground (at a price) in a controlled environment, usually some distance from the town centres.

Dundee had planned a new cemetery north of the Howff Burial Ground based on a curvilinear layout as already executed in burial grounds such as Dean Cemetery in Edinburgh (1842). However, such curvilinear layouts, whilst visually more attractive, were far more difficult both to manage and maintain, and to track graves once more than a few dozen were created.

A rectilinear layout was therefore chosen, based on more organised layouts such as found in Grange Cemetery in south Edinburgh (1847). The site chosen was Blackness House and Blackhouse Nurseries, to the west of Dundee, thereby gaining the name Western Cemetery. It had the huge advantage of already being laid out with paths and an established landscape, due to its previous nursery use.

Unlike most traditional graveyards, the site was far from flat. However, as a nursery, soil depths were good, and the ground was well-drained. The southern aspect also created a sunnier position than normal and views from almost all parts of the cemetery (especially the upper sections). The terraces within the cemetery predate its conversion to cemetery use and belong to Blackness House.

Designed by James Findlater in 1852 (mainly the entrance gates) the cemetery did not fully open until around 1858. From around 1860 the cemetery quickly became popular, especially amongst the wealthier families.

Lightning destroyed the dome on top of the eastern gatepost in 1953 and this has never been repaired. The site changed from private control to Council control in 1979. In 2014 the Council created a new section in the centre of the western wall for interment of ashes.

A new northern terrace was created in 2014 as an area for private burials.

Local names include Nucator, Mealmaker, Easson, Fyffe, Soutar, McMaster and Keiller.

== Notable interments ==
- William Allan (c. 1890–1945) architect
- George Armitstead, Baron Armitstead (1824–1915) MP for Dundee
- Henry Samuel Boase FRS (1799–1883) geologist
- George Addison Cox (1826–1889) architect/engineer – The design and engineering organisation of Camperdown Works; and engineering specification for Cox's Stack.
- George Methven Cox (1852–1916) jute baron of the Camperdown Works
- Thomas Hunter Cox (1820–1892) jute baron in the Camperdown Works
- James Guthrie Davidson (1837–1891) founder of Rodyk & Davidson in Singapore
- James Thomson Fairweather (1811–1859) tobacco merchant, founder of Fairweather & Sons (one of the first burials)
- James Fairlie Gemmill FRSE (1867–1926)
- Sir Douglas Hardie (1923–2005) instigator of the Tay Road Bridge and the person who brought RRS Discovery to Dundee
- Sir William High (1858–1934) shipowner and Lord Provost of Dundee 1923 to 1929
- William Hunter (1840–1925) Lord Provost of Dundee
- James Ireland (1846–1886) architect
- Alexander Keiller (1820–1877) creator of Keiller's marmalade
- John Mitchell Keiller (1851–1899) owner of Keiller's marmalade during its major expansion in the 19th century
- James Laing (1813–1886) inventor
- William Duncan Latto (1823–1899) editor of "The People's Journal"
- James Bowman Lindsay inventor and electricity pioneer
- Henry McGrady (1836–1917) Lord Provost of Dundee 1896 to 1899
- Alexander Mathewson (1822-1914) Lord Provost of Dundee 1890 to 1893
- James Duncan Mitchell (1892–1915) drowned on RMS Lusitania (memorial only)
- Alexander Hay Moncur (1830–1903) Provost of Dundee 1881–1884
- Brigadier Surgeon George Alexander Moorhead (died 1912) and his pioneering doctor daughter Alice Moorhead (1868–1910) (sister of the suffragette Ethel Moorhead)
- Charles Ower (1849–1921) and his brother Leslie Ower (1851–1916) architect
- Rev Dr John Paterson DD (1776–1855) missionary in Russia
- George Alexander Pirie (1863–1929) radiologist
- Prof Lloyd Turton Price (1874–1933) professor of surgery at St Andrews University
- William Robertson (1825–1899) Provost of Dundee
- John Greig Sibbald (1922–2006) founder of Graham & Sibbald surveyors
- Major General Richard Talbot Snowden-Smith (1887–1951) pioneer air pilot, pupil of Blondeau
- John Steggall (1855–1935) mathematician
- William Bruce Thompson (1837–1923) engineer and shipbuilder
- Patrick Hill Thoms (1873–1946) architect
- Alexander Gordon Milne Thomson FGS (1866–1919) jute mill owner and geologist
- David Couper Thomson founder of D. C. Thomson & Co. Ltd
- Sir Thomas Thornton of Thornton Castle (1830–1903) town clerk
- Preston Watson (1880–1915) aviation pioneer
- Very Rev Dr James Weatherhead DD (died 1944) Moderator of the General Assembly of the United Free Church of Scotland in 1927
- David Dougal Williams FRSA (June 1888 – 27 September 1944) was a Cheshire-born artist and art teacher who lived, worked and died in Dundee.
- Very Rev William Wilson (1808–1888) Moderator of the General Assembly of the Free Church of Scotland in 1866.

== War Graves ==
The cemetery contains the Commonwealth war graves of 28 British service personnel from both World Wars.
