= Douglas Hardie =

Scottish businessman

Sir Douglas Hardie
- Born: Douglas Fleming Hardie; 26 May 1923
- Died: 7 July 2005 (aged 82); Dundee, Scotland
- Resting place: Western Cemetery, Dundee
- Education: Glenalmond College
- Occupations: businessman Chairman: CBI Scotland, Dayco UK
- Known for: Dundee-based projects
- Notable work: instigated Tay Road Bridge, RSS Discovery relocation
- Spouse: Dorothy Alice Warner
- Father: John M. Hardie (jute merchant)

Sir Douglas Fleming Hardie CBE FRIAS FRSA LLD (26 May 1923 – 7 July 2005) was an influential 20th century Scottish businessman who instigated the Tay Road Bridge and other Dundee-based projects. He was Chairman of CBI Scotland and Dayco UK. He was responsible for the relocation of RSS Discovery to Dundee.

== Life ==
He was born on 26 May 1923. He was the son of John M. Hardie of the jute merchants Hardie & Smith who owned the Baltic Linen Works on Annfield Road in Dundee. The family lived at Grayfield House at 62 Annfield Road, close to the factory.

He was educated at Glenalmond College. His potential university career was hijacked by the events of World War II. In 1941 he joined the British Army and went to Sandhurst Military Training College to train as an officer. He then joined the 1st Battalion Fife and Forfar Yeomanry, a specialist tank battalion. At the D-Day landings he was part of advanced tank operations using flamethrower tanks to clear German positions. he was demobbed in 1946 at the rank of Major.

He was the youngest ever Deacon of the Nine Trades of Dundee.

In the early 1960s he began lobbying the Secretary of State for Scotland (both Michael Noble and Willie Ross) to build a road bridge across the River Tay to link Dundee to Fife. Despite government opposition, he gathered enough local agreement to establish the principle, leading to the opening of the Tay Road Bridge in 1966.

In 1976 he became Chairman of the CBI in Scotland. He was a company Director of multiple Scottish companies and bodies including the Clydesdale Bank and Princes Trust. From 1979 to 1992 he was a prominent member of the Scottish Development Agency. He was also on the board of Grampian Television, the North of Scotland Hydro-Electric Board and Winston Churchill Memorial Trusts.

In 1985, in conjunction with the Dundee Heritable Trust, he organised a revitalisation of the docks, centred on the securing of Scott's RSS Discovery. It is now the primary tourist destination in Dundee.

He was knighted by Queen Elizabeth II in 1990 for services to Scottish industry. In 2001 Japan awarded him the Order of the Rising Sun for creating business links between Scotland and Japan.

In later life he lived at 6 Norwood Terrace in Dundee.

He died in his Dundee home on 7 July 2005 and is buried in the Western Cemetery, Dundee. The simple grave lies against the second upper terrace wall, towards the west.

== Family ==
He was married to Dorothy Alice Warner.

== Gallery ==
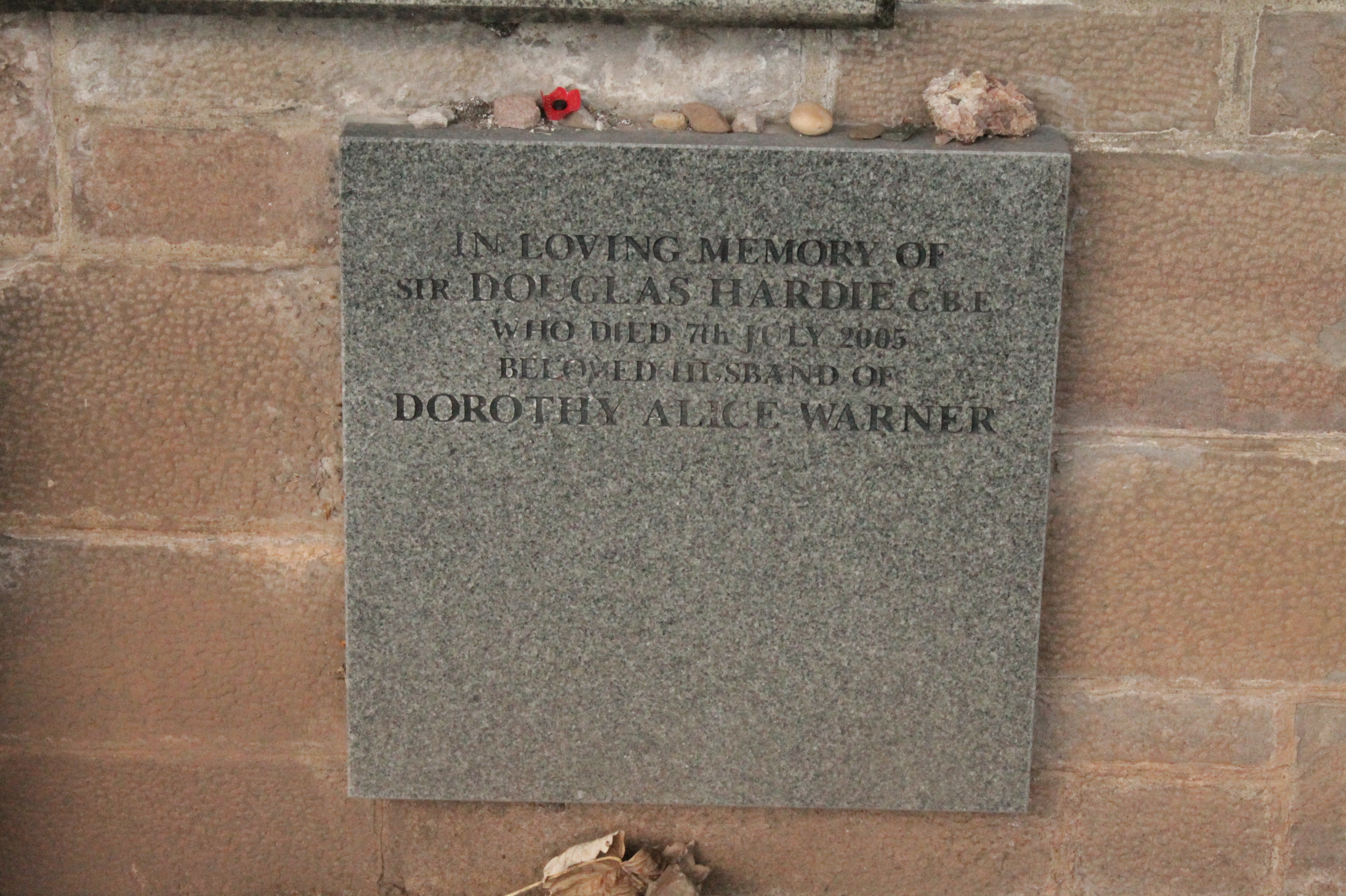
The grave of Sir Douglas Hardie, Western Cemetery, Dundee

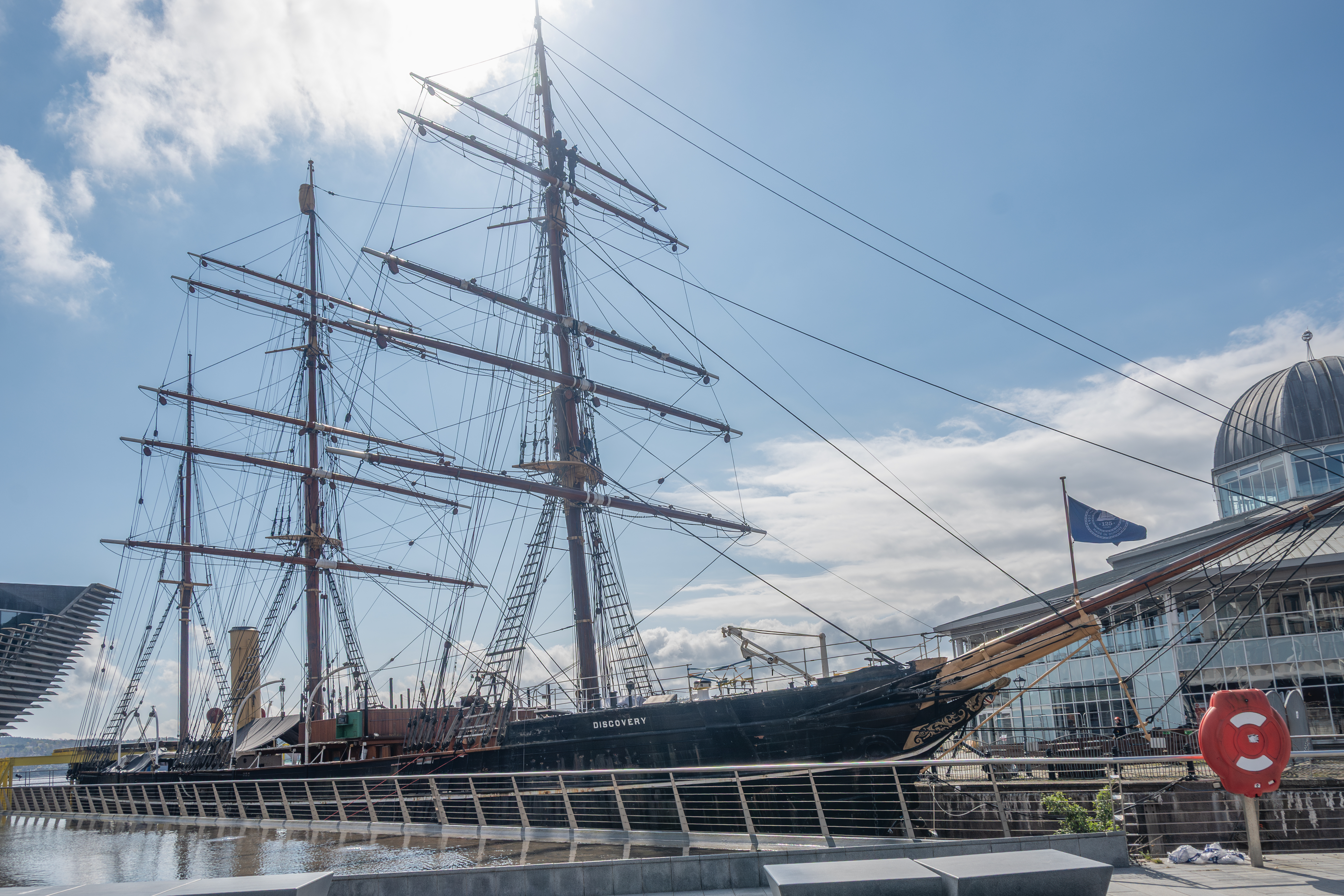
RRS Discovery, in Dundee in 2009; Hardie was instrumental in getting it relocated to Dundee.

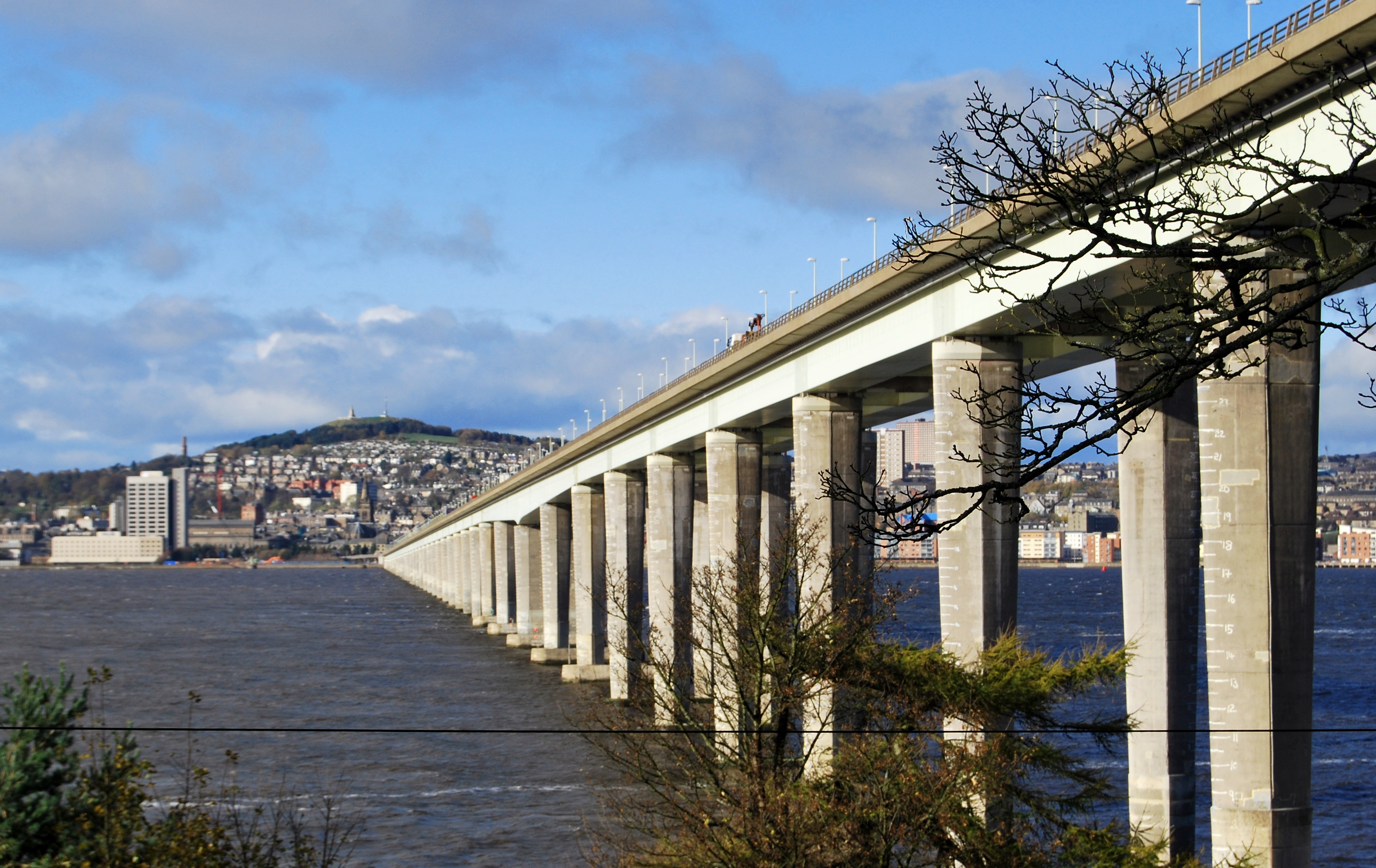
Tay Road Bridge; Hardie instigated its building.
