= Westruther =

Coordinates: 55°44′31″N 2°35′04″W

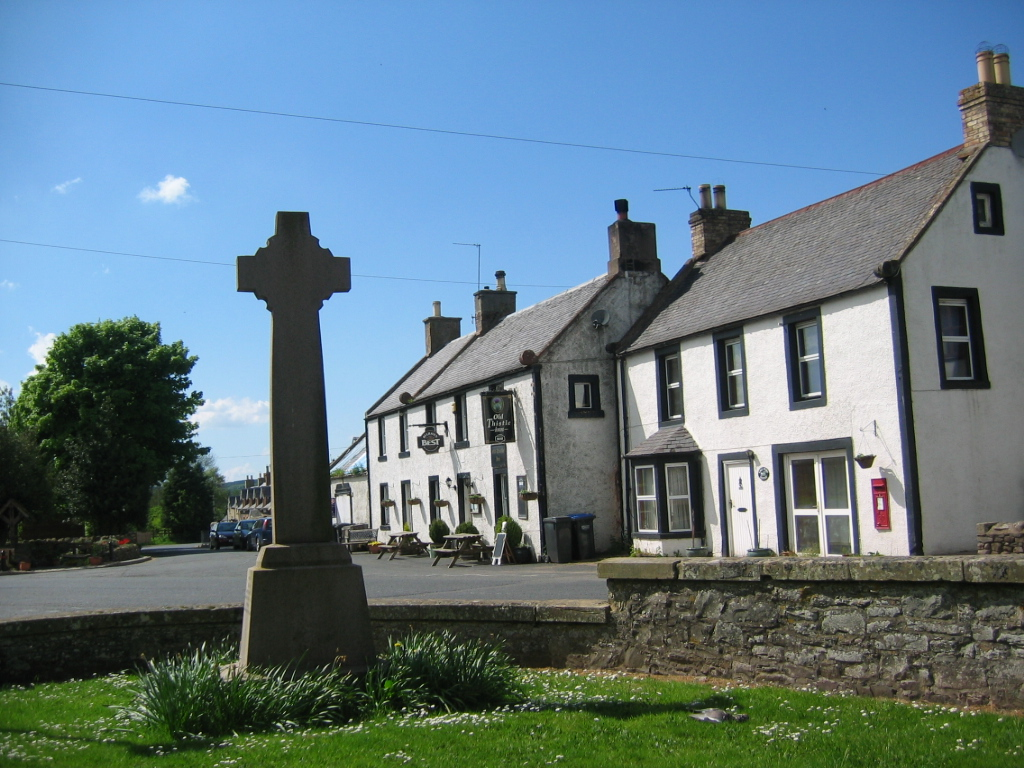
- The village of Westruther

- Location within the Scottish Borders
- OS grid reference: NT633500
- Council area: Scottish Borders
- Lieutenancy area: Berwickshire
- Country: Scotland
- Sovereign state: United Kingdom
- Post town: GORDON
- Postcode district: TD3
- Police: Scotland
- Fire: Scottish
- Ambulance: Scottish
- UK Parliament: Berwickshire, Roxburgh and Selkirk
- Scottish Parliament: Ettrick, Roxburgh and Berwickshire

Westruther is a village on the B6465, in the Scottish Borders area of Scotland, on the lower slopes of the Lammermuir Hills, in the former Berwickshire. The largest town nearby is Gordon.

Places nearby include Duns, Greenlaw, the Lammermuir Hills, Longformacus and the Watch Water Reservoir.

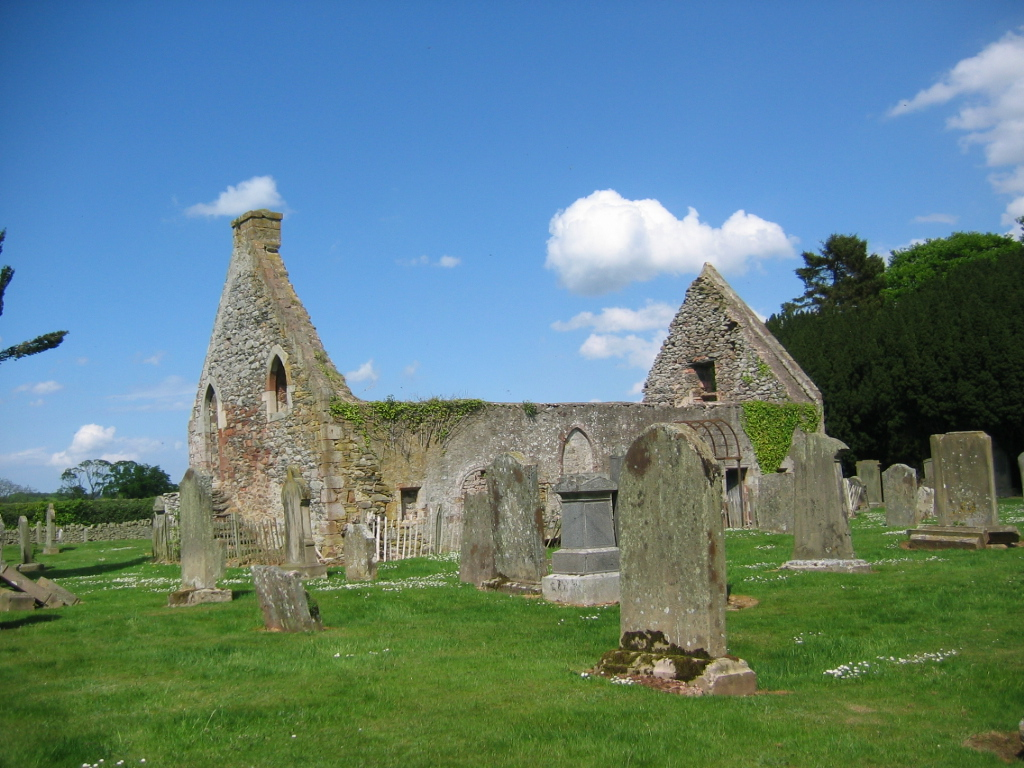
The Auld Kirk at Westruther

The ruined kirk dates from 1649 and contains the tombs of the Spottiswoode family. A prominent member of the family was Alicia Ann Spottiswoode a.k.a. Lady John Scott of "Annie Laurie" fame. There is a stained glass window in her honour in the "new" kirk dating from 1834.

Very Rev William Wilson (1808-1888) Moderator of the General Assembly of the Free Church of Scotland in 1866 was born and raised in the village.

Westruther was the name of the Spottiswoode family home, taken down between the First and Second World War.

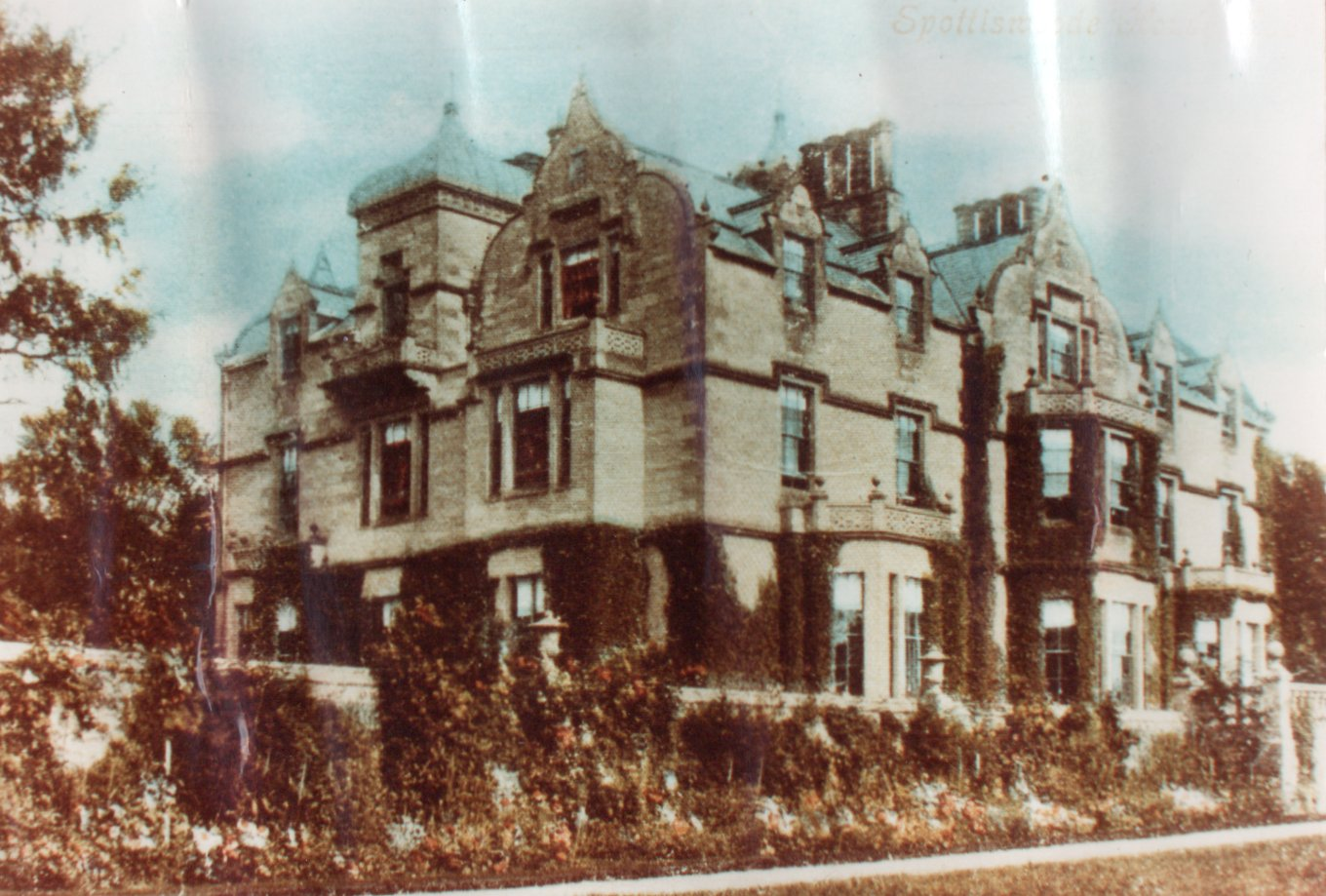
The Spottiswoode's Westruther House family home, long since demolished

== See also ==
- List of places in the Scottish Borders
