= Henry Boase =

Henry Boase (1763– 8 April 1827) was a banker and writer from Cornwall, England.

== Life ==
Boase was the fourth son of Arthur Boase (born 1698), of Madron, a parish in west Cornwall, who died August 1780, by Jane, daughter of Henry Lugg. He was born at Madron on 3 June 1763, and in 1785 went from Penzance to Roscoff, in Brittany, in a fishing-boat, to proceed to Morlaix, where he stayed for some time, and acquired a knowledge of French. Arthur Boase, who came originally from the parish of Paul, is known as a speaker of the Cornish language having taught his children the numerals, Lord's Prayer and many phrases and proverbs in that language.

Not finding any business opening in Cornwall, Boase went to London, where he obtained a situation as corresponding clerk in the banking house of Messrs. Ransom, Morland, & Hammersley in 1788. This house had an extensive continental connection, and after the flight of Louis XVI in 1791 a large part of the funds for the support of the emigrant clergy and nobility passed through their hands. Through his knowledge of French, Boase was able to be of service to his employers; he was promoted to be chief clerk in 1792, and seven years later he became the managing partner.

During his residence in London he was acquainted with Granville Sharp, Robert Owen, and other philanthropists; was a leading member of the London Missionary Society; and took part in the foundation of the British and Foreign Bible Society, in conjunction with the Rev. Thomas Charles, of Bala, whom he came to know while distributing, as Mrs Palmer's banker, her donation of £1,000 to the poor beneficed clergy of Wales.

Boase was also interested in the formation of schools on the system of Joseph Lancaster.

In poor health, Boase in 1809 retired from the business and went to live at Penzance. There he became a partner in the Penzance Union Bank; served the office of mayor in 1816; aided John Ayrton Paris and Ashhurst Majendie to found the Royal Geological Society of Cornwall; took an active share in promoting the Penzance Public Library, and furnished to Sir Thomas Bernard valuable evidence as to the pernicious effects of the duties on salt. In 1821 he was elected a fellow of the Royal Society of Literature.

He married, 26 October 1794, Anne, the only child of Matthew Craige of Walsall, by whom he left a large family, including the geologist Henry Samuel Boase. He died at Alverton, Penzance, 8 April 1827.

== Works ==
Boase published:

1. Remarks on the Impolicy of repealing the Bank Restriction Bill 1802
2. Guineas, an unnecessary and expensive Incumbrance on Commerce 1802, 2nd edition 1803
3. A Letter to the Right Hon. Lord King in Defence of the Conduct of the Directors of the Banks of England and Ireland 1804
4. The Disadvantage of the new Plan of Finance 1807
5. Remarks on the new Doctrine concerning the supposed Depreciation of our Currency 1811

== Sources ==
- G. C. Boase, ‘Boase, Henry (1763–1827)’, rev. Robert Brown, Oxford Dictionary of National Biography, Oxford University Press, 2004; online edn, May 2006 accessed 15 Nov 2007
