= Sam Boaz =

American jurist (1917–2013)

Sam Boaz (1917 – February 8, 2013) was an American jurist.

After graduating from University of Tennessee College of Law, Boaz served in the United States Foreign Service and was stationed in the United Kingdom serving at the United States Embassy. He then returned to Tennessee and practiced law in Clarksville, Tennessee. He served in the Tennessee House of Representatives 1963-1967 as a Democrat. He then served on the Montgomery County, Tennessee criminal court and then served on the Tennessee Court of Criminal Appeals.
