= Carlos Thorne =

Peruvian novelist, writer, and lawyer (1923–2021)

En las fauces de las fieras...

Carlos Thorne (March 11, 1923 – September 1, 2021) was a Peruvian novelist, writer and lawyer. He is regarded as one of the most original and innovative Peruvian writers of the second half of the 20th century. This is due to his unique blend of avant garde flashback techniques, following Malcolm Lowry and James Joyce, with historical detail and accuracy, to the point of reproducing the Spanish of the Conquistadores.

== Life and works ==
Thorne was born in Lima, where he studied law and philosophy. After a successful career as lawyer and some excursions into politics, he decided to devote his life to literature and academic research, writing books and becoming professor in law at the Universidad Nacional Mayor de San Marcos de Lima (UNMSM), the oldest in the Americas. He has been visiting lecturer both in literature and law in the universities of Columbia, Salamanca, Uppsala, King's College London, Liverpool and Complutense.

Perhaps his best known contribution to Latin American novel is his Peruvian trilogy. Papá Lucas (1987), is a novel centered on the war against Chile in the 1880s. Next, El señor de Lunahuaná (1994), which is devoted to the wars of independence from the 1810s and 1820s. Finally, El encomendero de la adarga de plata (1999), the most experimental of the three, is a powerful evocation of the Spanish conquest written in 17th-century Spanish and set during the Inca siege of Cuzco in 1536. In his books the reader gets caught from the first pages in a world of wonder, passion and violence of a strange beauty and poetry. As such, he is seen by his peers and by the critics as on a par with Alejo Carpentier and Gabriel García Marquez and thus as one of the main living exponents of the "real maravilloso" (Magic realism) Latin American novel tradition and of the Latin American historical novel. Viva la república (1981), his first novel, is a highly achieved satire of the Peruvian military dictators of the 1970s that he passionately opposed.

Thorne died in Lima in September 2021, at the age of 98.

== Novels ==
Viva la república (1981)

Papá Lucas (1987)

El señor de Lunahuaná (1994)

El encomendero de la adarga de plata (1999)

Yo, San Martín (2011)

== Tales and Short Stories ==
Los días fáciles (1959)

Mañana Mao (1964)

La diosa Marina (1996)

En las fauces de las Fieras (2004)

Cuentos completos (2005)

País Violento (2016)

== Essays ==
Palabras de Utopía (1983)

Páginas de Extramuros (1993)

El Hilo de la Razón – First edition (1995)

Los oficios de la Lengua (2001)

La generación del 50 y el Periodismo (2007)

El Hilo de la Razón – Augmented Second Edition (2015)

== Other writings ==
La interpretación de la ley. Cuestiones Metodológicas (1989)
