= Henry Samuel Boase =

British geologist and author

Henry Samuel Boase FRS (2 September 1799 – 5 May 1883) was a 19th-century British geologist and author.

== Life and work ==
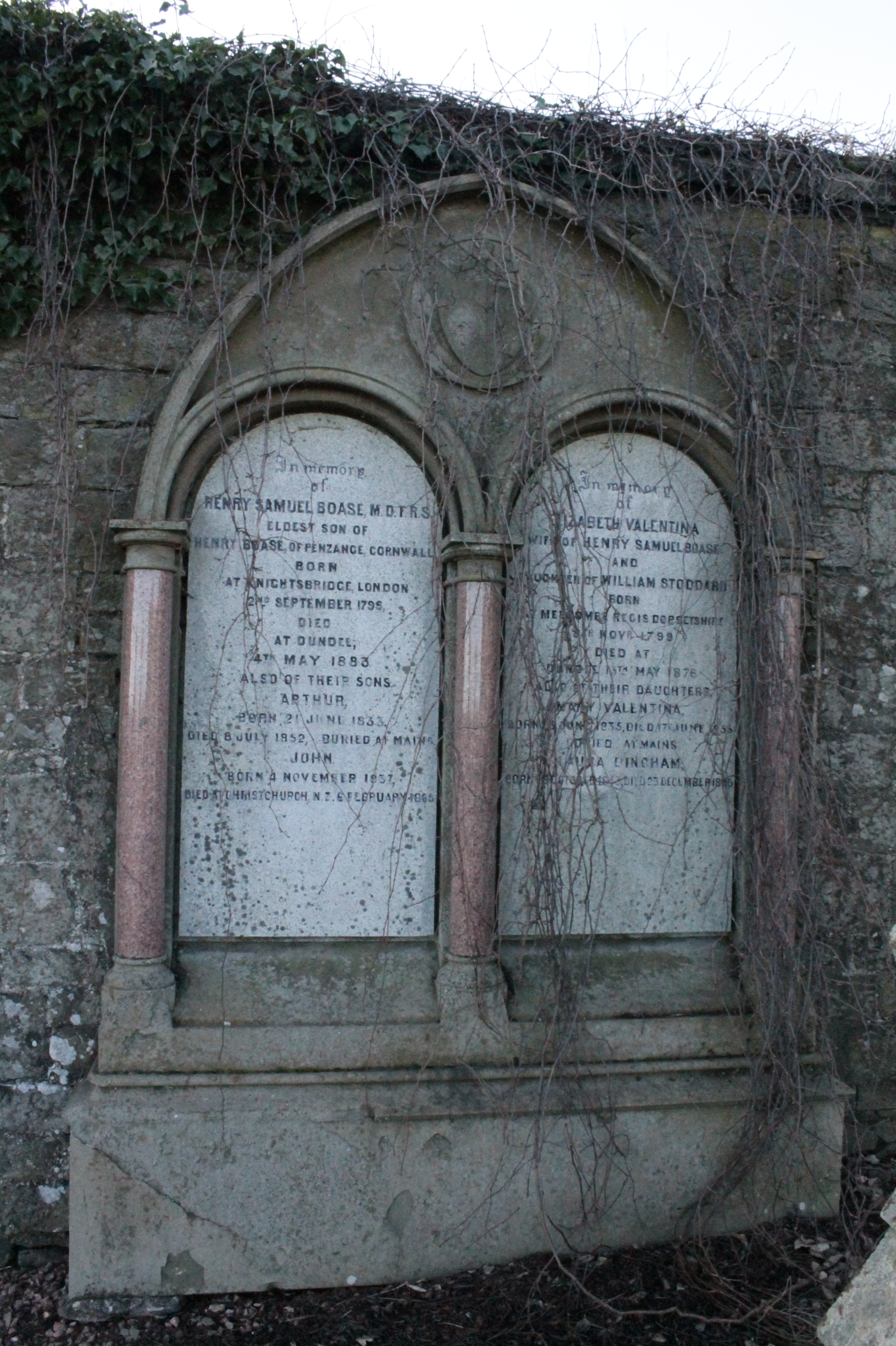
The grave of Henry Samuel Boase, Western Cemetery, Dundee

Boase was born in Knightsbridge, London on 2 September 1799, the eldest son of Henry Boase (1763–1827), banker, of Madron, Cornwall. Henry Boase, the son, was educated at Blundell's School in Tiverton and then in Dublin, where he studied chemistry. He later proceeded to Edinburgh University and took the degree of M.D. in 1821. He then worked for some years as a medical practitioner at Penzance; there geology engaged his particular attention, and he became secretary of the Royal Geological Society of Cornwall, and a committee member of the Royal Cornwall Polytechnic Society.

The results of Boase's geological observations were embodied in his Treatise on Primary Geology (1834), a work of considerable merit in regard to the older crystalline and igneous rocks and the subject of mineral veins. In 1837 he moved to London, where he remained for about a year, being elected a Fellow of the Royal Society in 1837. In 1838 he became a partner in a firm of bleachers at Dundee, and managing director in 1846. He then lived at 5 Fleuchar Craig in Dundee.

Boase was a Christian creationist, he authored A Few Words on Evolution and Creation, 1883. The book was negatively reviewed by George Romanes in the Nature journal.

Until 1865 he worked for the Turnbull brothers at the Claverhouse Bleachfield.

He then went into partnership with George Ireland purchasing the Wellfield Works at Lilybank to create Ireland & Boase, flax and jute spinners. They made tarpaulins and sacks.

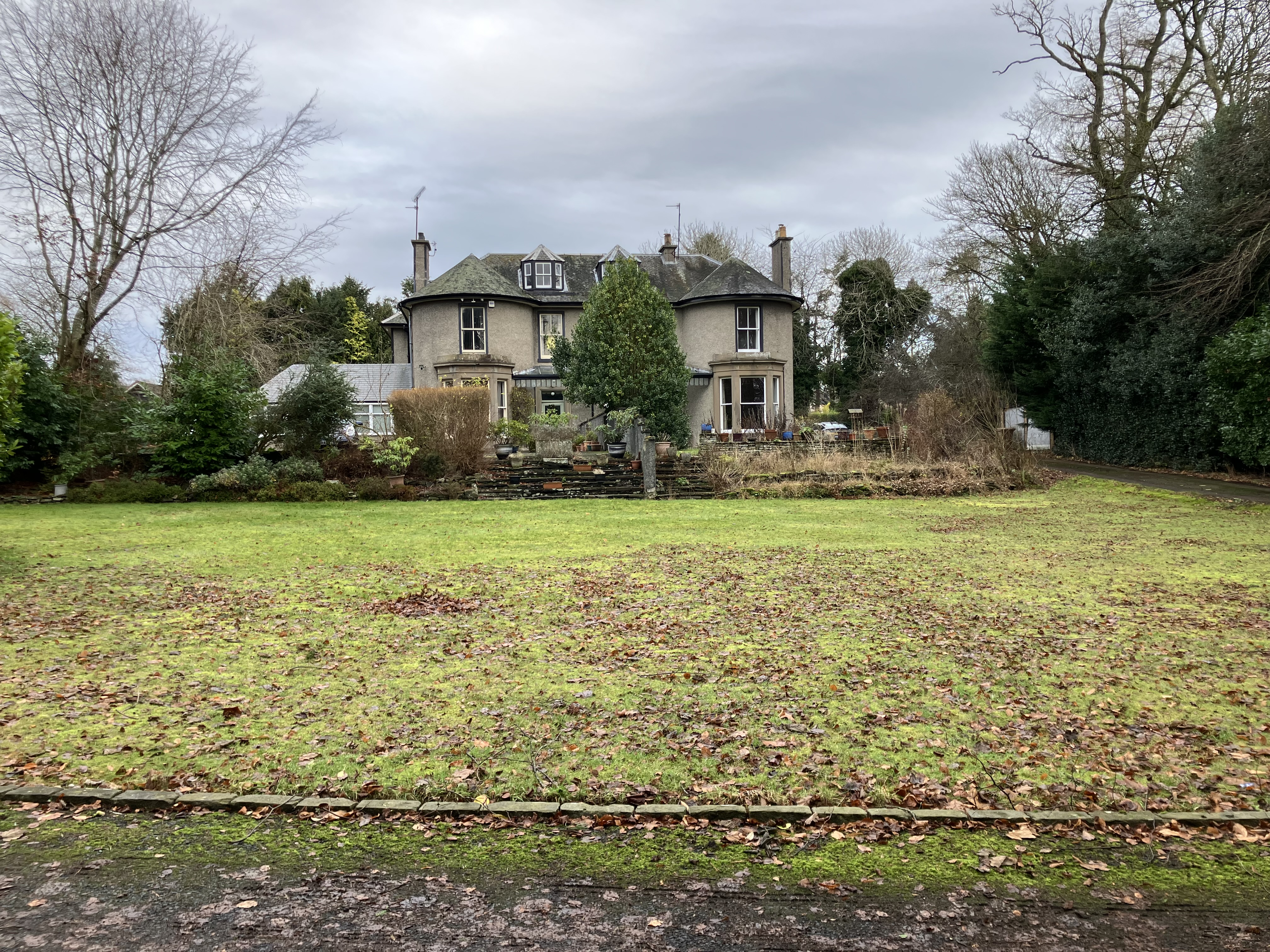
Claverhouse Mansion, photo taken Dec. 17, 2025

From 1851-1870 he lived with his family at Claverhouse Mansion in Dundee.

By 1870 he was running three companies: Boase & Co, Ireland & Boase and Small & Boase. Boase retired in 1871 but stayed in Dundee. He died at Seafield House on Magdalen Place in Dundee, close to the River Tay, on 5 May 1883. He is buried in the Western Cemetery, Dundee. The grave lies on the west wall just before the enclosed mausoleum on that side.

== Family ==
He married Elizabeth Valentina Stoddard (1799–1876) daughter of William Stoddard of Melcombe Regis in Dorsetshire. They had ten children including Mary Valentina Boase and Laura Bingham Boase. His son Alfred Boase (b.1829) married Ellen Bradley Boase, Henry's niece. Arthur Boase (1833–1852) was born in Dundee and educated at Glenalmond College.

His great nephew Captain Edgar Leslie Boase was killed at High Wood in the First World War serving with the 4th battalion Black Watch. He stood as the Unionist candidate against Churchill in the 1915 election in Dundee.

== Selected publications ==
- A Treatise on Primary Geology (1834)
- The Philosophy of Nature (1860)
- The Second Adam, the Seed of the Woman (1876)
- A Few Words on Evolution and Creation (1883)

== Notes ==
Attribution:
