= Preston Watson =

Scottish aviation pioneer (1880–1915)

- Born: 17 October 1880; Dundee, Scotland
- Died: 30 June 1915 (aged 35); Heathfield, East Sussex, England
- Occupations: Aviator; Aeronaut
- Parent(s): Thomas Watson and his wife Jane Yeaman

Preston Albert Watson (17 October 1880 – 30 June 1915) was a Scottish aviation pioneer, who conceived his own original method of controlling an aeroplane in flight. This was his rocking wing method of lateral control, which consisted of a secondary smaller wing mounted above the main wing on an A-frame that could pivot about its longitudinal axis. Watson's method of lateral control was applied by him in three different aeroplanes; the first was built in late 1909, the second in July 1910 and his third in 1913.

On 16 March 1915, Watson gained his Royal Aero Club Certificate No. 1,117 (equivalent of a pilot's licence) with the London and Provincial School at the London Aerodrome, Hendon, having sought a commission with the Royal Naval Air Service with the outbreak of the First World War in 1914. On 30 June 1915 he was killed when the Caudron G.3 aeroplane he was flying disintegrated in flight and crashed in Dunlye Field, a few miles from the Cross-in-Hand Hotel near Heathfield, Sussex. Watson is buried in Dundee's Western Cemetery.

Preston Watson's achievements have been clouded by claims of powered flight before the Wright brothers. This originated from his younger brother James Watson, who brought it to the public's greater attention in an article published in the Manchester Guardian newspaper in December 1953. There was an article in The Scots magazine in October 1953 released by one J.D. Leslie, but it is dismissed owing to inaccuracies. Since then, Preston's name has been associated with this false claim and his actual work in promoting aviation is often overlooked.

This claim has been repeatedly proven to be false, but the myth frequently reappears in Scottish newspaper articles and most recently in a book published in 2014 with the support of the Dundee Museum of Transport titled The Pioneer Flying Achievements of Preston Watson by Alistair W. Blair and Alistair Smith.

== Early history ==
He was born in Dundee, Scotland on 17 October 1880, the son of Mr Thomas Watson of Balgowan and his wife Jane Yeaman. His father was partner in Watson & Philip a wholesale food distributor in Dundee.

He was a pupil of the High School of Dundee and showed considerable interest in things mechanical from an early age. Young Preston possessed an analytical mind, and quite often, he, according to the Sunday, 27 October 1984 edition of The Courier and Advertiser newspaper;

...would sometimes sit overlooking the Firth of Tay and watch seagulls in flight. "One day too, we will be able to fly", he is said to have remarked prophetically, only to be chided by his brother, James (later his great aviation ally) and friends for an idea that was "just daft"…

It was whilst studying engineering at University College, Dundee that his interest in aeronautics flourished, but there was little to read on the emerging science of aviation. If aviation was to become the field in which he was going to start a career, he would have to do his own research.

His brother James Yeaman Watson was to later recount in the December 1955 issue of Aeronautics magazine that;

[Preston] studied the flight of gulls, caught many of them, put small weights on their heads, glued their wings into the position he wished, and was frequently seen by passers-by dropping them over the road bridge, which crossed the railway line at the west end of the Dundee Esplanade.

According to the late Mr James Manson, who worked as a labourer with Watson's father's food produce business, Messrs Watson and Philip, Preston built small model aeroplanes and dropped them from the bridge at Ninewells.

On 25 October 1907 Watson applied for a patent that, "...relates to flying machines, the object being to raise and propel a machine through the air without aerostats." Accepted in its entirety nearly a year later, Patent No.23,553 of 1907, titled "Watson's Flying Machines" comprises eight pages of descriptions of an indigenous rotary-wing means of creating lift and five illustrations to which the description pages are keyed. These show different configurations of aircraft using the same rotary aerofoil devices that resembled the sheathing mechanism of a combine harvester. No evidence survives to suggest Watson began constructing any of the bizarre creations in the patent.

Accepted in its entirety on 8 October 1908, by that time Watson's ideas on what constituted successful flight, and specifically how lift was achieved had changed dramatically from his patent. In July 1908 Watson published the pamphlet Power Necessary in Flight (John Leng & Co. Ltd. Dundee, 1908), which contained his theories on; "...the best curvature of an aerodrome [sic], and, further, the result of a calculation regarding the best proportion of the weight of wings to weight of structure for the attainment of flight with the least horse-power."

Influenced by Frederick William Lanchester's paper titled "Aerodynamics", constituting the first volume of a complete work on aerial flight published in December 1907, Watson's work contains an analytical approach to aerodynamics, far removed from the outlandish theories he expressed in his first patent. Watson's introduction mentions that he had read Lanchester's work, stating that their findings are similar, but that he arrived at his theories independently.

His next patent represented the body of his aeronautical work that he spent the rest of his life researching; his rocking wing concept of lateral control. Applied for on 1 January 1909, the complete specification is dated 23 July 1909 and was left with the Patent Office a day later and accepted on 16 December that year. Patent No.47 of 1909 comprises three pages of descriptions and a single page with an illustration of the rocking wing concept as applied to a theoretical aeroplane.

From examining the illustration supplied with the patent and surviving photographs of Watson's aeroplanes, it is plainly evident that he had fully intended on constructing an aircraft based on his patent. Exactly when he completed his first aeroplane is not known, but on page 400 in the 2 November 1909 issue of The Aero magazine is the following statement:

At the secluded little village of Forgandenny, Perthshire, near Preston, A. Watson, a well-known motorist of Dundee, has built a machine to his own designs. Mr Watson does not wish details of his aeroplane to be made public till he has tested it in practice, which he hopes to do within the next few days.

Although clearly a typographical error with regards to the location of "the secluded little village of Forgendenny, Perthshire, near Preston" and Watson's name, this article seems to confirm a likely completion time period of his first full size aeroplane based on his rocking wing patent.

== Rocking wings ==
Although somewhat neglected by aviation historians, Preston Watson's aeronautical experiments are contemporary with those of better known British pioneers, such as Alliott Verdon Roe and Geoffrey de Havilland. In many ways Watson's experiments are of at least equal historic interest today as those of his contemporaries, since his primary focus was developing an alternative means of controlling an aeroplane in flight – his "rocking wing" method of lateral control.

Watson is known to have built three aeroplanes incorporating rocking wings, only two of which successfully became airborne under their own power.

It is likely that Watson's second patent, "Improvements in Flying Machines" dated 1 January 1909 was the first published description of Watson's rocking wing theory of lateral control, the function of which in a practicable sense is described by him as, "above [the main] plane...and carried by the frame of the machine is a rocking aeroplane...capable of rocking about a fore and aft central axle..."

"The pivot...is above the fore and aft central axis of the main plane and depending from the rocking plane and at right angles to it is a lever...fixed rigidly to such rocking plane. This lever is fixed in so far that it can tilt the plane...to one side or the other..." The actuation of which by the pilot induces the rocking motion of the wing.

When in flight the rocking wing functions in the following manner, "when the rocking aeroplane...is tilted out of the horizontal...by moving the lever...to one side, the normal pressure of the rocking aeroplane...is inclined out of the vertical and gives rise to a horizontal component pulling its axle...to one side relative to the line of flight."

"The [aircraft is] thus caused to rotate about the line of flight, that is to say, the [rocking wing] becomes tilted about the line of flight and out of the horizontal. The normal pressure of the [main plane] is thus inclined out of the vertical and gives rise to a horizontal component pulling the [aircraft] to one side of the line of flight."

To climb and descend in the aircraft, the vertically mounted lever, "...is moved fore and aft, thus causing the front edge of the rudder [tailplane, none of Watson's aeroplanes were fitted with a vertical rudder. The Wrights also initially referred to their horizontal stabilisers as horizontal rudders] to be moved downwards or upwards."

Because of the dual actuation of the control lever, "...the [rocking wing] and the [tailplane] can be moved so as to cause the machine to move up and down while at the same time moving to the one side or the other, that is to say that by simply moving the hand which actuates the lever in any desired direction and the trim altered."

Watson's declaration as a conclusion to the patent is in two points, as follows:

1. "In aeroplanes the use of a rocking plane situated on a higher level than the main plane, for preserving lateral stability and for steering right and left and controlled by a lever which also operates the horizontal rudder as described and illustrated on the drawings annexed."
2. "In aeroplanes the combination of a fixed main plane with an upper rocking plane as described and for the purposes set forthwith."

Despite Watson's firm belief in his system of control, the reality behind it, however ingenious, was that it was no more efficient that wing warping or the use of ailerons in its aerodynamic effect on an aeroplane in flight. Prompted by Charles Gibbs-Smith, when analysed by aerodynamic experts at the Royal Aeronautical Society in the late 1950s, it was found that the rocking wing had a significant disadvantage; it had the effect of a single combined aileron and rudder.

To execute a banked turn from flying straight and level, the rocking wing worked moderately effectively, but when the aeroplane's lateral equilibrium had been compromised, tipping the rocking wing in the opposite direction to the down-going wing to right itself had a tendency to yaw the aircraft in that direction. In effect, the rocking wing did not fully assist in correcting conditions of instability since the pilot had no means with which to induce or correct a yawing motion. Another possible reason behind the rocking wing idea not progressing beyond Watson's experiments was that it could only be applied to relatively light and small aircraft.

Had Preston Watson survived, it is possible that with continual experience flying his aeroplanes he would have thought up an ingenious solution to this problem. Although he would have had to forsake, in his mind, the biggest advantage of his system over contemporaries, the simplicity of operation of the rocking wing method (by a single control lever for pitch and roll), by perhaps adding another actuating device to adequately control his aeroplane.

Despite this however, the rocking wing means of lateral control as Watson proposed it, although it had no precedent in aviation's fledgling years, its influence and impact on history have proven to be negligible.

== Aircraft ==
It is known that Preston Watson constructed three powered aeroplanes, of which only two were able to become airborne under their own power.

There have also been claims that Watson also built and flew an unpowered "Wright Type" glider, but there is little substantial evidence to support this; Preston Watson himself never made the claim and reports of a glider only emerged after James Watson admitted that the claim to powered flight before the Wrights in 1903 was false and the machine Preston flew that year was a glider in the December 1955 issue of Aeronautics magazine. While he might have begun constructing a glider at some stage in his life, no evidence can be found that verifies the claim he flew it.

=== First aeroplane ===
Based on Watson's rocking wing patent, it is assumed that his first powered machine was completed around mid 1909 since it is almost exactly like the illustration that accompanies the patent. Built within the workshops of the Tay Motor Boat and Engine Company of Dundee, the Watson No.1 had the upper wing being approximately one half the span of the lower wing. The main wings were in two separate sections, between which the pilot sat. He had no instrumentation of any sort. The upper wing was mounted at the apex of an "A" frame, with the main wing forming the cross bar of the "A" and with long skis being fitted at its base.

There are rumours that Watson acquired his first aircraft's engine from celebrated Brazilian aviator Alberto Santos Dumont. This was a four-cylinder horizontally opposed engine manufactured in small numbers by Dutheil Chalmers & Cie, Paris, France, of unusual layout; the propeller was mounted between two horizontally opposed banks of cylinders.

Despite the fitting of the Dutheil Chalmers engine, Preston Watson's No.1 aeroplane remained firmly earthbound, and he placed it in store in a shed on the property of Mr James Bell at Rossie, Forgandenney, about 25 miles west of Dundee. A year later Watson gave it to a group of local enthusiasts from the Dundee Model Aero Club, founded in November 1909. David Urquhart, the founder of the Dundee Model Aero Club and two friends, David Robertson and William Gibb, recounted in 1961 how the Dutheil Chalmers motor was removed and the aeroplane was converted into a glider in the club house used by the modellers.

By June 1911 the glider had been completed and several flights had been made from a rise on the property of a Mr George Ballingall of Newton, Wormit, in Fife, Scotland. However within five months the members of the Dundee Model Aero Club were constructing a new glider. What they did with the earlier one is not known. .

=== Second aeroplane ===
In his second aeroplane, Preston Watson achieved successful powered flight in a design that appeared to vindicate his theories. Initially hoped to have entered the No.2 in the Lanark Airshow, only the second international air meeting held in the UK, his first flights in it were carried out in the first two weeks of August 1910 at Errol, Perthshire, having missed out on entering the event owing to a fractured propeller during its very first engine run. As with his first aeroplane, the No.2 was built by the Tay Motor Boat and Engine Company, in July 1910. The earliest photographs unearthed so far of Watson's No.2 machine in flight are dated from 1912, although Watson carried out successful flying trials throughout August and September 1910.

Constructed from bamboo with its flying surfaces covered in canvas like his first aeroplane, Watson's No.2 was structurally similar to its predecessor, which lends credence to the fact that Watson's first rocking wing aircraft did not fly. The two aircraft shared the same dimensions, wing plan and box kite tail surfaces, although the "A" frame centre section of the No.2 differed slightly from the No.1 in bracing details. Watson's new aeroplane was powered by a 1910 three cylinder 30 hp Humber engine.

A number of accounts state that Preston, his younger brother James and Archie Dickie, who had allegedly gone to Paris to secure a Dutheil Chalmers engine from Alberto Santos-Dumont for Watson's previous aeroplane, all flew the machine at Errol at this time. The pictures published in the 15 May 1914 issue of Flight magazine, which captions the images as having been taken in 1912 have been mis-quoted by James as having been taken in 1908, but the No.2 was built in 1910 and its 30 hp Humber engine was not produced until that year. On being given this piece of rather pointed evidence to the contrary by prominent aviation author Charles Gibbs-Smith, James Watson promptly changed his story.

As with his first aeroplane, it is safe to assume that Watson's primary concern about the No.2 would have been its powerplant; above all other considerations, he had to equip it with an engine that was able to get it into the air. Quite probably, his choice of engine was driven by cost and availability. As with his first aeroplane, the fate of the Watson No.2 is unknown, although it was probably scrapped with the outbreak of the Great War.

=== Third aeroplane ===
Probably buoyed by the success of achieving powered flight in one of his own aeroplanes, Watson built a third machine, his last, in 1913. His third aeroplane was deliberately designed to supersede his No.2 in capability, since his theories had been proven in flight. Compared to his previous machines, his No.3 was a different beast, although it still incorporated the same layout with a smaller upper wing, and lacked a definite fuselage.

It represented a more professional approach to Watson's aeroplane building, being of considerably smarter appearance than his earlier efforts. It was sturdier, the proliferation of bracing wires were testimony to this. Constructed of metal, possibly steel tubing as opposed to bamboo in his earlier aeroplanes, although James Manson claims the tubing was duralumin. Its wings were of conventional design; the bracing struts were fitted with streamlined aerofoil shaped fairings, made from aluminium or wood and covered in fabric, canvas according to Manson, which was sewn into place by himself.

Watson's big No.3 was powered by a British Anzani 45 hp six cylinder two-row radial engine.

From 1 January to 1 July 1914, L'Union pour la Sécurité en Aéroplane organisation held the first Concours de La Sécurité en Aéroplanes at Buc aerodrome, near Paris, France in which some 56 aircraft were entered with the intention of displaying advances in safety devices for aeroplanes from a design standpoint.

Watson's No.3 was the only British participant, but was disqualified.

In the 7 July 1915 issue of The Aeroplane, as an obituary to Watson, the following records one reason why the No.3 might have been ruled out of the competition; "Last year Mr Watson took the machine to France and entered it into the 'Concours de La Sécurité', or Security Competition. The machine was not a success, partly no doubt, as Mr Watson claimed, because of its being underpowered. Nevertheless, it did at time get off the ground for short distances."

One pilot under Watson's service during the Concours competition was a Mr S. Summerfield of Melton Mowbray. Mr Summerfield recalled that the No.3 handled well once he had gotten used to the novel means of control, but the machine was ruled out of the competition, "...for no apparent reason...", as recorded in the 3 July 1914 issue of Flight. In the book British Aircraft before the Great War (Schiffer, Atglen, PA 2001), the authors offer the following reason for the No.3's disqualification: "...the pilot was classified as a novice and excluded."

In March 1915, during an interview with a Flight magazine reporter, Watson mentioned in passing that he had fitted floats to the No.3. It is most likely that they were flotation devices that provided buoyancy in the event of the aircraft ditching during over-water flights. Watson said that he intended on carrying out further experiments with the No.3 after the end of the war, since he had applied for a commission with the Royal Naval Air Service.

According to James Manson, Watson's mechanic and sometimes pilot of the No.3, it was broken up around the time of the outbreak of war in 1914, but based on the Flight magazine piece above, Watson retained the machine after he had enrolled into service with the RNAS in 1915. It was likely to have been scrapped after his untimely death.

== Last year of life ==
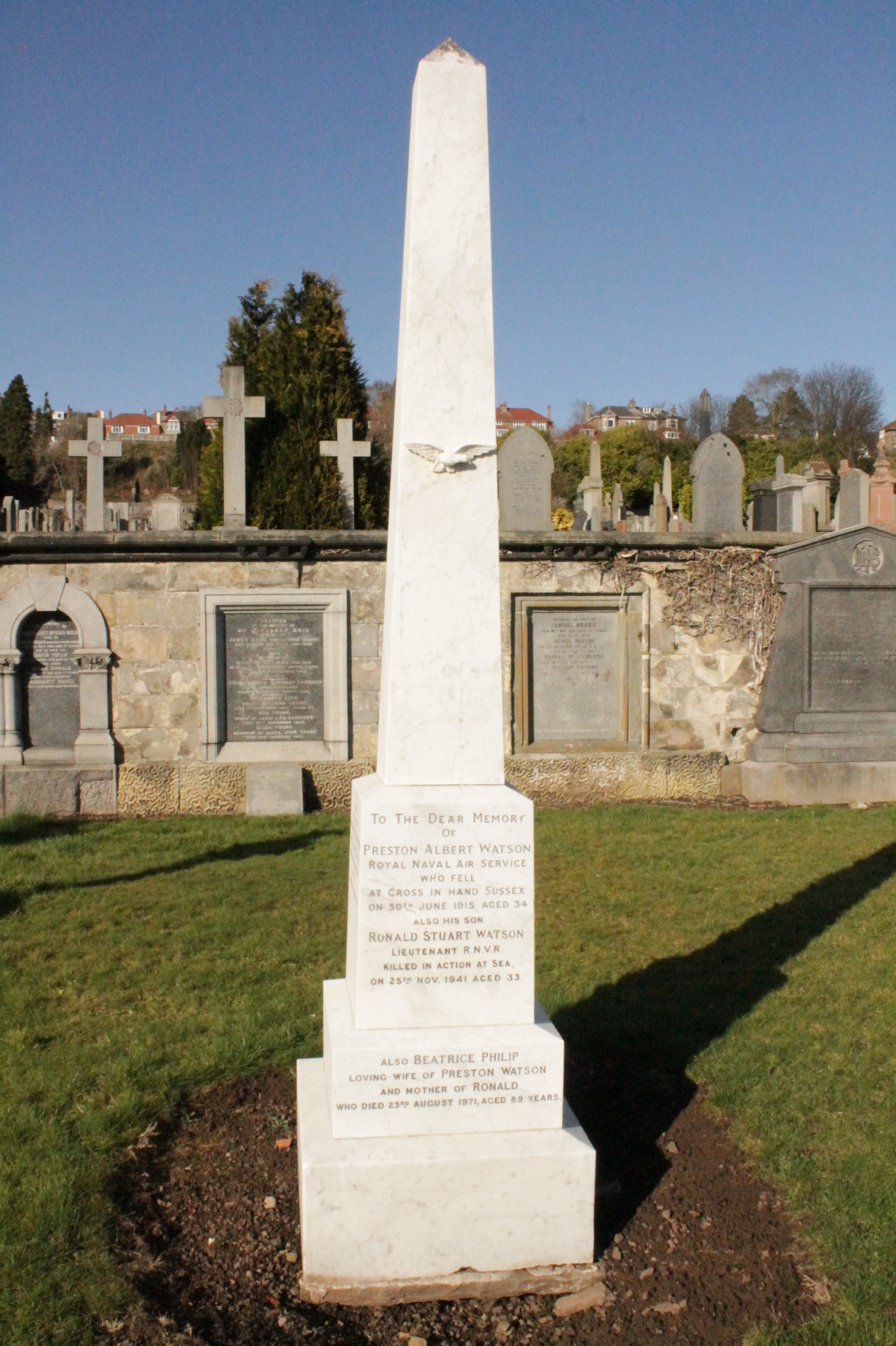
The grave of Preston Watson, Western Cemetery, Dundee

Nowadays, the efforts of the competitors and judges at the Concours are all-but forgotten, but many of the features pioneered at the event were to resurface on modern aircraft. For Preston Watson, the event proved less than successful, but it illustrated his dedication to his work. One positive consequence of his entry was that his theories became known to a wider audience after the article in Flight magazine that year, where he went into detail about his rocking wing method of control.

With the declaration of the First World War in August 1914, Watson hoped to volunteer for service with the Royal Flying Corps – he had held a commission as a volunteer with the Fife and Forfar Yeomanry, but was refused, being described as too old (at age 34) to fly. In a letter to his wife Beatrice, written presumably in the later months of 1914, published in Alistair W. Blair and Alistair Smith's book The Pioneer Flying Achievements of Preston Watson, Preston explains a meeting with Lithuanian born Leo Anatole Jouques, employed by the War Office to manufacture aeroplanes under licence by his firm Jouques Aviation Works at Willesden, London, and apparently well connected, who suggested to him he might be able to assist him with a commission with the Royal Aircraft Factory at Farnborough.

According to letters written by Watson and published in the aforementioned book, he showed Jouques photographs and written details of his rocking wing experiments and aeroplanes. Jouques seemed genuinely interested in the design and claimed he would organise for Watson to give a public demonstration of the machine to the War Office. Evidently this did not take place and Watson was also less-than-enthused by an offer by Jouques to manufacture (presumably) the No.3. Jouques returned to Watson claiming that his wife, who had access to Lord Kitchener and was requesting of him that he gain Watson a commission and that modifications to its undercarriage be made at Jouques' expense before Watson demonstrate the machine to the War Office. Nothing came of any of this, again, presumably because of Watson's own reluctance, as he states in one of the letters that he is "swithering" over the latest offer by Jouques.

One of these letters hints at Watson's own displeasure with his aircraft, although exactly what this might be in regards to is unknown. Was he displeased with his machine's performance at the Concours de La Sécurité en Aéroplanes competition, or was it at the lack of progress with and/or recognition of his experiments as a whole?

Not satisfied with progress with the gaining of a flying commission through official sources, Watson endeavoured to earn his own flying qualification by paying for instruction with the London and Provincial School at the London Aerodrome, Hendon. By the end of December 1914, he had gone solo, having carried out his training in the L & P Biplane; an indigenous aeroplane built by L & P School instructors resembling a Caudron G.3.

On 16 March 1915, Watson was awarded his Royal Aero Club Certificate, No.1,117, the equivalent of achieving a pilot's licence in the L & P Biplane, having achieved it "...in excellent style" according to an entry in the 24 March 1915 issue of The Aeroplane. At the bottom of page 145 in the 26 February 1915 issue of Flight is a photograph of students and instructors of the London and Provincial School; Watson can be seen wearing a leather flying cap standing next to a sheepish looking Clive Collett, later Captain Clive Franklin Collett MC, Great War fighter ace from Spring Creek near Blenheim, New Zealand and the first member of the Royal Flying Corps to parachute out of an aeroplane.

In late March however, despite already possessing his certificate with the L & P School, Watson enrolled for flying training with the Beatty School at Hendon and commenced what is listed as "extra practice" in the 31 March 1915 issue of The Aeroplane magazine, flying that school's Beatty-Wright biplane.

On 30 June 1915, Flight sub-Lieutenant Preston Watson of the Royal Naval Air Service was flying Caudron G.3 3266 between Eastchurch in Kent and Eastbourne, East Sussex, England when his aeroplane "suddenly dived from a great height to the ground", and crashed in Dunlye Field, a few miles from the Cross-in-Hand Hotel near Heathfield. Watson was killed in the accident. He was 34 years old.

Preston Watson was interred on 5 July in the Western Cemetery, Dundee. The grave lies just before the first upper terrace. The white obelisk bears a dove in flight. He was survived by a widow and two young children. What became of his aeroplanes and his research is not known.

What actually happened to cause the Caudron to crash has never been fully explained; some hypothesised that the aircraft suffered structural failure, since a wing was found in an adjoining field. Engine failure was also suggested as a possible cause of the crash. Watson's RNAS casualty card offers no clues, merely stating the time and place he was killed.

== Powered-flight-before-the-Wrights claims ==
Preston Watson's achievements, although not spectacular are today regarded with scepticism because of the erroneous claims of powered-flight-before-the-Wrights in the summer of 1903 that originated from his younger brother James. According to Alistair W. Blair and Alistair Smith in The Pioneer Flying Achievements of Preston Watson, James Watson began collating information on the claim in a letter to the Science Museum, London dated 21 October 1949. In the 15 December 1953 issue of the Manchester Guardian newspaper, James had an article published referencing the claim, although it was not the first public acknowledgement of it. Following this, James Watson approached the Royal Aeronautical Society via a joint dinner with the Royal Aero Club at the Dorchester Hotel, London, commemorating 50 years since the Wright Brothers' first powered flight on 17 December 1903, with evidence, including photographs and eye-witness accounts that Preston Watson flew a powered aeroplane before the Wright Brothers. A further article appeared in the February 1954 issue of Aeronautics magazine titled "The Watson History", in which James Watson re-iterated his claim, although the magazine's editor cautiously advised readers that; "we would say that we are not convinced that Preston Watson can upset existing priority claims for controlled and sustained flight."

Director of the Victoria and Albert Museum and professional aviation researcher Charles Gibbs-Smith vigorously investigated the Watson claim. The presentation of Gibbs-Smith's findings to him eventually forced a change of tack from Watson the Younger. Published in the December 1955 issue of Aeronautics magazine titled "A pioneer in Scotland", James changed his story from that published in the same magazine previously, stating that "Preston's first aeroplane was without an engine" and that "trial flights were made at Errol in the summer of 1903". In a letter to Gibbs-Smith, James also wrote, "I make no claim that the 'machine' Preston used at Errol in 1903 was a powered machine."

=== The Wright Type glider ===
This "confession" gave rise to rumours that Preston had built a "Wright Type glider" at that time, although no such claim had appeared before. A so-called reliable source was found in a close friend of the Watson family, former head of Kings College Dental Department, dental surgeon John Bell Milne, who claimed to have seen Preston's earliest flying machine, but had not witnessed it in flight.

In correspondence with Gibbs-Smith, Bell Milne later described the aircraft as, "...definitely a glider, it had skids. It was of normal biplane build, both wings in the same span. It had an elevator out front." In an interview he gave in 1961, Milne remembered that Watson constructed his glider in, "...late 1903 or early 1904", at the time he and Preston, "...were attending physics classes at University College [Dundee]."

Peculiarly, in a letter to Gibbs-Smith dated 15 August 1957, James Watson discredits Bell Milne's testimony above, advising that because he was not present in 1903, he could not have seen the machine that he and Preston were testing was a rocking-wing aeroplane, criticising the fact that Bell Milne saw a biplane glider that had a front-mounted elevator. Owing to himself claiming that Preston had flown an unpowered aircraft that year in Aeronautics magazine two years earlier and in the later letter to Gibbs-Smith, one wonders whether James was aware of the discrepancies in his own testimonies, as one by one his claims were disproved.

What makes the assertion that Preston Watson built a glider, or any aircraft in 1903 questionable is that James Watson publicly contradicts himself on more than one occasion.

Only after being pressured by Gibbs-Smith after first making his claims in 1953 did James Watson admit that the aircraft Preston flew in 1903 was a glider. Prior to this admission, there was never any mention of a Watson built glider, neither by James, the eyewitnesses James presented in support of his original claim, nor significantly, by Preston Watson himself.

Exactly when Preston Watson carried out his first flights in this aircraft is the crux of the matter in the eyes of James Watson's supporters. For any claimant to powered flight earlier than the Wrights, the date of the Wright's first powered flight (17 December 1903) is when such flights must pre-date. It is therefore convenient for anyone recalling such an event some fifty years after it allegedly took place to quote the year as 1903 or earlier. It is also notable that none of the eye witnesses that James Watson interviewed whilst preparing his case for Watson's powered flights ever mentioned that they saw a glider flying at Errol; all of them saw a powered aeroplane. Only in Bell Milne was there a recollection of a Watson glider and even then, he never saw it being flown.

=== Debated claims ===
At the inquest into Preston's death on 30 June 1915, his father stated that his son, "...had taken a great interest in flying for the past seven years", suggesting that the year in which he was aware that Preston begun his fascination with flight was 1908, the year in which Wilbur Wright first flew in Europe and news of the Wright Brother's exploits became available to the public at large. Evidently however, he had demonstrated an interest in aviation before 1908, based on the fact that he had published a patent for flying machines a year earlier, but examining these draws the conclusion that his ideas at that time were way off the mark when it came to an understanding of what constituted a successful aircraft.

Although Watson applied for a patent for flying machines in late 1907 however, had an aircraft been built that incorporated his ideas, with all the will in the world it never would have left the ground. This is another fact that flies in the face of a Watson-built flying machine of any sort in 1903. Why would he produce such naïve work if his prior research into methods of achieving flight had been successful?

Another cause for debate is the claim that Preston Watson approached Brazilian aviator Alberto Santos-Dumont in 1906 and purchased from him a Dutheil Chalmers engine. In 1955, John Bell Milne made a personal assertion to Charles Gibbs-Smith that the year the motor was purchased was 1906. This could not have been possible, since Dutheil Chalmers & Cie did not construct their first aero-engine until 1907. In a later interview Bell Milne changed the date to a year later, thus bringing into question his earlier statements' validity.

Photographs show a Dutheil Chalmers motor fitted to Watson's first rocking wing aircraft, but Gibbs-Smith later presented these to M. Charles Dolfuss, Director of the Musee de L'Air at Le Bourget, Paris who confirmed it as a 1908 or 1909 four cylinder 40 hp Dutheil Chalmers motor. If Watson acquired the Dutheil Chalmers engine from Santos-Dumont, the earliest date the purchase could have taken place was 1908.

A further false statement made by James Watson was that Preston had the No. 3 shipped to France and entered into a competition, in which it won a safety award. No evidence of this can be found anywhere. The only competition in France Preston entered any of his aeroplanes in was the Concours de La Sécurité en Aéroplanes, in which his No.3 aeroplane was disqualified. Some sources quote the date in which Watson's No.3 won the safety prize was 1913, but the Concours held between 1 January and 1 July 1914 was the first of its kind.

=== Eyewitnesses ===
As with most claims of powered-flight-before-the-Wrights, the only supporting evidence James Watson produced was that of eyewitnesses. Like other claimants, the eyewitness accounts Watson supplied are inconsistent with one another and were made at least fifty years after the alleged events took place. In this respect the Watson case draws parallels with that of the New Zealand aviation pioneer Richard Pearse. In a letter dated 19 December 1959 to one G. Bolt after he had submitted information about Richard Pearse to Charles Gibbs-Smith, the latter advises Bolt to be wary of eyewitness claims. With regards to the Watson case, he states that after the story and photographs were published in 1953:

…the late J.Y. Watson admitted that his great edifice was false, and this after producing eyewitness to the actual event. The eyewitness who tells you what he saw fifty or more years after is, as often as not, completely unreliable; and this was driven home in the Watson case. People simply do not remember without prejudice.

In the 15 May 1914 issue of Flight magazine, Preston Watson himself stated that, in his own words, "these gentlemen, the Wrights, were the first to fly in a practical way", and at no time during his life did he ever contradict that statement. By contrast, James' and others' testimonies to the dubious claims of Preston's powered-flight-before-the-Wrights are riddled with inconsistencies, changes of facts and general errors. Bearing this in mind, it is difficult to refute Preston's own words on the matter.

Confirmation from articles in the Dundee Courier in 1910 confirming completion dates of Watson's first and second aeroplanes pour cold water on the suggestion that he built and flew rocking wing aircraft any earlier. Yet the rumours persist, with no small thanks to the likes of the book The Pioneer Flying Achievements of Preston Watson, which is full of inconsistencies and errors and relies primarily on James Watson's discredited testimony.

The unearthing of factual accounts of Watson's activities has not prevented a flood of articles and further re-assertions of the discredited stories in newspapers and magazines since James first made his assertions, however. During the 100th anniversary year of the Wrights' first powered flights, reporters took up the story and published "their" exclusive in the local press, recycling the same James Watson quotes and statements between them.

Facts about Preston Watson remain as obscure to the public today as before December 1953, and although James Watson later publicly denied the claims he made about his brother, there are still many who refuse to accept that his tale has been so comprehensively debunked.

== Family ==
He was married to Beatrice Philip (1882–1971). Their son Ronald Stuart Watson (1908–1941) was killed at sea whilst serving as a Lieutenant in the Royal Navy Volunteer Reserve.

== See also ==
- Aircraft flight control system
- Clive Franklyn Collett
- Charles Gibbs-Smith
- List of aviation pioneers
- Richard Pearse
- Alberto Santos Dumont
- Wing warping
- The Wright Brothers
