= The Cloverfield Paradox (soundtrack) =

The Cloverfield Paradox (Original Motion Picture Soundtrack)

Film score by Bear McCreary
- Released: February 4, 2018
- Recorded: 2017–2018
- Studios: Sony Scoring Stage, Sony Pictures, Culver City, California
- Genre: Film score
- Length: 76:17
- Labels: Sparks & Shadows; Paramount
- Producers: Bear McCreary; Joe Augustine; Steve Kaplan

Bear McCreary chronology
Happy Death Day (2017)	The Cloverfield Paradox (Original Motion Picture Soundtrack) (2018)	Tau (2018)

The Cloverfield Paradox (Original Motion Picture Soundtrack) is the film score soundtrack to the 2018 film The Cloverfield Paradox, directed by Julius Onah, which is the third film in the Cloverfield franchise, following Cloverfield (2008) and 10 Cloverfield Lane (2016). The film score is composed and conducted by Bear McCreary and released on February 4, 2018, under the Sparks & Shadows and Paramount Music label.

== Development ==
Bear McCreary, who previously composed 10 Cloverfield Lane returned to score music for Paradox. McCreary produced modern soundscape for the score which enhanced with the propulsion of synths and orchestra.

Like the predecessor, the film's score was thematically driven with the main theme and Ava's theme laying the foundation for the score. The former, which was titled as "Overture", was enhanced with the ostinato that provided tension and propulsion to several scenes that supported the main theme. He presented cues to Onah and producer J. J. Abrams and showcased scenes built from an entirely different theme "a long, legato melody set above an introspective harmonic progression – functional, perhaps, but not memorable." The last of the cues he showed them was written for the sequence where Ava Hamilton (Gugu Mbatha-Raw) discovers the earth missing which was built from the rapid chromatic licks, capturing the expressions of Hamilton and "Monk" Acosta (John Ortiz). Abrams responded to that the cue was written by someone with a sense of rumour, which led McCreary to scrap the original idea he had for composing the main theme and used the cue as the basis for the "Overture" track. The initial cue would still be used in the film and the album as "Drifting in the Dark".

Ava's theme was an emotional cue which was underscored to counterbalance the horror elements, written in 6/8 time signature as the main theme and built from a unique ostinato and melody. It was built with an harmonic rhythm that signifies the narrative structure and is the only theme to feature choir with the use of sopranos, altos and tenor vocals highlighting a multitude of emotions. A theme was specifically composed when the protagonists fire up the Shepard particle accelerator, which consists of a swirling tornado of strings accelerated as subatomic particles throughout the score being represented through points and waves, and the violins and violas were underscored to represent the mystery of the subatomic world. Inspired by Bernard Herrmann's fantasy scores, he used muted trumpets, trombones and stopped French horns to represent the fantasy element. He also composed the anomaly theme to represent the increasing anxiety of the threat level, where he composed a droning texture appear as recurring motif throughout the film and set in 5/8 time signature. "Airlock 6" and "Spacewalk" were unique themes built from unique motifs of the score.

== Release ==
The film score was released on February 4, 2018, the same day after the Netflix premiere; the album was distributed by McCreary's Sparks & Shadows and Paramount Music label.

== Reception ==
Filmtracks.com wrote: "McCreary once again provides music too good for its context, and his future in our universe has never looked more promising." Ben of Soundtrack Universe wrote: "The Cloverfield Paradox is another solid effort from Hollywood's busiest composer and an easy recommend to genre fans as well as more casual listeners." Alex Godfrey of Empire and Matt Zoller Seitz of RogerEbert.com opined that it sounded like Bernard Herrmann's and "Elliot Goldenthal's majestically bummed out score for Alien 3". Don Kaye of Den of Geek wrote: "Bear McCreary’s score, on the other hand, is overbearing and intrusive, working feverishly to create suspense and drama where there is none." Sam Ashurst of Digital Spy called it as "a stunning Hitchcockian score from Bear McCreary". Rob Hunter of Film School Rejects wrote: "the score by the normally reliable Bear McCreary is equally overdone".

== Track listing ==
The Cloverfield Paradox (Original Motion Picture Soundtrack) track listing
No.	Title	Length
1.	"Overture"	2:10
2.	"Ava and Michael"	2:25
3.	"Converging Overload"	2:17
4.	"Drifting in the Dark"	5:35
5.	"In the Wall"	2:30
6.	"Mutant Space Worms"	6:44
7.	"Jensen"	4:40
8.	"Molly"	3:01
9.	"Cassiopeia"	5:00
10.	"Airlock 6"	2:02
11.	"A Message for Ava"	5:44
12.	"Magno-Putty"	3:56
13.	"Spacewalk"	6:46
14.	"Launch Sequence"	8:46
15.	"A Stable Beam"	7:06
16.	"The Cloverfield Paradox"	7:35
Total length:		76:17

== Credits ==
Credits adapted from liner notes.

- Music – Bear McCreary
- Album producer – Bear McCreary, Joe Augustine
- Score producer – Bear McCreary, Steve Kaplan
- Recording and mixing – Steve Kaplan
- Recording assistance – Angelina Park, Marisa Gunzenhauser
- Mastering – Pat Sullivan
- Music editor – Michael Baber
- Scoring assistance – Allan Hessler, Andrew Ransom, David Matics, Jason Akers, Ryan Sanchez, Ryan Walsh, Sam Ewing, Zachary Lucia
- Album coordinator – Jason Richmond
- Scoring coordinator – Kaiyun Wong
- Scoring manager – Joanna Pane
- Executive producer – J. J. Abrams
- Design – John Hofstetter
- Liner notes – Bear McCreary
- Executive in charge of music for Paramount Pictures – Randy Spendlove

Orchestra

- Conductor – Bear McCreary
- Orchestrators – Edward Trybek, Henri Wilkinson, Jonathan Beard
- Assistant orchestrators – Benjamin Hoff, Jamie Thierman, Sean Barrett
- Orchestra contractor – Peter Rotter
- Vocal contractor – Jasper Randall
- Copyist – Andrew Harris

Instrumentalists

- Bassoon – Damian Montano, Rose Corrigan
- Clarinet – Ralph Williams, Stuart Clark
- Contrabass – Bart Samolis, Drew Dembowski, Edward Meares, Michael Valerio, Nico Carmine Abondolo, Stephen Dress, Thomas Harte
- Flute – Geraldine Rotella, Jenni Olson
- Harp – Jo Ann Turovsky
- Horn – Amy Jo Rhine, Benjamin Jaber, Daniel Kelley, Dave Everson, Dylan Hart, Jenny Kim, John E. Mason, Katelyn Farudo, Laura Brenes, Mark Adams, Steven Becknell, Teag Reaves
- Oboe, English horn – Chris Bleth
- Percussion – Brian Kilgore
- Piano – Randy Kerber
- Trombone – Alexander Iles, Will Reichenbach, Phillip Keen, Steve Holtman, William Booth
- Trumpet – Barry Perkins, Chris Still, David Washburn, Jon Lewis
- Tuba – Blake Cooper, Doug Tornquist, Gary Hickman
- Viola – Alma Fernandez, Brian Dembow, Caroline Buckman, Darrin McCann, David Walther, Erik Rynearson, John Zach Dellinger, Jonathan Moerschel, Keith Greene, Luke Maurier, Maria Newman, Matt Funes, Meredith Crawford, Robert A. Brophy, Scott Hosfeld, Shawn Mann, Tom Lea, Victoria De Almeida
- Violin – Alyssa Park, Amy Hershberger, Ana Landauer, Andrew Bulbrook, Benjamin Jacobson, Charlie Bisharat, Darius Campo, Eun-Mee Ahn, Grace Oh, Helen Nightengale, Irina Voloshina, Jay Rosen, Jessica Guideri, Josefina Vergara, Julie Gigante, Katia Popov, Kevin Connolly, Kevin Kumar, Leah Zeger, Lisa Liu, Lisa Sutton, Lorenz Gamma, Luanne Homzy, Lucia Micarelli, Maia Jasper, Marc Sazer, Maya Magub, Natalie Leggett, Neil Samples, Neli Nikolaeva, Phillip Levy, Rafael Rishik, Robert Anderson, Roberto Cani, Roger Wilkie, Sandra Cameron, Sarah Thornblade, Serena McKinney, Songa Lee, Tamara Hatwan
- Violoncello – Andrew Shulman, Armen Ksajikian, Christina Soule, Dane Little, Dennis Karmazyn, Eric Byers, Evgeny Tonkha, Jacob Braun, Jacob Szekely, Paula Hochhalter, Steve Erdody, Tim Loo, Vanessa Freebairn-Smith, Helen Altenbach
