= Cloverfield/Kishin =

Manga series

- Cover of the first volume.

クローバーフィールド/KISHIN (Kurōbāfīrudo/KISHIN)
- Manga
- Written by: David Baronoff; Matthew Pitts; Nicole Phillips
- Illustrated by: Yoshiki Togawa
- Published by: Kadokawa Shoten
- Magazine: Shōnen Ace (virtual)
- Original run: January 2008 – May 2008
- Volumes: 4 chapters

Cloverfield/Kishin (クローバーフィールド/KISHIN, Kurōbāfīrudo/KISHIN) is a manga and cross-media tie-in to the 2008 film Cloverfield. The Shōnen Ace magazine published the manga on Kadokawa Shoten's website. It was released once a month and consists of four chapters. The story details the lives of two students seeking shelter before what may seem to be the Chuai incident seen in the film's viral marketing material, and their internal conflicts when the Cloverfield monster makes an appearance. One of the students is being tracked by a cult that has connections to both the monster and the fictional Japanese drilling company Tagruato.

== Plot ==
The story introduces two teenagers, Kishin Aiba and Aiko Sasahara, struggling to learn more about an incident that takes place before the Chuai incident and the events of Cloverfield, as Tokyo comes under attack from a monster.

Inside Tagruato headquarters, Mr. Aiba warns about the events set to unfold. After hearing it on a news broadcast, Kishin and Aiko set off for shelter, bonding along the way. They arrive in Aiba's apartment, to acquire autographs from one of the pop stars that promotes the drink Slusho! at the behest of Aiko. Kishin, reluctant at first, sees medical records of himself. The two come into an encounter with a mysterious cult intending to use Kishin in a twisted ritual that ties him to the monster and some of Tagruato and Slusho!'s darker motives. Kishin and Aiko separate after a struggle with the cult. The cult wears masks that resemble the monster's face and carry charms with the monster's claws. Aiko encounters the military and tells them to help Kishin. They tell her that they'll do it if she leaves with the rest of the troops to a nearby shelter. Aiko goes to the shelter. However, they ignore her demand and Aiko vows to rescue Kishin.

Mr. Aiba arrives and kills the cult members. He tells Kishin that Mrs. Aiba sabotaged a Tagruato experiment involving the monster called Splinter of Amnion (known to the cult as God's vestige) and fused its DNA (in the form of a tiny ball) with Kishin's in order for the cult to use him as a vessel to control the monster, as the Splinter requires a host. She was killed by Tagruato as consequence. Kishin is the only person with the monster's DNA inside his body and is able to control it. Mr. Aiba tells Kishin that he has to die for the sake of humanity, and he is willing to die along with him. Mr. Aiba activates a switch that causes an explosion but the monster arrives and shields Kishin with its hand. Meanwhile, Aiko escapes the shelter and kills one of the monster's parasites. She witnesses Kishin stand in front of the monster. Kishin communicates with the monster and recalls his past. He realizes that his life has been nothing but misery and betrayal and succumbs to madness. Kishin decides to abandon his useless self and destroy the cruel world that tormented him. Kishin and the monster begin to mobilize.

Kishin and the monster cause havoc throughout the city before returning to the school. A group of parasites begin attacking three bullies, who are shocked that Kishin is not harmed by the parasites. He orders the parasites to assault and knock out two of the bullies. The third bully is saved by Aiko who talks some sense into Kishin, revealing that she has feelings for him. After saving her from falling rubble, they take shelter in a room. While there, Kishin cuts his hair, signifying his new resolve and says he will face the monster alone. He runs outside and comes to a stop in front of it. He tells the monster he has the Splinter of Amnion. The monster consumes Kishin with one of its underbelly feeding tubes. While using the orb, the monster flies into a rage after experiencing the pain Kishin felt throughout his life, until stopping at the one thing that he did care for: Aiko.

After a soldier shoots the monster in the eye, it roars one more time. Wounded and shaken by Kishin's revelation, it returns to the ocean and sinks, seeing a giant egg and allowing itself to be absorbed by it and rest in peace. The giant egg is part of a larger nest full of monsters. Later, Kishin is found floating on a piece of wood and is brought back into the ravaged city, where Aiko is happy to see him and they embrace each other.

== Background ==
The manga has a stronger focus on the viral-marketing materials such as Slusho! and Tagruato than the film. There are several new revelations regarding the nature and biology of the monster.

== See also ==
- List of comics based on films
