= Clover (creature) =

Cloverfield character

- Cloverfield character
- Clover as seen in the first film
- First appearance: Cloverfield (2008)
- Last appearance: The Cloverfield Paradox (2018)
- Created by: J. J. Abrams
- Designed by: Neville Page

In-universe information
- Alias: Cloverfield Monster
- Type: Unknown giant animal

Clover is the production name given to the giant monster who first appeared in the 2008 science fiction film Cloverfield. Also known as The Cloverfield Monster, the creature was originally conceived by producer J. J. Abrams and was designed by artist Neville Page. In the film, the monster's name is never mentioned; the name "Cloverfield" is only given to the US Department of Defense case file of the incidents depicted in the film. The Department of Defense names the creature "LSA" for Large-Scale Aggressor in the film's Blu-ray special feature called "Cloverfield Special Investigation Mode."

== Appearances ==
The monster was first referred to in the viral marketing campaign for Cloverfield, including a recording of its roar, foreign news clips about a monster attack, and sonar images. It then made its first full appearance in the film, where it was seen to be 25 stories tall and rampaging through New York City while being attacked by the United States military.

A similar monster appears in the four-part manga series Cloverfield/Kishin (2008) by Yoshiki Togawa, which serves as a spin-off from the film.

The monster does not appear in the second film of the Cloverfield franchise, the 2016 film 10 Cloverfield Lane.

Despite its size, the monster was conceived by the film's creators as being a newborn. In The Cloverfield Paradox (2018), a similar but significantly larger creature is seen at the conclusion of the film, possibly the same creature who has grown much larger with age. Earlier in the film, a massive shadow is seen by the character Michael Hamilton, but it is not made clear if the shadow is from the creature seen at the end of the film, from the original Clover, or from a different member of their species.

== Concept and creation ==
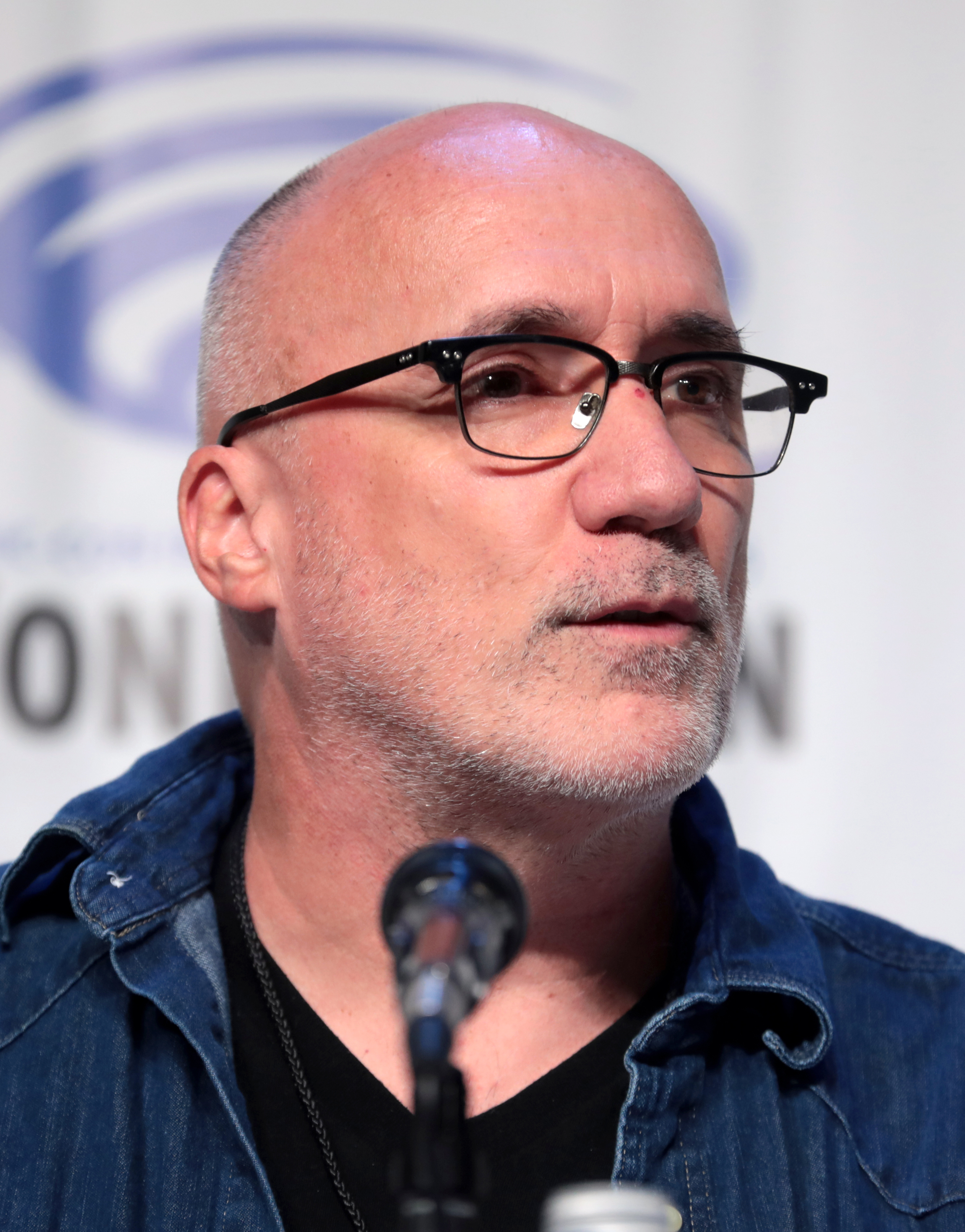
Neville Page (pictured in 2022) designed the creature

J. J. Abrams conceived of a new monster after he and his son visited a toy store in Japan while promoting Mission: Impossible III. He explained, "We saw all these Godzilla toys, and I thought, we need our own [American] monster, and not like King Kong, King Kong's adorable. But I wanted something that was just insane and intense."

The monster was designed by artist Neville Page. He sought a biological rationale for the creature, though many of his ideas would not show up on screen. Page designed the creature as immature and suffering from "separation anxiety." He compared the creature to a rampaging elephant, saying "there's nothing scarier than something huge that's spooked." Page said of the creature's backstory, "For me, one of the most key moments in our collective brainstorming was the choice to make the creature be something that we would empathize with. It is not out there just killing. It is confused, lost, scared. It's a newborn. Having this be a story point (one that the audience does not know), it allowed for some purposeful choices about its anatomy, movement and, yes, motivations." The creature was developed by visual effects supervisor Kevin Blank and Phil Tippett's company Tippett Studio. Blank described the intended goal of the creature, "Rather than the monster having a personality [like Godzilla or King Kong], it's more of an entity or an event."

Director Matt Reeves described the creature's reaction to its surroundings thus: "It's this new environment that it finds frightening." To indicate this, Reeves suggested the addition of white in the creature's eyes so it would look similar to a spooked horse. The filmmakers generated and used the idea of parasites because the film could not realistically have scenes between the human protagonists and the enormous creature.

=== Creature design ===
Although conceived by the film's creators as infantile, the creature is 25 stories tall (corresponding to 250+ feet or 76+ meters) and withstands missiles, artillery shells, and bombs with minimal injury.

It is vaguely quadrupedal, though capable of standing upright over short distances. The limbs are comparatively long and thin compared with the body core, and according to creator Neville Page, this, coupled with its quadrupedal stance, is meant to imply that it is a newborn: he speculates that the adults may be bipedal. The forelimbs are large in proportion to the body, and the hind legs stubby. The creature's head at first glance appears to be a solid sphere; but it can open its mouth extremely wide. Above the eyes on either side of the head are fleshy pouches which inflate when breathing.

The creature's design includes appendages on its underbelly, described by Neville Page as an "elongated, and articulated external esophagus with the business end terminating in teethlike fingers". They were designed to relate the scale of human prey to the huge scale of the creature. The scenes from the film where people were consumed by these appendages were cut from the final edit, but the fourth and final chapter of Cloverfield/Kishin shows this.

The creature is covered with parasites, which it sheds as part of a "post-birth ritual". Abrams described the parasites as "horrifying, dog-sized creatures that just scatter around the city and add to the nightmare of the evening." Reeves added that "The parasites have a voracious, rabid, bounding nature, but they also have a crab-like crawl. They have the viciousness of a dog, but with the ability to climb walls and stick to objects". The top half of the parasite's head is the mandible. The top and lower jaws end in serrated edges and have four pairs of eyes each. The rest of the parasite consists of a crustacean-like carapace, several pairs of claws, and arms. A deep blue-purple muscular membrane stretches between the top and lower jaws. When a human is bitten, the victim becomes ill and bleeds profusely, mainly from the eyes, and shortly after this, the torso expands and explodes. They are called HSPs (Human Scale Parasites) on the Blu-ray Special Investigation Mode.

Artist Neville Page, in response to claims that the design of the creature was similar to that of the 2006 South Korean film The Host, said, "They are [similar] in that they ravage and seem to originate from the water, but the end results are quite different. However, when I finally saw some of the concept art, there were some very obvious similarities. But then again, I think that we were both channeling similar biological possibilities."

== Origins ==
The viral marketing campaign for "Cloverfield" suggested that the creature was an ancient amphibious organism awakened by the drilling of Chuai Station, an oil platform of the Japanese company Tagruato which had the purpose of extracting a substance called Sea Bed Nectar that would become the secret ingredient of a drink called Slusho.

In an interview, Cloverfield director Matt Reeves confirmed the monster is an alien and that the meteor briefly seen falling into the ocean at the end of the movie is “the beginning of the baby being on Earth.”

== Merchandise ==
Cloverfield limited edition toy figure by Hasbro.

Based on the success of Cloverfield, which earned over $40 million during its opening weekend in January 2008, the toy company Hasbro began accepting orders for a 14 inches (36 cm) limited edition toy figure of the monster to be shipped to fans starting December 24, 2008. It comes with several accessories, including the disembodied head of the Statue of Liberty, two changeable heads (one with an open mouth, one with a closed mouth), and 10 static figures of the monster's parasites.

== Critical analysis ==
Reviewing the film Cloverfield, the San Jose Mercury News described the creature as "a monster for the MySpace generation". Reviewer James Berardinelli noted, "The movie follows the Jaws rule that monsters are usually more intimidating when they are shown infrequently and only in brief glimpses." Amy Biancolli of the Houston Chronicle described the creature as retaining "an air of mystery—a monstrous je ne sais quoi that makes him all the freakier". Richard Corliss of Time complained of the recycled elements of the creature, such as its emergence mimicking the original Godzilla film and its parasites being similar to the "toy meanies" from the 1984 film Gremlins.

Roger Ebert of the Chicago Sun-Times expressed acceptance of the lack of explanation for the creature's origin, explaining that it "is all right with me after the tiresome opening speeches in so many of the 30 or more Godzilla films". Peter Howell of the Toronto Star thought that the "main" creature was disappointing, while he considered the "mutant spider crabs" that came from it as "way scarier". Lawrence Person of Locus Online describes it as "like a cross between a truly giant mantis and Johnny the Skeletal Torso". Todd McCarthy of Variety found that the creature was more reassuring as it appeared more in the film, explaining, "Its very nature as a walking, stalking being suggests it can somehow be killed by conventional means." Chris Vognar of The Dallas Morning News applauded the creature's appearance as cinematic:

The thrill here isn't in the critter but in how it's revealed. First we see what it's capable of. Then we catch a tail here, a limb there. The spider-crabs announce their presence with authority. Then, once the opening acts are done, and Manhattan is in shambles, the big guy is ready for his close-up.

== See also ==
- Kaiju
