= Bad Robot =

American film and television production company

- Logo used since 2008
- Type: Private
- Industry: Film; Television; Music
- Founded: May 27, 1999; 27 years ago
- Founder: J. J. Abrams
- Headquarters: New York, United States
- Key people: J. J. Abrams (CEO)
- Products: Alias; Lost; Fringe; Person of Interest; Cloverfield
- Divisions: Bad Robot Television; Bad Robot Games; Loud Robot
- Website: www.badrobot.com

Bad Robot Productions is an American film and television production company founded on May 27, 1999, and led by J. J. Abrams as CEO. The company is responsible for the television series Alias, Lost, Fringe, Person of Interest, Revolution, and Westworld alongside producing notable film franchises, including Cloverfield, the Star Trek reboot trilogy, Mission: Impossible, and the Star Wars sequel trilogy.

== History ==
The original Bad Robot Productions logo used from 2001 through 2008

Bad Robot was originally based at Touchstone Television, but was moved by J. J. Abrams to Paramount Pictures and Warner Bros. Television, after his contract with ABC expired in 2006. Bad Robot produced Lost in association with ABC Studios, formerly Touchstone Television. The two companies jointly produced Six Degrees and What About Brian. The deal was first recommended and presented in 1999 as part of a presentation deal, with J.J. Abrams being contracted to Disney. In 2004, Thom Sherman joined Bad Robot Television as president of the studio. The company had developed presentation pitches for ABC and The WB, with none of them going to series.

Abrams is CEO of Bad Robot. In May 2015, Ben Stephenson left the BBC where he had been head of drama to lead Bad Robot Television. Lindsey Weber once led Bad Robot's feature film division.

The production logo has appeared since 2001, featuring a red rectangular headed robot running through a meadow silhouetted until it appears suddenly in front of the camera, followed by voices provided by two of Abrams's children, Henry and Gracie, saying "Bad robot!"

In February 2013, it was announced that Bad Robot would be partnering with the Valve Corporation to produce possibly a Half-Life or Portal film in the distant future. In August 2015, Valve released a new beta game mode to Team Fortress 2, PASS Time, which Bad Robot worked on. On July 7, 2016, the PASS Time game mode became official. In August 2013, Bad Robot released a trailer on YouTube entitled "Stranger", rumoured to be Abrams' next film or television project, perhaps even a Lost spin-off, but it was finally explained to be promoting S., Abrams and Doug Dorst's new novel, as a new trailer for S. was released in the following month. In February 2017, it was announced Julius Avery is attached to direct a Paramount coproduction, the World War II zombie film Overlord, from screenwriter Billy Ray.

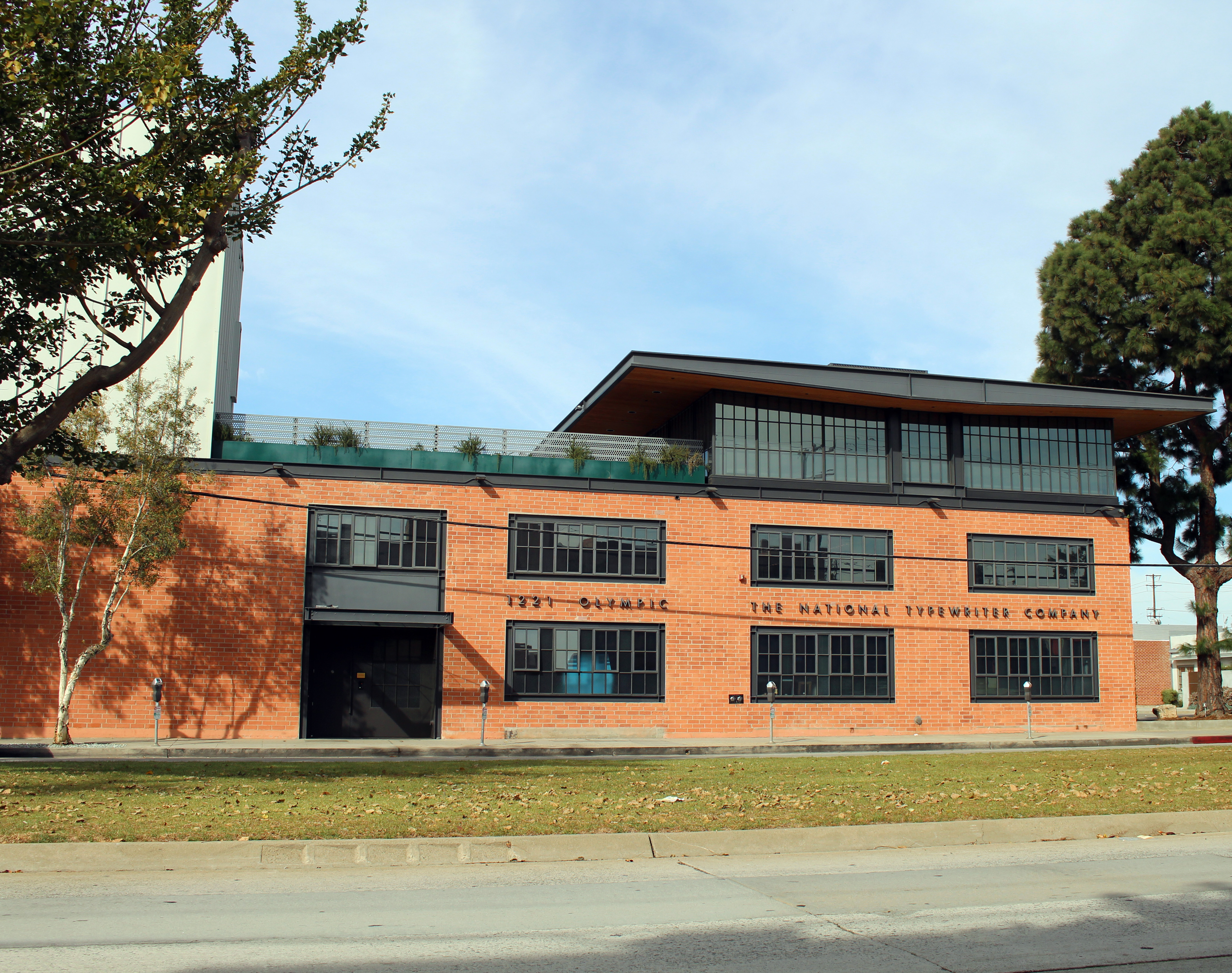
The "National Typewriter Company", Bad Robot's former Santa Monica headquarters

Bad Robot held a base in Santa Monica, California, in a building which is incorrectly labeled on purpose as the home of the fictional "National Typewriter Company" because Abrams "likes typewriters — and misdirection."

In June 2018, the company announced a spin-off venture formed with the Chinese video game publisher Tencent to launch Bad Robot Games for the development of video games on mobile, computer and consoles, with Warner Bros. Interactive Entertainment as a minority investor. Bad Robot Games will develop and publish new and existing IPs including titles related to Abrams' works and other Bad Robot Production content, with Tencent holding the rights for distribution in China.

The division was originally led by Dave Baronoff, who previously worked on the Cloverfield franchise and was developing Spyjinx as a joint project between Bad Robot Productions and Epic Games (also partially owned by Tencent), while Tim Keenan, who helped develop Duskers, served as the creative director.

In 2020, Anna Sweet was brought on as the CEO of Bad Robot Games. Mike Booth also joined in December 2020, managing the company's newly created in-house development studio. By February 2022, he had taken on the role of chief creative officer.

In 2006, Bad Robot teamed up with Paramount Pictures and Warner Bros. Television for a $60 million development deal that lasted through 2018.

In late 2018, it was announced that Bad Robot was leaving Paramount and seeking a new overall deal. In January 2019, it was announced that Universal, Disney, and Warner Bros. were the top three studios battling it out for what could be a record breaking overall deal including theme parks, music labels, TV, merchandising, and streaming services as Bad Robot plans on ramping up production significantly in the coming years. It was also announced that Bad Robot would be co-producing a remake of the British series The Wrong Mans for American network Showtime along with BBC Studios, but Showtime later cancelled the project.

Bad Robot launched a subsidiary record label called Loud Robot in late 2018, in partnership with Capitol Music Group. Loud Robot is headed by co-general managers McKee Floyd and Nicky Berger along with Charles Scott, who currently heads Bad Robot's music division and has been the leading music supervisor for the company's films. Artists signed to the label include Cleveland-born rapper Nnena, neo soul singer/songwriter UMI, Nashville, Tennessee-based alternative rock artist Chaz Cardigan, and London-based rhythm and blues artist DWY.

On September 12, 2019, Bad Robot officially announced a new five-year overall deal with WarnerMedia. According to The Hollywood Reporter, WarnerMedia agreed to pay Bad Robot at least $250 million (plus various financial incentives) to produce feature films, television shows, video games, and digital content.

On May 25, 2021, Abrams announced that a Portal film adaptation, which has been in development since 2013, was still in production and a script has been written for the film. In November 2021, the company launched its podcast division with a multi-year first-look deal at Spotify.

On April 25, 2022, it was announced that Bad Robot will team up with Mattel Films and Warner Bros. Pictures to produce a live-action Hot Wheels film based on the toy line of the same name. Most recently, in December 2024, the company had extended its deal with Warner Bros. Pictures.

In November 2025, it was reported that Abrams sold the Santa Monica property housing the Bad Robot headquarters for US$31 million to Black Bear Pictures. He began scaling back the production house's operations in April 2026, closing its office in Los Angeles and moving it to New York.

== Filmography ==
=== Films ===
Year	Title	Director	Co-production with	Budget	Gross
2001	Joy Ride	John Dahl	20th Century Fox; Regency Enterprises; LivePlanet	$23 million	$36.6 million
2008	Cloverfield	Matt Reeves	Paramount Pictures	$25 million	$170.8 million
2009	Star Trek	J. J. Abrams	Paramount Pictures; Spyglass Entertainment	$150 million	$385.7 million
2010	Morning Glory	Roger Michell	Paramount Pictures	$40 million	$60 million
2011	Super 8	J. J. Abrams	Paramount Pictures; Amblin Entertainment	$50 million	$260.1 million
2011	Mission: Impossible – Ghost Protocol	Brad Bird	Paramount Pictures; TC Productions; Skydance Productions	$145 million	$694.7 million
2013	Star Trek Into Darkness	J. J. Abrams	Paramount Pictures; Skydance Productions; K/O Paper Products	$190 million	$467.4 million
2014	Infinitely Polar Bear	Maya Forbes	Sony Pictures Classics	$6.7 million	$2.1 million
2015	Mission: Impossible – Rogue Nation	Christopher McQuarrie	Paramount Pictures; Skydance Productions; China Movie Channel; Alibaba Pictures	$150 million	$682.7 million
2015	Star Wars: The Force Awakens	J. J. Abrams	Lucasfilm Ltd. Walt Disney Studios Motion Pictures	$447 million	$2.068 billion
2016	10 Cloverfield Lane	Dan Trachtenberg	Paramount Pictures	$15 million	$110.2 million
2016	Star Trek Beyond	Justin Lin	Paramount Pictures; Skydance Media; Alibaba Pictures; Huahua Media; Sneaky Shark Productions; Perfect Storm Entertainment	$185 million	$343.5 million
2018	The Cloverfield Paradox	Julius Onah	Netflix; Paramount Pictures	$45 million	N/A
2018	Mission: Impossible – Fallout	Christopher McQuarrie	Paramount Pictures; TC Productions; Skydance Media; Alibaba Pictures	$178 million	$791 million
2018	Overlord	Julius Avery	Paramount Pictures	$38 million	$41.7 million
2019	Star Wars: The Rise of Skywalker	J. J. Abrams	Lucasfilm Ltd. Walt Disney Studios Motion Pictures	$416 million	$1.074 billion
2022	Lou	Anna Foerster	Netflix	$36 million	N/A
2024	The Blue Angels	Paul Crowder	Amazon MGM Studios; Zipper Bros. Films; Sutter Road Picture Company; Diamond Docs; Barnstorm Productions; IMAX Entertainment; Dolphin Films	N/A	$2.6 million
2024	Elizabeth Taylor: The Lost Tapes	Nanette Burstein	HBO Documentary Films; Zipper Bros; Gerber Pictures; Sutter Road Picture Company; House of Taylor	N/A	N/A
2026	The End of Oak Street	David Robert Mitchell	Warner Bros. Pictures; Jackson Pictures	$80-90 million	$122 million

=== Upcoming films ===
Year	Title	Director	Co-production with
2027	Skeletons	JT Mollner	Sony Pictures Releasing; Columbia Pictures; Infrared Pictures; Assemble Media
2027	The Great Beyond	J. J. Abrams	Warner Bros. Pictures
2028	Oh, the Places You'll Go!	Jon M. Chu; Jill Culton	Warner Bros. Pictures; Warner Bros. Pictures Animation; Dr. Seuss Enterprises
TBA	Emily the Strange	TBA	Warner Bros. Pictures Animation; Dark Horse Entertainment
TBA	Supercolossal	TBA	Warner Bros. Pictures Animation

=== TV series ===
Year	Title	Creator(s) / Developer(s)	Co-production with	Notes	Network
2001–2006	Alias	J. J. Abrams	Touchstone Television		ABC
2004–2010	Lost	Jeffrey Lieber; J. J. Abrams; Damon Lindelof	Touchstone Television		ABC
2006–2007	What About Brian	Dana Stevens	Sachs/Judah Productions (season 1); Touchstone Television		ABC
2006–2007	Six Degrees	Raven Metzner; Stuart Zicherman	Nosebleed Productions; Touchstone Television		ABC
2008–2013	Fringe	J. J. Abrams; Alex Kurtzman; Roberto Orci	Warner Bros. Television		Fox
2009	Anatomy of Hope			Pilot	HBO
2010	Undercovers	J. J. Abrams; Josh Reims	Warner Bros. Television; Good Butter Productions		NBC
2011–2016	Person of Interest	Jonathan Nolan	Kilter Films; Warner Bros. Television		CBS
2012	Alcatraz	Elizabeth Sarnoff; Steven Lilien; Bryan Wynbrandt	Warner Bros. Television		Fox
2012	Shelter		Warner Bros. Television	Pilot	The CW
2012–2014	Revolution	Eric Kripke; Jon Favreau	Kripke Enterprises; Warner Bros. Television		NBC
2013–2014	Almost Human	J. H. Wyman	Frequency Films; Warner Bros. Television		Fox
2014	Believe	Alfonso Cuarón; Mark Friedman	Esperanto Filmoj; Warner Bros. Television		NBC
2015	Dead People			Pilot	The CW
2016	11.22.63	Bridget Carpenter	Carpenter B. Warner Bros. Television		Hulu
2016	Moon Shot			Web series	—N/a
2016	Roadies	Cameron Crowe	Vinyl Films; Warner Bros. Television; Showtime Networks		Showtime
2016–2022	Westworld	Jonathan Nolan; Lisa Joy	HBO Entertainment; Kilter Films; Jerry Weintraub Productions (season 1); Warner Bros. Television		HBO
2018–2019	Castle Rock	Sam Shaw	Old Curiosity Shop; Darkbloom Productions; Warner Bros. Television		Hulu
2020	Little Voice	Jessie Nelson	Dear Hope Productions; Warner Bros. Television Studios		Apple TV+
2020	Lovecraft Country	Misha Green	Afemme; Monkeypaw Productions; Warner Bros. Television Studios		HBO
2020	Challenger: The Final Flight	Glen Zipper; Steven Leckart	Zipper Bros Films; Sutter Road Picture Company	Docuseries	Netflix
2021	Lisey's Story	Stephen King	40/60 Productions; Warner Bros. Television Studios		Apple TV+
2021	UFO	Glen Zipper	Zipper Bros Films; Sutter Road Picture Company	Docuseries	Showtime
2024–present	Presumed Innocent	David E. Kelley	David E. Kelley Productions; Old Curiosity Shop Productions; Nine Stories Productions; Warner Bros. Television Studios		Apple TV+
2024	Charlie Hustle & the Matter of Pete Rose	Mark Monroe	Live Star Entertainment; HBO Entertainment	Docuseries	HBO
2024–present	Batman: Caped Crusader	Bruce Timm	6th & Idaho Motion Picture Company; DC Entertainment; Warner Bros. Animation; Amazon MGM Studios		Amazon Prime Video
2024	Beyond: UFOs and the Unknown		Sutter Road Pictures; Zipper Bros Films	Docuseries	MGM+
2025	Duster	J. J. Abrams; LaToya Morgan	TinkerToy Productions; Warner Bros. Television Studios		Max

=== Shorts ===
Year	Title	Co-production with
2022	The Boy, the Mole, the Fox and the Horse	Apple Studios; BBC; NoneMore Productions

=== Video games ===
Year	Title	Platform
2011	Action Movie FX	iOS
2022	Weird West	PlayStation 4/5, Xbox One, Xbox Series X/S, PC
2022	Moonbreaker	PC
2023	Silent Hill: Ascension	Web browser, Android, iOS
TBA	4:Loop	PlayStation 5, PC

== Awards and recognition ==
Nominations

- 2002 Emmy Award Nomination, Outstanding Writing for A Drama Series (Alias)
- 2005 Emmy Award Nomination, Outstanding Writing for A Drama Series (Lost)
- 2007 Golden Globe Award Nomination, Best Television Series – Drama (Lost)

Wins

- 2005 Emmy Award Winner, Outstanding Drama Series (Lost)
- 2005 Emmy Award Winner, Outstanding Directing for A Drama Series (Lost)
- 2006 Golden Globe Award Winner, Best Television Series – Drama (Lost)
