= The Cloverfield Paradox =

2018 film by Julius Onah

- Promotional release poster
- Directed by: Julius Onah
- Screenplay by: Oren Uziel
- Story by: Oren Uziel; Doug Jung
- Produced by: J. J. Abrams; Lindsey Weber
- Starring: Gugu Mbatha-Raw; Elizabeth Debicki; Aksel Hennie; Daniel Brühl; Chris O'Dowd; John Ortiz; David Oyelowo; Zhang Ziyi
- Cinematography: Dan Mindel
- Edited by: Alan Baumgarten; Matt Evans; Rebecca Valente
- Music by: Bear McCreary
- Production companies: Paramount Pictures; Bad Robot
- Distributed by: Netflix
- Release date: February 4, 2018
- Running time: 102 minutes
- Country: United States
- Language: English
- Budget: $45 million

The Cloverfield Paradox is a 2018 American science fiction horror film directed by Julius Onah and written by Oren Uziel, from a story by Uziel and Doug Jung, and produced by J. J. Abrams and Lindsey Weber. It is the third film in the Cloverfield franchise, following Cloverfield (2008) and 10 Cloverfield Lane (2016). It stars Daniel Brühl, Elizabeth Debicki, Aksel Hennie, Gugu Mbatha-Raw, Chris O'Dowd, John Ortiz, David Oyelowo, and Zhang Ziyi. It follows an international group of astronauts aboard a space station who, after using a particle accelerator to try to solve Earth's energy crisis, must find a way home when the planet seemingly vanishes.

The film is based on God Particle, a spec script from Oren Uziel, which had the main plot of the space-station crew but was unconnected to Cloverfield. The script was acquired by Paramount Pictures and Bad Robot in 2012. It was planned as part of Paramount's low-budget Insurge Pictures distribution label but, following the folding of that label, its production was expanded as a Paramount-distributed film. Only during production did Abrams decide to link the film to Cloverfield and turn it into a standalone sequel, adapting Uziel's screenplay and adding scenes to establish the connection, after the same approach was used to alter 10 Cloverfield Lane from its original script, The Cellar. Abrams saw the particle accelerator accident as a cinematic means for future events to cause changes in the past, narratively linking the Cloverfield franchise together as separate timelines within the overall multiverse.

Once announced as a yet-to-be-named Cloverfield film in late 2016, the film's release was delayed several times. A surprise trailer aired during Super Bowl LII on February 4, 2018, advertising the film's final title and its release on Netflix, which had purchased rights for the film from Paramount. The release occurred immediately after the game. While the unique marketing tactics were praised, the film itself received generally negative reviews, with many considering it the weakest of the Cloverfield films.

== Plot ==
In 2028, Earth is suffering from a global energy crisis. As a result, worldwide agencies prepare to test the Shepard particle accelerator aboard the Cloverfield space station, which would provide Earth with infinite energy. The crew consists of British engineer Ava Hamilton, German physicist Ernst Schmidt, Brazilian medical doctor Monk Acosta, American commander Kiel, Russian engineer Volkov, Irish engineer Mundy, and Chinese engineer Tam.

Conspiracy theorists fear that the accelerator will create the "Cloverfield Paradox", which may open portals to parallel universes, allowing whatever is there to threaten Earth. After two years of unsuccessful attempts to activate the Shepard, the crew achieves a seemingly stable beam. When it overloads and creates a power surge, they find that Earth has vanished, and the gyroscope that aids in the station's navigation is missing.

As the crew works on repairs, they discover and rescue a woman called Mina Jensen, who was fused with wires inside a wall. Volkov's eyeballs begin moving of their own accord and he starts talking with his own reflection; Volkov also uses a gun to threaten the crew, but suddenly convulses and dies as the station's worm colony bursts out of him. Jensen tells Hamilton to not trust Schmidt, who she claims to be a spy sent by the German government to keep the Shepard shut down.

Meanwhile, on Earth, Hamilton's husband Michael, whose relationship struggles since their children's death in a fire, witnesses the silhoutte of a giant monster as it ravages the city. He helps a young girl, Molly, and takes her to an underground shelter to tend to her wounds.

On the station, Mundy's arm is pulled into a wall and severed. The crew finds the arm roaming of its own volition and recognize that it is trying to write something. The arm instructs them to "cut Volkov open". They do, and they find the missing gyroscope inside his corpse. The crew finally locate Earth and restore their communications, but the transmissions they receive indicate that the station was destroyed and fell to Earth two days prior. They determine that the accelerator has activated the "Cloverfield Paradox" and also transported the station to a parallel universe where Jensen has replaced Tam as the station's engineer.

The crew believe that they can return to their own universe if they reactivate the Shepard. Tam gets trapped in a chamber that floods with water and then breaches, freezing her to death. Hamilton decides to return to the parallel universe with Jensen in order to prevent her children's death. As they prepare, a magnetic field destabilizes the Shepard and causes an explosion that kills Mundy. When the whole station begins to tear apart, Kiel sacrifices himself to reactivate the Shepard, leaving Hamilton in charge.

Hamilton prepares to leave with Jensen, but she knocks her out and wounds Schmidt with Volkov's gun. Jensen also kills Acosta and insists that the station must stay in her universe to keep the accelerator there. Hamilton regains consciousness and uses the gun to shoot out a window that ejects Jensen into space. Hamilton records a message to her alternate self as she and Schmidt reverse the shift to finally make the Shepard work. After reporting in, both eject themselves in a reentry capsule towards their universe's Earth.

In light of the ongoing situation, Michael learns of the Cloverfield station's reappearance, but he lambasts Hamilton's return to Earth. As the capsule re-enters the atmosphere, a giant monster bursts through the clouds and lets out a roar.

== Cast ==
- Gugu Mbatha-Raw as Ava Hamilton, the British communications officer aboard Cloverfield station and Michael's wife
- David Oyelowo as Kiel, the American commander of the station
- Daniel Brühl as Ernst Schmidt, a German physicist
- John Ortiz as Monk Acosta, a Brazilian medical doctor
- Chris O'Dowd as Mundy, an Irish engineer
- Aksel Hennie as Volkov, a Russian engineer
- Zhang Ziyi as Tam, a Chinese engineer
- Elizabeth Debicki as Mina Jensen, an Australian engineer from one of the alternate timelines
- Roger Davies as Michael Hamilton, Ava's husband
- Clover Nee as Molly Pontanius, a young girl rescued by Michael

Additionally, Donal Logue cameos as Mark Stambler, a conspiracy theorist discussing the "Cloverfield Paradox", and possible relative of Howard Stambler who was the conspiracy theorist portrayed by John Goodman in 10 Cloverfield Lane. Suzanne Cryer, who appeared as Leslie in 10 Cloverfield Lane, also appears in a brief cameo role as a newscaster who interviews Stambler. Simon Pegg and Greg Grunberg, both of whom have frequently worked with Abrams on other films and television series, provide vocal cameos as Radio Voice and Joe, respectively. Oyelowo and Logue previously portrayed Kiel and Stambler in the film's ARG campaign.

== Production ==
=== Pre-production ===
The film was announced in November 2012, under the title God Particle, based on a script by Oren Uziel and to be directed by Julius Onah. With J.J. Abrams' Bad Robot as the production studio, it was set to be released under Paramount's Insurge Pictures label, limiting the film's budget to $5–10 million. At this stage, the film was established to take place on a space station in Earth's orbit and a resulting incident that causes the crew to find Earth has gone missing. Uziel said that his script had been a spec script he wrote about one year after finishing up a similar spec script for Shimmer Lake (2017).

The pick-up of the film occurred around the same time that Paramount and Bad Robot bought the rights to the spec script The Cellar by Josh Campbell and Matt Stuecken, which ultimately was reworked during production to become 10 Cloverfield Lane (2016), adding in elements to tie that script to Cloverfield (2008); however, when Uziel wrote his screenplay for God Particle it had not been attached to the Cloverfield franchise. When Bad Robot acquired the script, Abrams had already put some thought for how it could fit into Cloverfield but had not come up with a way prior to filming.

Abrams liked that with the script, "how something in the future could be an origin for something in the past" to establish origin stories for the other Cloverfield works. Abrams said that the script had "the DNA" that made it a potential Cloverfield film, and was looking for it to be a spiritual sequel to the original.

In March 2015, Paramount decided to close the InSurge label; The Cellar had been moved under the main Paramount label, but God Particle's fate was unclear. By February 2016, Paramount confirmed it would release the film under its own label, with a planned February 2017 release date.

=== Casting ===
In March 2016, Gugu Mbatha-Raw and David Oyelowo were confirmed to be cast in the film. In April, Variety reported that John Krasinski was in early talks to join the film to play one of the astronauts, but had a possible conflict due to a commitment with a television series. In May, Elizabeth Debicki, Daniel Brühl, Chris O'Dowd, Zhang Ziyi, John Ortiz, and Aksel Hennie were announced as members of the cast.

=== Filming ===
The film was shot in Los Angeles, California, where it received tax credits under the state's film incentive program. While filming in Los Angeles, the project was shot under the titles of God Particle and Clean Pass. Filming began on June 10, 2016, and wrapped on September 23, 2016. Dan Mindel was the cinematographer on the film. According to Uziel, it was during production that he came to learn that the film was being connected to Cloverfield, requiring him to rewrite a few scenes for additional shooting. Uziel speculated that the decision to connect to Cloverfield was due to the difficulty in marketing a stand-alone science-fiction film at the time, and felt the connection between the films was more of an anthology series similar to The Twilight Zone, with each movie dealing with how people with complex relations deal with an other-worldly dilemma.

The scenes set on Earth were added during production only after they found test audiences wanted to know what was happening on Earth during events on the space station. The final shot of the monster, similar to the creature Clover seen in the first Cloverfield movie, was a shot that the production team came to recognize as a further way to link the films. Among some of the film's Easter eggs includes a figurine of a "Slusho!" mascot aboard the station; the drink brand had been featured in Cloverfield's viral marketing.

=== Post-production ===
The visual effects were provided by Atomic Fiction and supervised by Ryan Tudhope, Russell Earl, Jason Snell, Stefano Trivelli and Pauline Duvall with the help of Industrial Light & Magic and Base FX.

== Release ==
Shortly after filming in October 2016, The Wrap learned from insiders of the connection of God Particle to Cloverfield, though neither Paramount nor Bad Robot commented on this discovery. However, by December 2016, Paramount affirmed the film's connection; the title God Particle had been dropped in favor of listing the film as "2017 Cloverfield movie".

Alongside the renaming, Paramount reslotted the film's release from February 2017 to October 2017, to give more time for post-production. The film suffered two additional delays. In July 2017, it was announced the release had been delayed another three months to February 2018. In January 2018, the release was moved for a third time, to April 20, 2018. The reason for these latter delays was not given.

In mid-January 2018, the Cloverfield alternative reality game (ARG), which had been used for both of the previous films, was relaunched, and provided some hints how this film would be tied to the other two.

In late January 2018, The Hollywood Reporter stated that Netflix was interested in picking up the film from Paramount, following a similar deal the streaming service had worked out for the film Annihilation. According to the Reporter, Paramount's chairman Jim Gianopulos felt the film's budget (which had ballooned to over $40 million from an initial $5 million) was too large for the film to be profitable with a traditional theatrical release and that it still needed work done, and "while Abrams expressed an intent to get down to business in post-production, it was too little, too late".

In March 2018, Paramount's COO Andrew Gumpert affirmed that Paramount, after reviewing the finished film with Abrams, had doubted the commercial viability of a theatrical release, and that "there was an ability for us to be fiscally prudent and monetize" by selling the rights to Netflix, exposing the film to a much larger audience. Following the film's release, The Hollywood Reporter stated that Netflix paid more than $50 million for the rights, with negotiations starting in late December 2017 and completed by mid January 2018; this offer made the film immediately profitable to Paramount. The studio retains China and home entertainment release rights.

According insiders speaking to The Wrap, Paramount executives believed handing off the release to Netflix was an easy way to get instant return on the film, and the surprise reveal and release is a good way to keep in line with the mystique of the franchise. This said, they clarified that they still have intentions of having theatrical releases for future films in the series.

Around this time, speculation of the film being named Cloverfield Station arose, though this was not confirmed by Paramount. Further speculation circulated in Hollywood sources that work on the film was actually complete and that its first trailer would be revealed soon; 10 Cloverfield Lane had a similar surprise trailer.

The events of the preceding month culminated on February 4, 2018, where, during a surprise advertisement during Super Bowl LII, Netflix announced it had acquired the premiere rights for the film, now titled The Cloverfield Paradox, which would be available on the service immediately after the game. The actors themselves were not aware of this arrangement until the day of the Super Bowl and were told of the title, the advertisement, and the release that day during a morning conference call.

=== Home media ===
On November 28, 2018, Paramount announced that the film would be receiving a DVD and Blu-ray release on February 5, 2019.

== Reception ==
=== Critical response ===
On the review aggregator website Rotten Tomatoes, 22% of 158 critics' reviews are positive, with an average rating of 4.5/10. The website's consensus reads: "Brilliant casting is overshadowed by a muddled mix of genres and storylines that scratch more heads than sci-fi itches in The Cloverfield Paradox." Metacritic, which uses a weighted average, assigned the film a score of 37 out of 100, based on 27 critics, indicating "generally unfavorable" reviews.

John DeFire of The Hollywood Reporter called the film a "trainwreck of a sci-fi flick bent on extending a franchise that should have died a peaceful death almost exactly one decade ago." Writing for Deadline Hollywood, Dino-Ray Ramos said, "The Super Bowl trailer for Paradox gave the impression the movie would reveal the origin of the monster that appeared in the 2008 movie and was later on hinted at in the critically acclaimed 2016 follow-up — but it barely did that. Instead, it stalls the franchise as a pastiche of sci-fi cinema veiled in clever marketing."

Cinemablend gave it a positive review, granting it 4 of 5 stars; the review noted that the ensemble cast "helps keep the wheels in motion, with a perpetual motion that never lets up", and that Ava's storyline provides a "human anchor" for the film's narrative.

=== Audience viewership ===
While the film received negative reviews, the marketing approach of announcing the film during the Super Bowl and premiering it hours later was seen as a novel move by Netflix. IGN noted that this strategy could only work for a film in an established franchise, whereas most new films would need a significant marketing period to draw in viewers. Even knowing that the film might be a critical flop, Netflix would have been able to grab attention due to hype from the Super Bowl, and attention that the Cloverfield series had already had.

According to Nielsen ratings based on subscription video on demand, nearly 785,000 viewers watched The Cloverfield Paradox on the night of Super Bowl LII; within three days, over 2.8 million had watched it, and 5 million after a week. These ratings were not as strong as Netflix's Bright, released 6 weeks earlier, which had 11 million viewers within 3 days. The film did not significantly draw viewers from the episode of This is Us on NBC after the Super Bowl game, which had been extensively marketed ahead of the night, and which drew 27 million that evening.

== Future ==
In February 2018, Abrams acknowledged potential for character crossovers in future films. The producer confirmed plans for an eventual team-up with Ava and Mary Elizabeth Winstead's Michelle from 10 Cloverfield Lane. In June 2018, Abrams revealed a fourth film that would serve as a "true" and "dedicated" sequel to Cloverfield.

In January 2021, Joe Barton was hired as screenwriter, while Abrams will co-produce the film with Hannah Minghella. The project will be a joint-venture production between Bad Robot and Paramount Pictures and will receive a theatrical release. In January 2023, Matt Reeves stated that the ongoing developments won't be talked about prior to future project releases, with intent for it to "always [be] surprising" similar to the previous installments.

== See also ==
- List of films featuring space stations
- Cloverfield (film)
