= Cloverfield =

2008 film by Matt Reeves

- Theatrical release poster
- Directed by: Matt Reeves
- Written by: Drew Goddard
- Produced by: Bryan Burk; J. J. Abrams
- Starring: Lizzy Caplan; Jessica Lucas; T.J. Miller; Michael Stahl-David; Mike Vogel; Odette Yustman
- Cinematography: Michael Bonvillain
- Edited by: Kevin Stitt
- Production company: Bad Robot
- Distributed by: Paramount Pictures
- Release date: January 18, 2008
- Running time: 85 minutes
- Country: United States
- Language: English
- Budget: $25–30 million
- Box office: $172.4 million

Cloverfield is a 2008 American found footage monster film directed by Matt Reeves and written by Drew Goddard. It stars Lizzy Caplan, Jessica Lucas, T.J. Miller (in his film debut), Michael Stahl-David, Mike Vogel, and Odette Yustman. In the film, six friends attempt to flee from a monster that attacks New York City.

Development began when producer J. J. Abrams started conceptualizing a monster movie and enlisted Neville Page to design the eventual creature, called Clover. In February 2007, the project was secretly greenlit by Paramount Pictures and produced by Abrams's Bad Robot. Principal photography took place in Los Angeles and New York City in 2007. The project had several working titles, including Slusho, Cheese, and Greyshot. As part of a viral marketing campaign, a teaser trailer was released ahead of screenings of Transformers (2007) without a title. The final title was revealed in a second teaser trailer attached to screenings of Beowulf (2007). With limited pre-release details, it garnered online speculation, including forums and websites dedicated to uncovering hidden information about the film. Several tie-ins, including a prequel manga series, were released as part of the marketing campaign.

Cloverfield was released on January 18, 2008, and received generally positive reviews from critics, who praised Reeves's direction and the cinéma vérité style narrative. It earned $172.4 million worldwide at the box office against a $25 million budget. It is the first installment of the Cloverfield franchise, followed by 10 Cloverfield Lane in 2016 and The Cloverfield Paradox in 2018. A direct sequel is in development.

== Plot ==
The footage from a personal camcorder is recovered by the U.S. Department of Defense in the area "formerly known as Central Park", bearing a disclaimer about multiple sightings of a case designated "Cloverfield".

On April 27, 2008, Rob Hawkins wakes up with Beth McIntyre in her father's apartment before embarking on a date across New York City and Coney Island.

On May 22, 2008, Rob's brother Jason and Jason's girlfriend, Lily Ford, throw a surprise farewell party for Rob at his Lower Manhattan apartment before he moves to Japan for his new job. Jason asks Rob's best friend, Hudson "Hud" Platt, to film testimonials for Rob during the party. Beth, upset by Rob's lack of communication after their one-night stand, brings another man to the party. Beth and Rob argue, and she leaves shortly before an earthquake occurs, causing a brief citywide power outage. The local news reports a capsized oil tanker near Liberty Island. From the roof, the partygoers witness an explosion in the distance and flee as flaming debris flies in their direction. As they leave the building, the severed head of the Statue of Liberty is thrown into the city and lands in the street nearby. In the chaos, Hud records an enormous creature several blocks away, collapsing the Woolworth Building. Rob, Jason, Lily, and Hud take cover in a nearby convenience store, sheltering from the smoke and debris of the building's collapse. When they emerge, they find their friend Marlena Diamond covered in dust, in shock from seeing the creature "eating people".

As the group attempts to evacuate Manhattan by crossing the Brooklyn Bridge, Rob receives a call from Beth, who is trapped in her apartment at the Time Warner Center. The creature appears and destroys the bridge, killing Jason. The others retreat to an electronics store in Lower Manhattan, where news reports show the Army National Guard's 42nd Infantry Division attacking the creature, as well as smaller parasites falling off the creature's body and attacking soldiers and civilians.

Rob, Hud, Lily, and Marlena venture up to Midtown Manhattan to rescue Beth from her apartment. After being caught in a battle between the creature and the military, they hide in a nearby subway station and decide that staying underground will be safer. While walking through the subway tunnels toward Midtown, they are attacked by a group of parasites, one of which bites Marlena. The four escape the tunnels and enter Bloomingdale's, and are then found by soldiers and taken to a field hospital within. When Marlena turns pale and begins to bleed from her eyes, she is forcibly taken away from the others by a biohazard team before her body swells and explodes. Rob, still intending to save Beth, persuades a commander to release them. He is informed when the last evacuation helicopter will depart before the military executes its "Hammerdown Protocol", a saturation bombing operation which may kill the creature but will also destroy Manhattan.

Rob, Hud and Lily travel to the Time Warner Center, find Beth impaled on exposed rebar in her damaged apartment, and rescue her. The quartet then travel to the evacuation point at Grand Central Terminal, and reach the evacuation helicopters. Lily is rushed into the first departing helicopter, while Rob, Beth, and Hud are evacuated in a second helicopter, and witness the creature being heavily bombed by a B-2 Spirit. The creature briefly collapses, but rises from the smoke and strikes the helicopter, causing it to crash in Central Park. The trio survive the crash and escape from the wreckage, but the creature approaches the crash site and kills Hud. Rob and Beth grab the camera and take shelter under Greyshot Arch. As air raid sirens blare, they each provide their last testimony of the day's events. The arch begins to crumble as the bombing commences, and the camera is knocked out of Rob's hand and buried beneath the rubble. Rob and Beth proclaim their love for each other, and are heard screaming as the footage cuts out.

The film ends with the finale of Rob and Beth's trip to Coney Island a month earlier. Unseen by them, a barely discernible object falls from the sky and into the ocean (in the right area of the footage).

After the credits, a voice can be heard seemingly saying, "Help us". When played in reverse, it says "It's still alive".

== Cast ==
- Michael Stahl-David as Rob Hawkins, preparing to leave for Japan for a new job, while dealing with complicated feelings about Beth
- Odette Yustman as Beth McIntyre, long-time platonic friend of Rob
- T.J. Miller as Hud Platt, the cameraman capturing the events and Rob's best friend
- Jessica Lucas as Lily Ford, Jason's fiancée
- Lizzy Caplan as Marlena Diamond, Lily's friend and Hud's crush
- Mike Vogel as Jason Hawkins, Rob's brother
- Ben Feldman as Travis Marello, Beth's friend
- Margot Farley as Jenn, Rob's friend and Antonio's girlfriend
- Theo Rossi as Antonio, Rob's friend and Jenn's boyfriend
- Kelvin Yu as Clark, a friend of Rob and Hud
- Liza Lapira as Heather, Lei and Lily's friend
- Lili Mirojnick as Lei, Heather and Lily's friend
- Brian Klugman as Charlie, a partygoer
- Jamie Harlan as Jamie Lascano, a partygoer who previously appeared in the Cloverfield Alternate Reality game
- Billy Brown as Sergeant Pryce, coordinates an evacuation station and warns the survivors about the impending "Hammerdown" protocol

In addition, NY1 TV journalist Roma Torre has a cameo as herself, reporting on a television screen watched by the party-goers. The film's director, Matt Reeves, provides the uncredited voice for the two brief phrases (one normal, one in reversed audio) after the credits.

== Production ==
=== Development ===
J. J. Abrams conceived a monster film after he and his son visited a toy store in Japan while promoting Mission: Impossible III. He explained, "We saw all these Godzilla toys, and I thought, we need our own American monster, and not like King Kong. I love King Kong. King Kong is adorable. And Godzilla is a charming monster. We love Godzilla, but I wanted something that was just insane and intense."

In February 2007, Paramount Pictures secretly greenlit Cloverfield, to be produced by Abrams, directed by Matt Reeves, and written by Drew Goddard. Abrams and Reeves have been friends since they were 13 years old and went on to co-create the college drama series Felicity for The WB, while Goddard was a writer for ABC's Lost at the time (also co-created by Abrams). The project was produced by Abrams's company, Bad Robot.

The severed head of the Statue of Liberty was inspired by the poster of the 1981 film Escape from New York, in which the head lies on a street in New York. Reeves explained, "It's an incredibly provocative image. And that was the source that inspired producer J. J. Abrams to say, 'Now this would be an interesting idea for a movie'."

=== Title ===
The film was initially titled Cloverfield, changed several times throughout production, and was reverted. Matt Reeves explained this was due to the hype caused by the teaser trailer. "That excitement spread to such a degree that we suddenly couldn't use the name anymore. So we started using all these names like Slusho and Cheese. And people always found out what we were doing!" He said that "Cloverfield" was the government's case designation for the events caused by the monster, comparing the titling to that of the real Manhattan Project, though the government did not originate this. Cloverfield Blvd is the highway exit Abrams takes to his Santa Monica office, and which used to lead to the Santa Monica Airport, which originally bore the name Clover Field.

The final title Greyshot was proposed, taken from the archway that the two survivors take shelter under at the end of the movie, but Matt Reeves said this was rejected because the film was already so well known as Cloverfield.

The film received a subtitle in Japan, where it was released as Cloverfield/Hakaisha (クローバーフィールド/HAKAISHA, Kurōbāfīrudo/HAKAISHA). The subtitle "Destroyer" was chosen by Abrams and was translated into Japanese as Hakaisha (破壊者, lit. "Destroyer") by Paramount Japan at his request. The subtitle Kishin (鬼神, lit. "Fierce God") was chosen for the manga spin-off, Cloverfield/Kishin, released exclusively in Japan.

=== Casting ===
Casting was done in secret, with no script sent to candidates. To prevent the leaking of plot information, instead of auditioning the actors with scenes from the film, scripts from Abrams's previous productions were used, such as the television series Alias and Lost. Some scenes were also written specifically for the audition process, not intended for use in the film. Lizzy Caplan stated that she accepted a role in Cloverfield without knowing the premise, solely because she was a fan of the Abrams-produced Lost, and her experience of discovering its true nature initially caused her to state that she would not sign on for a film in the future "without knowing full well what it is". She indicated that her character was a sarcastic outsider, and that her role was "physically demanding".

=== Production ===
With an estimated production budget of $30 million, principal photography began in mid-June 2007 in New York. Caplan said that the film would look like it cost $150 million, though without recognizable and expensive actors. Filmmakers used the Panasonic HVX200 for most of the interior scenes, and the Sony CineAlta F23 high-definition video camera to record nearly all of the New York exterior scenes. Filming took place on Coney Island, with scenes shot at Deno's Wonder Wheel Amusement Park and the B&B Carousell. The scenes of tanks firing at the creature while the main characters hide in a stairwell were filmed on Hennesy Street on Warner Bros. Studios backlot in Burbank, California. Some interior shots were taped on a soundstage at Downey, California. Bloomingdale's in the movie was actually shot in an emptied Robinsons-May store that was under reconstruction in Arcadia, California. The outside scenes of Sephora and the electronics store were taped in Downtown Los Angeles.

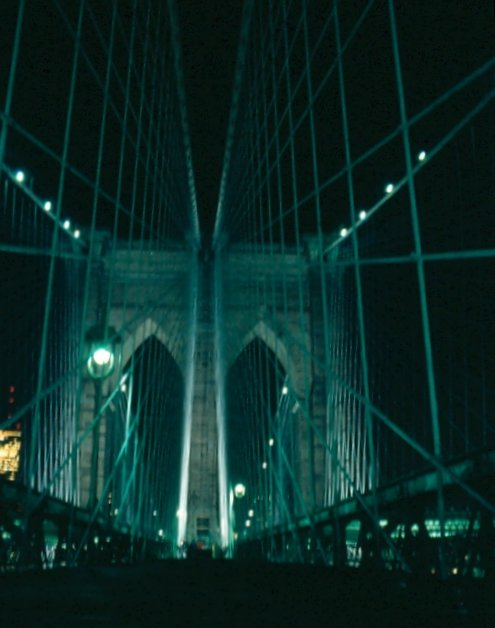
Brooklyn Bridge, as viewed through the film's first-person narrative

The film was shot and edited in a cinéma vérité style, to look like it was taped with one hand-held camera, including jump cuts similar to ones found in home movies. T. J. Miller, who plays Hud, has said in various interviews that he taped a third of the movie and almost half of it made it into the film. Director Matt Reeves described the presentation, "We wanted this to be as if someone found a Handicam, took out the tape and put it in the player to watch it. What you're watching is a home movie that then turns into something else." Reeves explained that the pedestrians documenting the severed head of the Statue of Liberty with the camera phones was reflective of the contemporary period. According to him: "Cloverfield very much speaks to the fear and anxieties of our time, how we live our lives. Constantly documenting things and putting them up on YouTube, sending people videos through e-mail – we felt it was very applicable to the way people feel now."

VFX and CGI were produced by effects studios Double Negative and Tippett Studio.

Several of the filmmakers are heard but not seen in the film. The man yelling "Oh my God!" repeatedly when the head of the Statue of Liberty lands in the street is producer Bryan Burk, and director Matt Reeves voiced the whispered radio broadcast at the end of the credits. After viewing a cut of the film, Steven Spielberg suggested giving the audience a hint at the fate of the monster during the climax, which resulted in the addition of a countdown overheard on the helicopter's radio and the sounding of air raid sirens to signal the forthcoming Hammer Down bombing.

==== Style of cinematography ====
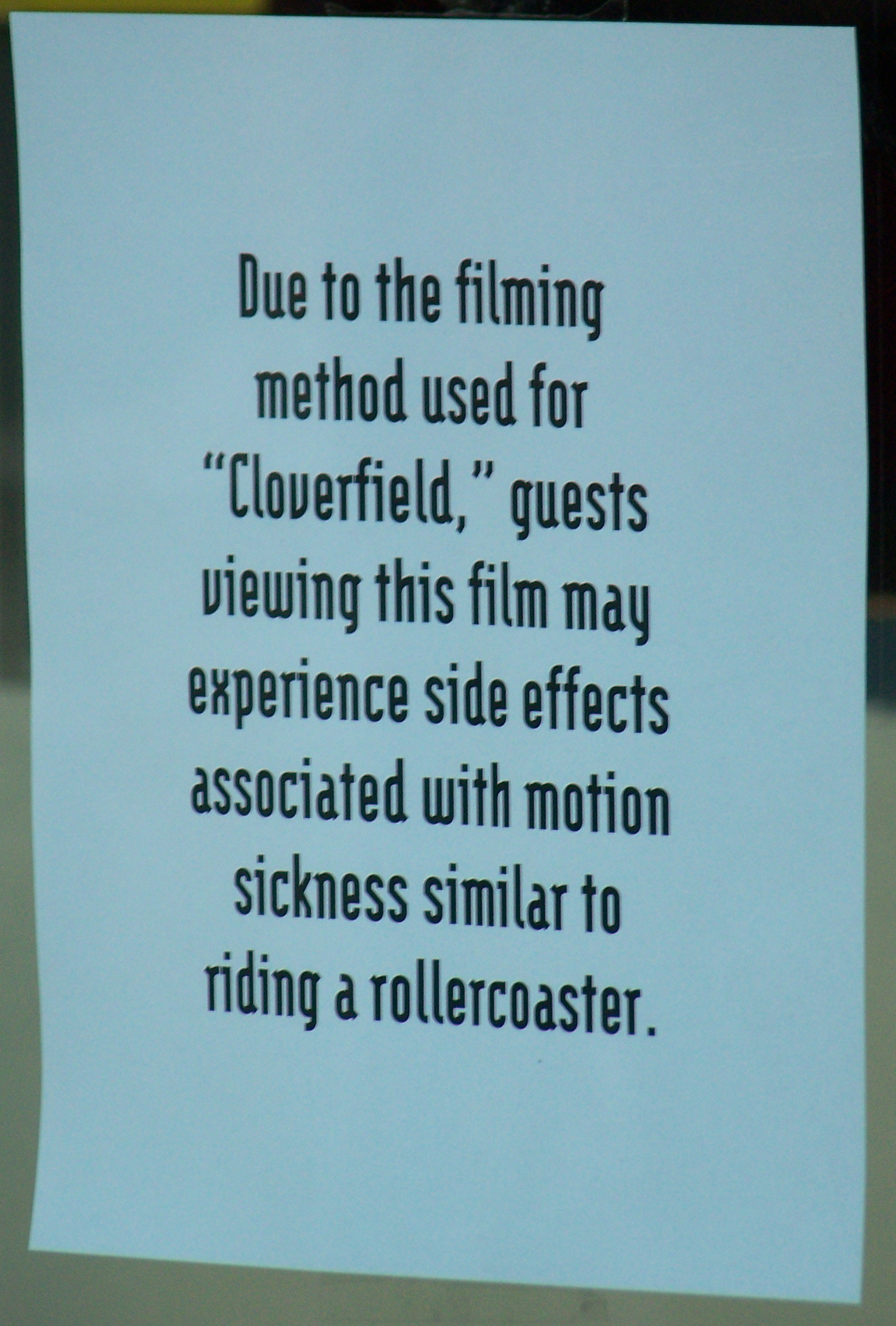
Sign at an AMC theater warning customers by comparing the film to a roller coaster.

The film's shaky camera style of cinematography, dubbed "La Shakily Queasy-Cam" by Roger Ebert, caused some viewers (particularly in darkened movie theaters) to experience motion sickness, including nausea and a temporary loss of balance. Audience members prone to migraines have cited the film as a trigger. Some theaters showing the film, such as AMC Theatres, provided poster and verbal warnings, informing viewers about the filming style of Cloverfield, while other theatres like Pacific Theatres just verbally warned customers in detail at the box office about experiencing motion sickness upon viewing the film and what to do if they had to step out and vomit.

=== Creature design ===
Visual main effects supervisor Nick Tom and Phil Tippett's "Tippett Studio" were enlisted to develop the visual effects for Cloverfield. Because the visual effects were incorporated after filming, cast members were only familiar with early conceptual renderings of the beast and had to react to an unseen creature during their scenes. Artist Neville Page designed the monster, creating a biological rationale for it, though many of his ideas, including an "elongated, articulated external esophagus", would not show up on screen. His central concept was that of an immature creature suffering from "separation anxiety." This recalls real-life circus elephants who get frightened and lash out. The director stated that "there's nothing scarier than something huge that's spooked."

== Marketing ==
Before the film's release, Paramount carried out a viral marketing campaign to promote the film which included viral tie-ins similar to Lost Experience. Filmmakers decided to create a teaser trailer that would be a surprise in the light of commonplace media saturation. Rather than edit the teaser from footage taken from the finished film, footage was captured during the preparation stages solely for creation of the teaser. Ernest Holzman, who would later be replaced with Lost cinematographer Michael Bonvillain, used the Thomson Viper FilmStream Camera for the shoot. The teaser was then used as a basis for the film itself. Paramount Pictures encouraged the teaser to be released without a title attached, and the Motion Picture Association of America approved the move. As Transformers showed high tracking numbers before its release in July 2007, the studio attached the teaser trailer for Cloverfield that showed the release date of January 18, 2008, but not the title. A second trailer was released on November 16, 2007, which was attached to Beowulf, confirming the title.

The studio had kept knowledge of the project secret from the online community, a cited rarity due to the presence of scoopers that follow upcoming films. The controlled release of information on the film has been observed as a risky strategy, which could succeed like The Blair Witch Project (1999) or disappoint like Snakes on a Plane (2006), the latter of which had generated online hype but failed to attract large audiences.

=== Pre-release plot speculation ===
The sudden appearance of the untitled teaser for Cloverfield, and limited details available in the lead up to the film's release fueled wide media speculation over the film's plot, with many expecting it to be an adaptation of an existing property. Among the possibilities reported on, The Star Ledger suggested that the film could be based on the works of H. P. Lovecraft, or a new entry in the Godzilla series. The Guardian reported the possibility of a spin-off to Abrams' television show Lost, and a misinterpretation of the trailer's line "It's alive!" as "It's a lion!" led USA Today to speculate on a live-action adaptation of Japanese animated series Voltron. IGN and Time Out suggested that the film would feature an alien called "The Parasite", with that rumored to be the working title of the film. Elsewhere online, Slusho and Colossus had been discussed as other possible titles, as well as Monstrous, although this was dispelled by Abrams at ComicCon.

The viral marketing campaign drew the attention of alternate reality game enthusiasts, hoping to uncover information about the film hidden online. Members of the forums at argn.com and unfiction.com have investigated the background of the film, with the "1-18-08" section at Unfiction generating over 7,700 posts in August 2007. The members have studied photographs on the film's official site, potentially related MySpace profiles, and the Comic-Con teaser poster for the film. A popular piece of fan art posited that the monster was a mutated humpback whale.

=== Viral tie-ins ===
All of the major characters received a personal Myspace page, all of which are accessible and featuring available photos, though blog posts have been removed.

Unlike most viral marketing campaigns, this one had virtually nothing to do with the film's plot or characters. Instead it focused mainly on the fictional drink Slusho! and the fictional company Tagruato, slowly giving clues of the secret origin of the monster that isn't addressed properly in the film. Following various clues, players discovered that the monster is an ancient amphibious organism discovered during the construction of Chuai Station, an oil platform off the coast of Connecticut belonging to the Japanese company Tagruato, which has been repurposed for the extraction of a substance called Sea Bed Nectar that would become the secret ingredient of a drink created by its founder Ganu Yoshida, named Slusho. Tagurato carries out a coverup involving the ordered assassination of the employee who originally made the discovery, and also uses the platform for surveillance of the monster and its parasites, who are using Sea Bed's nectar as a means of nourishment for their host, applying the substance on its back. Eventually, the monster awakens and destroys the station, before finding its way to the shores of New York at the beginning of the film.

Puzzle websites containing Lovecraftian elements, such as Ethan Haas Was Right, were originally reported to be connected to the film. On July 9, 2007, producer J. J. Abrams stated that, while a number of websites were being developed to market the film, the only official site that had been found was 1–18–08.com. At the site, which now redirects to the Paramount Pictures home page, a collection of time-coded photos were available to piece together a series of events and interpret their meanings. The pictures could also be flipped over by repeatedly and rapidly moving the mouse side to side. Also, if the page was left open for six minutes, the monster's roar could be heard. Eventually, CloverfieldMovie.com was created. The site provided both a trailer and a number, 33287, which, when texted from a mobile phone, provided a ringtone of the monster's roar and a wallpaper of a decimated Manhattan. This eventually turns out to be a Paramount number (people later received material on Iron Man, Indiana Jones and the Kingdom of the Crystal Skull, Kung Fu Panda, and The Love Guru).

The drink Slusho! served as part of the viral marketing campaign. The drink had already appeared in producer Abrams' previous creation, the TV series Alias. Websites for Slusho! and Taguruato were launched to add to the mythology of Cloverfield. The Japanese phone number in the Tagruato website did work, but only played recorded messages. For example, one of the messages was: "Thank you for calling Tagruato. Due to high call volumes, your call has been transferred to an automated answering service. There are no updates at this time. After the tone, please leave a message, and one of our associates will find you as soon as possible". A building bearing the company logo for Tagruato can also be seen in the TV spot of the 2009 Star Trek film, and Uhura orders a Slusho! during the bar scene. When Cloverfield was hosted at Comic-Con 2007, gray Slusho! T-shirts were distributed to attendees. Fans who had registered at the Slusho! website received e-mails of fictional sonar images before the film's release that showed a deep-sea creature heading toward Manhattan. Fans who ordered merchandise received pieces of torn Tagruato documents and Japanese newspapers along with their products. A cup of Slusho! appears briefly in The Cloverfield Paradox, and it has also appeared in Fringe, Super 8, and Heroes. A Slusho! bobblehead figure also appears shaking in The Cloverfield Paradox trailer and film.

Producer Burk explained the viral tie-in, "It was all done in conjunction with the studio... The whole experience in making this movie is very reminiscent of how we did Lost." Director Reeves described Slusho! as "part of the involved connectivity" with Abrams' Alias and that the drink represented a "meta-story" for Cloverfield. The director explained:

It's almost like tentacles that grow out of the film and lead, also, to the ideas in the film. And there's this weird way where you can go see the movie and it's one experience... But there's also this other place where you can get engaged where there's this other sort of aspect for all those people who are into that. All the stories kind of bounce off one another and inform each other. But, at the end of the day, this movie stands on its own to be a movie.... The Internet sort of stories and connections and clues are, in a way, a prism and they're another way of looking at the same thing. To us, it's just another exciting aspect of the storytelling.

=== Merchandise ===
A four-installment prequel manga series by Yoshiki Togawa titled Cloverfield/Kishin (クローバーフィールド/KISHIN, Kurōbāfīrudo/KISHIN) was released by Japanese publisher Kadokawa Shoten. The story focuses on a Japanese high school student named Kishin Aiba, who somehow bears a connection to the monster.

Based on the film's successful opening weekend, Hasbro began accepting orders for a 14-inch (36 cm) collectible toy figure of the monster with authentic sound and its parasites that were shipped to fans by December 24, 2008.

== Music ==
Rob's Party Mix

Compilation album by various artists
- Released: January 17, 2008
- Length: 64:02

Due to its presentation as footage from a consumer digital recorder, Cloverfield has no film score, with the exception of the composition "Roar! (Cloverfield Overture)" by Michael Giacchino that plays over the end credits. Similarities between "Roar!" and the music of Godzilla composer Akira Ifukube have been noted, and it has been suggested that Giacchino's overture is a tribute to Ifukube's work, which was confirmed by Matt Reeves in the DVD's commentary track. The soundtrack was supervised by William Files and Douglas Murray at Skywalker Sound.

Rob's Party Mix or Cloverfield Mix is a collection of the music played in the opening party sequences of the film that was released exclusively on Apple's iTunes Store on January 22, 2008, in lieu of a traditional soundtrack album. The Cloverfield score, "Roar! (Cloverfield Overture)" by Michael Giacchino that plays over the end credits is not featured on the album, as it is the mixtape played at the party and is not the official soundtrack of the film. This album was distributed to guests at a Cloverfield premiere party held at the Dark Room in New York City on January 17, 2008.

A complete soundtrack release of all the music in the film, including Giacchino's "Roar!" end title piece, has now also been released exclusively on iTunes; it has not been officially released in retail stores. A CD entitled Rob's Party Mix comes packaged in a special edition of Cloverfield made available for sale in Canadian Wal-Mart stores beginning on April 22, 2008.

Track listing
No.	Title	Artist	Length
1.	"West Coast"	Coconut Records	3:32
2.	"Taper Jean Girl"	Kings of Leon	3:05
3.	"Beautiful Girls"	Sean Kingston	4:01
4.	"Do I Have Your Attention"	The Blood Arm	3:35
5.	"Got Your Moments"	Scissors for Lefty	3:11
6.	"Give Up the Funk (Tear the Roof off the Sucker)"	Parliament	5:46
7.	"19-2000"	Gorillaz	3:27
8.	"The Underdog"	Spoon	3:42
9.	"Pistol of Fire"	Kings of Leon	2:20
10.	"Disco Lies"	Moby	3:22
11.	"Do the Whirlwind"	Architecture in Helsinki	4:39
12.	"Grown So Ugly"	The Black Keys	2:24
13.	"Four Winds"	Bright Eyes	2:09
14.	"The Ride"	Joan As Policewoman	3:09
15.	"Seventeen Years"	Ratatat	4:26
16.	"Wraith Pinned to the Mist and Other Games"	Of Montreal	4:15
17.	"Fuzz" (ファズ)	Mucc	4:47

== Release ==
=== Theatrical ===
First publicized in a teaser trailer in screenings of Transformers, the film was released on January 17, 2008, in New Zealand, Russia and Australia; January 18 in North America; January 24 in South Korea; January 25 in Taiwan; January 31 in Germany; and February 1 in the United Kingdom, Ireland and Italy. In Japan, the film was released on April 5.

=== Home media ===
The DVD was released on April 22, 2008, in two versions: the standard single-disc edition and an exclusive "steel-book" special edition that was sold at Suncoast and FYE retailers in the US and Future Shop in Canada. Other store exclusives include an exclusive bonus disc titled "T. J. Miller's Video Diary" with the DVD at all Best Buy retailers, an exclusive mix CD titled "Rob's Goin' to Japan Party Mix" with the DVD at all Target and Wal-Mart retailers and an exclusive ringtone with the DVD at all Kmart and Sears retailers. Borders also had an exclusive booklet encased with their DVD.

The Region 2 DVD was released on June 9 in both one-disc and two-disc editions. The limited steel-book edition is only available from HMV, while Play.com offers exclusive cover artwork. The HMV-exclusive steel-book contains two discs.

The DVD includes two alternative endings, which vary only slightly. The first alternative ending shows Rob and Beth exiting the Coney Island–Stillwell Avenue station instead of on the Ferris wheel and features different sirens in the background as Rob talks to the camera. In the second alternative ending, just after the final explosion, Beth can be heard screaming "Rob!" followed by a brief clip of an unknown person looking at the camera (in the commentary, Reeves stated that it was one of the crew members) and brushing rubble off the lens. The film then ends with the original final clip of Rob and Beth on their Coney Island date recording themselves on the Ferris Wheel as the camera tape runs out, with two differences: there is no timestamp in the lower left-hand corner of the screen, and there is an additional beeping tone indicating the end of the tape.

A Blu-ray edition was released on June 3, 2008. It includes a "Special Investigation Mode", as well as all the bonus features of the 2-disc DVD in HD.

On the film's 10th anniversary, Paramount issued a 4k UHD Blu-ray version of the film, accompanied by the standard Blu-ray and bonus extras. It was released on January 23, 2018.

== Reception ==
=== Box office ===
Cloverfield opened in 3,411 theaters on January 18, 2008, and grossed a total of $16,930,000 on its opening day in the United States and Canada. It made $40.1 million on its opening weekend, which at the time was the most successful January release (record then taken by Ride Along in 2014 with a weekend gross of $41.5 million). Moreover, the film simultaneously beat Titanic and Black Hawk Down to have the biggest Martin Luther King Jr. Day weekend and opening weekend grosses. Worldwide, it has grossed $170,602,318, making it the first movie in 2008 to gross over $100 million. In Japan, the film held the top spot in the box office rankings for one week before the release of Kamen Rider Den-O & Kiva: Climax Deka took the top spot in its first weekend.

=== Critical reception ===
On Rotten Tomatoes, the film holds an approval rating of 78% based on 213 reviews, with an average rating of 6.80/10. The website's critical consensus reads, "A sort of Blair Witch Project crossed with Godzilla, Cloverfield is economically paced, stylistically clever, and filled with scares". According to Metacritic, the film has received an average score of 64 out of 100 based on 37 reviews, indicating "generally favorable" reviews. Audiences polled by CinemaScore gave the film an average grade of "C" on an A+ to F scale.

Marc Savlov of The Austin Chronicle called the film "the most intense and original creature feature I've seen in my adult moviegoing life [...] a pure-blood, grade A, exhilarating monster movie". He cites Matt Reeves' direction, the "whip-smart, stylistically invisible" script and the "nearly subconscious evocation of our current paranoid, terror-phobic times" as the keys to the film's success, saying that telling the story through the lens of one character's camera "works fantastically well". Michael Rechtshaffen of The Hollywood Reporter called it "chillingly effective", generally praising the effects and the film's "claustrophobic intensity". He said that though the characters "aren't particularly interesting or developed", there was "something refreshing about a monster movie that isn't filled with the usual suspects". Lisa Schwarzbaum of Entertainment Weekly said that the film was "surreptitiously subversive, [a] stylistically clever little gem", and that while the characters were "vapid, twenty-something nincompoops" and the acting "appropriately unmemorable", the decision to tell the story through amateur footage was "brilliant". Roger Ebert in the Chicago Sun-Times gave the film three stars out of four and wrote that it is "pretty scary at times" and cites "unmistakable evocations of 9/11". He concludes that "all in all, it is an effective film, deploying its special effects well and never breaking the illusion that it is all happening as we see it".

Todd McCarthy of Variety called the film an "old-fashioned monster movie dressed up in trendy new threads", praising the special effects, "nihilistic attitude" and "post-9/11 anxiety overlay." but said, "In the end, [it's] not much different from all the marauding creature features that have come before it". Scott Foundas of LA Weekly was critical of the film's use of scenes reminiscent of the September 11 attacks in New York City and called it "cheap and opportunistic". He suggested that the film was engaging in "stealth" attempts at social commentary and compared this unfavorably to the films of Don Siegel, George A. Romero and Steven Spielberg, saying, "Where those filmmakers all had something meaningful to say about the state of the world and [...] human nature, Abrams doesn't have much to say about anything". Manohla Dargis in the New York Times called the allusions "tacky", saying, "[The images] may make you think of the attack, and you may curse the filmmakers for their vulgarity, insensitivity or lack of imagination", but that "the film is too dumb to offend anything except your intelligence". She concludes that the film "works as a showcase for impressively realistic-looking special effects, a realism that fails to extend to the scurrying humans whose fates are meant to invoke pity and fear but instead inspire yawns and contempt". Stephanie Zacharek of Salon.com calls the film "badly constructed, humorless and emotionally sadistic", and sums up by saying that the film "takes the trauma of 9/11 and turns it into just another random spectacle at which to point and shoot". Michael Phillips of the Chicago Tribune warned that the viewer may feel "queasy" at the references to September 11, but that "other sequences [...] carry a real jolt" and that such tactics were "crude, but undeniably gripping." He called the film "dumb", but "quick and dirty and effectively brusque", concluding that despite it being "a harsher, more demographically calculating brand of fun", he enjoyed the film. Bruce Paterson of Cinephilia described the film as "a successful experiment in style but not necessarily a successful story for those who want dramatic closure". Some critics also pointed out the similarity to the Half-Life video game series, in particular the "Ant-lion" monsters from Half-Life 2, and the constant first-person perspective.

Empire magazine named it the fifth best film of 2008. The French film journal Cahiers du Cinéma named the film as the third best of 2008. Bloody Disgusting ranked the film number twenty in their list of the "Top 20 Horror Films of the Decade", with the article calling the film "A brilliant conceit, to be sure, backed by a genius early marketing campaign that followed the less-is-more philosophy to tantalizing effect...much like Blair Witch nearly ten years earlier, Cloverfield helped prove, particularly in its first half hour, that what you don't see can be the scariest thing of all". In 2022, Aedan Juvet of Screen Rant revisited the original film, labeling it as an "influential" found footage, sci-fi hybrid.

=== Accolades ===
Year	Award	Category	Recipient(s)	Result	Ref.
2008	Saturn Awards	Best Science Fiction Film	Cloverfield	Won	
2008	Saturn Awards	Best Supporting Actress	Lizzy Caplan	Nominated	
2008	Golden Schmoes Awards	Best Horror Movie of the Year	Cloverfield	Won	
2008	Golden Schmoes Awards	Most Underrated Movie of the Year	Cloverfield	Nominated	
2008	Golden Schmoes Awards	Trippiest Movie of the Year	Cloverfield	Nominated	
2008	Golden Schmoes Awards	Best Sci-Fi Movie of the Year	Cloverfield	Nominated	
2008	Golden Schmoes Awards	Best Special Effects of the Year	Cloverfield	Nominated	
2008	Golden Schmoes Awards	Favorite Movie Poster of the Year	Cloverfield	Nominated	
2008	Golden Schmoes Awards	Best Trailer of the Year	Cloverfield	Nominated	
2008	Golden Trailer Awards	Best Thriller	Cloverfield	Nominated	
2008	Golden Trailer Awards	Most Original	Cloverfield	Nominated	
2008	Internet Film Critics Society Awards	Most Experimental Film	Cloverfield	Won	
2008	Italian Online Movie Awards	Best Special Effects	Cloverfield	Nominated	
2008	Scream Awards	Best Science Fiction Movie	Cloverfield	Nominated	
2008	Teen Choice Awards	Choice Movie: Horror/Thriller	Cloverfield	Nominated	
2008	Teen Choice Awards	Choice Movie: Horror/Thriller Actor	Michael Stahl-David	Nominated	
2008	Teen Choice Awards	Choice Movie: Horror/Thriller Actress	Odette Yustman	Nominated	
2009	ASCAP Film and Television Music Awards	Top Box Office Films	Michael Giacchino	Won	
2009	International Film Music Critics Awards	Film Music Composition of the Year	Michael Giacchino	Nominated	
2009	Fangoria Chainsaw Awards	Best Wide Release Film	Cloverfield	Nominated	
2009	Fangoria Chainsaw Awards	Worst Film	Cloverfield	Nominated	
2009	Fangoria Chainsaw Awards	Best Score	Michael Giacchino	Won	
2009	Gold Derby Awards	Visual Effects	Kevin Blank, Mike Ellis and Eric Leven	Nominated	
2009	Golden Reel Awards	Best Sound Editing - Dialogue and ADR in a Feature Film	Douglas Murray, Will Files, Cheryl Nardi, Sue Fox and Gwendolyn Yates Whittle	Nominated	
2009	Golden Reel Awards	Best Sound Editing - Sound Effects and Foley in a Feature Film	Will Files, Douglas Murray, Luke Dunn Gielmuda, Robert Shoup, Josh Gold, Andrea Gard, Steve Bissinger, Kim Foscato, Samuel H. Hinckley, Andy Malcolm and Goro Koyama	Nominated	
2009	International Online Cinema Awards	Best Visual Effects	Cloverfield	Nominated	
2009	International Online Cinema Awards	Best Sound Mixing	Anna Behlmer, Will Files and Ed White	Nominated	
2009	International Online Cinema Awards	Best Sound Editing	Douglas Murray and Will Files	Nominated	
2009	Visual Effects Society Awards	Outstanding Visual Effects in a Visual Effects-Driven Feature Motion Picture	Cloverfield	Nominated	
2009	Visual Effects Society Awards	Best Single Visual Effect of the Year	Cloverfield	Nominated	
2009	Visual Effects Society Awards	Outstanding Created Environment in a Feature Motion Picture	Cloverfield	Nominated	

== Sequels ==
At the Cloverfield premiere, director Matt Reeves talked about possibilities of what a sequel would look like if the film succeeded. According to Reeves:

While we were on set making the film we talked about the possibilities and directions of how a sequel can go. The fun of this movie was that it might not have been the only movie being made that night, there might be another movie! In today's day and age of people filming their lives on their camera phones and Handycams, uploading it to YouTube... That was kind of exciting thinking about that.

In another interview, Reeves stated:

There's a moment on the Brooklyn Bridge, and there was a guy filming something on the side of the bridge, and Hud sees him filming and he turns over and he sees the ship that's been capsized and sees the headless Statue of Liberty, and then he turns back and this guy's briefly filming him. In my mind that was two movies intersecting for a brief moment, and I thought there was something interesting in the idea that this incident happened and there are so many different points of view, and there are several different movies at least happening that evening and we just saw one piece of another.

Reeves also pointed out that the final scene on Coney Island shows something falling into the ocean in the background without an explanation. This may have been either the satellite owned by the fictional Japanese media company, Tagruato, or the creature itself. A company news piece on the Tagruato website mentions that a piece of the Japanese Government's ChimpanzII satellite fell off into the Atlantic. Producers Bryan Burk and J. J. Abrams also revealed their thoughts on possible sequels to Entertainment Weekly. According to Burk, "The creative team has fleshed out an entire backstory which, if we're lucky, we might get to explore in future films". Abrams stated that he did not want to rush into the development of the sequel merely because the first film was a success; he explained that he would rather create a sequel that is true to the previous film.

At the end of January 2008, Reeves entered early talks with Paramount to direct a sequel, which was planned to be filmed before Reeves's other project, The Invisible Woman. Reeves said:

The idea of doing something so differently is exhilarating. We hope that it created a movie experience that is different. The thing about doing a sequel is that I think we all really feel protective of that experience. The key here will be if we can find something that is compelling enough and that is different enough for us to do, then it will probably be worth doing. Obviously it also depends on how Cloverfield does worldwide and all of those things too, but really, for us creatively, we just want to find something that would be another challenge.

In September 2008, when asked by CraveOnline what the status was on Cloverfield 2, Abrams stated that at that point they were still discussing it; however, he still felt reluctant to work on a sequel. In the same interview, Abrams said that they were working on something that "could be kind of cool." When asked if it would take place in a different location, Abrams replied by saying that "it would be a totally different kind of thing but it's too early to talk about." In a 2010 interview with Attack of the Show!, Abrams stated that they might abandon the filming style, stating that he and the rest of the crew would like to try something new.

The film Super 8 was initially speculated to be either a sequel or prequel to Cloverfield, but this was quickly denied by Abrams.

In January 2011, horror film fan site BloodyDisgusting.com stated that a Cloverfield sequel may never happen. They talked to director Reeves and he said that if he can ever get the time to sit down and talk with Drew Goddard and J. J. Abrams about sequel possibilities they will certainly make a sequel, but due to all three's busy schedules Reeves did not see this happening any time soon. In a 2011 interview, Matt Reeves gave an update on the status of Cloverfield 2, saying:

Getting the right idea together has been taking a long time. ... You are going to see it – we just don't know when [laughs] ... At the moment we are talking about the story quite a lot. Drew Goddard, who wrote the original, is going to pen the sequel and J. J. Abrams is very much involved. ... However, the three of us have been so busy that getting the right idea together has been taking a long time.

When asked if the sequel would be shot in real time, Reeves stated, "You see, that's a difficult part: we want it to be shot like the first but how can you continue that idea successfully for a second time? ... We have a lot of affection for the original and the sequel can't just be the same thing. But that is tricky when you need to have a monster destroying stuff once again."

In a 2012 interview, screenwriter Goddard gave an update saying, "I'm in, I'm ready to do it...someone call J. J. and tell him to get moving, but because Matt and J. J. and I have been fortunate enough to be busy, it's hard syncing our schedules up. We're all very passionate about returning to that world." When asked if an idea was on paper, he responded, "If you asked each of us what we wanted to do, you'll get three different answers, which is how the first film was. The aesthetic of Cloverfield benefits from that. Three voices pulling it. Look, nothing would make me happier than to get the three of us in the room to get started." In a later interview in April of that same year, Goddard said:

We didn't set out to make a franchise, we set out to make a good movie. But I love that world and that universe, so if there was an idea that excited us enough, and we felt like there was a reason to do it, we would do it. The nice thing about when you work with a guy like J. J., and the power he gets, the studio's not going to force him to do anything. And he has been able to say, we'll do it when we're ready. We're not going to just do it because it will help your bottom line, we're going to do it because there's an idea that excites us. And so that's informed our discussions. We don't feel like we have to, so it's like 'Can we come up with something that excites us enough to do it?'

On January 14, 2016, 10 Cloverfield Lane was revealed by Bad Robot, with Abrams as a producer and Reeves and Goddard credited as executive producers. The film was described as "a blood relative" but not "a literal sequel" to Cloverfield by Abrams, who produced the film. The film was released on March 11, 2016, marking the theatrical feature film directorial debut of Dan Trachtenberg.

During an interview with Abrams to promote 10 Cloverfield Lane, he said the creative team behind the original had some ideas on developing Cloverfield 2, but the release of movies such as Godzilla and Pacific Rim led them to abandon them as they found the concept of kaiju movies had played out. However, Abrams also suggested that he had thought of something that if they are lucky enough to get it made "could be really cool that [it] connects some stories" in a future film, teasing a larger Cloverfield universe. Interviews with Dan Trachtenberg and Mary Elizabeth Winstead, director and actress of 10 Cloverfield Lane, respectively, confirmed that the movie is and always was intended to be an expansion of the first film, with Trachtenberg calling it the "Cloververse".

In October 2016, it was reported that an Abrams-produced project, tentatively titled God Particle, would be the next film set in the Cloverfield universe. The sequel was originally announced as a February 2017 release but the release date was pushed back to the following year, with the God Particle title having been dropped and the film now being referred to as Untitled Cloverfield Sequel. It has also been suggested that the original plot device of a god particle may have been completely removed from the script. On February 4, 2018, during Super Bowl LII, a TV commercial aired announcing the film would be entitled The Cloverfield Paradox and would have a surprise release on Netflix after the game.

In an April 2018 conference at CinemaCon, Abrams stated that "we're actually developing a true, dedicated Cloverfield sequel." He also said that the sequel would be released theatrically, a departure from the previous installment, The Cloverfield Paradox, which was only released on Netflix. Abrams went on to say that the Cloverfield sequel is coming "very soon."

In January 2021, it was announced that Joe Barton was selected to write the script for a new Cloverfield film, a direct sequel to the 2008 film, produced by Abrams. In September 2022, Babak Anvari was attached to direct the film. In March 2025, Anvari revealed that the sequel is still in development.
