= Cloverfield (franchise) =

American science fiction film series

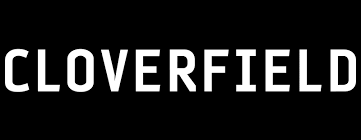
- Official franchise logo
- Created by: J. J. Abrams & Drew Goddard
- Original work: Cloverfield (2008)
- Owners: Paramount Pictures; Bad Robot Productions
- Years: 2008–present

Print publications
- Comics: Cloverfield/Kishin (2008)

Films and television
- Films: Cloverfield (2008); 10 Cloverfield Lane (2016); The Cloverfield Paradox (2018)

Cloverfield is an American science fiction anthology film series and media franchise created and produced by J. J. Abrams consisting of three films, viral marketing websites linking the films together, and a tie-in manga to the first film titled Cloverfield/Kishin (2008), all set in a shared fictional universe referred to as the "Cloververse".

The franchise deals with creatures from other dimensions attacking Earth in various decades, all as a repercussion of an experiment by an astronaut team aboard the outer-space Cloverfield Station in the near-future. Each film depicts the reality-altering effects of their study, which was meant to find a new energy source replacing the planet's depleted resources, only to open portals for assault from various beasts from deep space. All three installments are standalone in nature, though they connect through the Cloverfield story thread. A direct sequel to the first film was announced to be in development in early 2021.

== Films ==
=== Cloverfield (2008) ===
The first film of the series, released in 2008, is a found-footage monster horror film directed by Matt Reeves, produced by J. J. Abrams and Bryan Burk, and written by Drew Goddard. Before settling on an official title, the film was marketed as 01-18-08. The film, which is presented as found footage shot with a home camcorder, follows six people fleeing from a gigantic monster that attacks New York City while they are having a farewell party. The film was well received by critics and grossed over $170 million at the box office against a $25 million budget. Cloverfield was first publicized with a two-minute teaser trailer that did not advertise the film's title, only its release date: 01-18-08 (referring to January 18, 2008). Elements of the viral marketing campaign included MySpace pages created for fictional characters, unusually intense secrecy over the film's plot, and websites created for fictional companies alluded to in the film.

=== 10 Cloverfield Lane (2016) ===
The second film, released in 2016, is a psychological horror film with science fiction elements directed by Dan Trachtenberg, produced by Abrams and Lindsey Weber, and written by Josh Campbell, Matt Stuecken, and Damien Chazelle. The film was developed from a script titled The Cellar, but under production by Bad Robot it was ultimately adapted to be set in the same universe as the first Cloverfield film, thus establishing the grounds for a franchise.

The film follows a young woman in rural Louisiana, who is held in an underground bunker with two men who insist that a hostile event has left the surface of the Earth uninhabitable. The film presents the questionable truth of such statements made by the owner of the bunker. The film is presented in a typical third-person narrative, in contrast to its predecessor's found footage style. Critical response was largely positive, and the film grossed over $110 million against a $15 million budget.

=== The Cloverfield Paradox (2018) ===
The third film, released in 2018 on Netflix, is a science fiction horror film directed by Julius Onah, produced by Abrams and Weber, and written by Oren Uziel and Doug Jung. It is based on Uziel's original spec script God Particle which, like 10 Cloverfield Lane, was initially unconnected to the Cloverfield title. Set in 2028, the film follows a team of astronauts who are left stranded in space after they perform a particle accelerator test that causes their vessel, the Cloverfield Station, to travel into an alternate universe, from which they must find their way back. Meanwhile, the test causes other realities to open up on their home Earth, creating supernatural attacks across parallel universes. After the script was purchased by Paramount and Bad Robot, Abrams saw ways to adapt the film to be a centerpiece of the Cloverfield franchise; with the particle accelerator accident, he liked "how something in the future could be an origin for something in the past" to explain the events of the previous films and set up for additional narratives.

By December 2016, Paramount Pictures removed God Particle from its schedule, and in its place a Cloverfield IMAX Film was added, to be released on February 2, 2018. On January 2, 2018, the film's release date was pushed back to April 20, 2018. At that time, the film's title was rumored to be Cloverfield Station. On February 4, 2018, during Super Bowl LII, a TV spot was shown announcing the film's title, The Cloverfield Paradox, followed by a surprise release of the film on Netflix after the game. The film received mostly negative critical reception. Paramount executives stated that handing off the release to Netflix was an easy way to get instant return on the film, and the surprise reveal and release a good way to keep in line with the "mystique" of the franchise. That said, they stated that there would still be theatrical releases for future films in the series.

=== Future ===
In March 2016, franchise creator and producer J. J. Abrams announced having plans in place for the future of the Cloverfield franchise, stating it "could be [something] really cool that connects some stories". Trachtenberg stated that developments for both a sequel to 10 Cloverfield Lane, or another standalone Cloverfield movie are being discussed. In February 2018, Abrams acknowledged potential for character crossovers in future films. The producer confirmed plans for an eventual team-up with Michelle and Ava, the two characters respectively played by Mary Elizabeth Winstead and Gugu Mbatha-Raw.

In April 2018, it was revealed that A Quiet Place was developed as a potential fourth film in the franchise, but Paramount and its respective screenwriters decided that it would work better as a standalone film. In June 2018, Abrams confirmed that a fourth Cloverfield film would be made and was in development. He further described the film as a "true" and "dedicated" theatrical release sequel to the first film. In January 2021, Joe Barton was hired as screenwriter, while Abrams will serve as co-producer with Hannah Minghella. The project will be a joint-venture production between Bad Robot and Paramount Pictures. Unlike the original film, it will not be filmed in found-footage format.

In September 2022, Babak Anvari signed onto the project as director, who will direct the script written by Barton, while Jon Cohen will act as an additional producer. In January 2023, Matt Reeves stated that the ongoing developments won't be talked about prior to future project releases, with intent for it to "always [be] surprising" similar to the previous installments.

Film	U.S. release date	Director	Screenwriter(s)	Story by	Producers
Cloverfield	January 18, 2008	Matt Reeves	Drew Goddard	Drew Goddard	Bryan Burk & J. J. Abrams
10 Cloverfield Lane	March 11, 2016	Dan Trachtenberg	Josh Campbell, Matt Stuecken & Damien Chazelle	Josh Campbell & Matt Stuecken	J. J. Abrams & Lindsey Weber
The Cloverfield Paradox	February 4, 2018	Julius Onah	Oren Uziel	Doug Jung & Oren Uziel	J. J. Abrams & Lindsey Weber
Untitled fourth Cloverfield film	TBA	Babak Anvari	Joe Barton	Joe Barton	Jon Cohen, J. J. Abrams & Hannah Minghella

== Manga ==
Cloverfield/Kishin (クローバーフィールド/KISHIN, Kurōbāfīrudo/KISHIN) is a manga and cross-media tie-in to the first film. It was published once a month on Kadokawa Shoten's website and consists of four chapters from January to May 2008.

Title	Publication date(s)	Writer(s)	Illustrator(s)	Note
Cloverfield/Kishin	January to May 2008	Matthew Pitts, David Baronoff & Nicole Phillips	Yoshiki Togawa	Tie-in parallel prequel/sequel manga to Cloverfield

== Cast and characters ==
=== Overview ===
List indicators

This section includes characters who have appeared in the franchise.

- An empty grey cell indicates the character was not in the film.
- ^{C} indicates a cameo role.
- ^{V} indicates a voice-only role.

Characters	Films			Manga	ARG campaigns		
Characters	Cloverfield	10 Cloverfield Lane	The Cloverfield Paradox	Cloverfield/Kishin	Cloverfield	10 Cloverfield Lane	The Cloverfield Paradox
Characters	2008	2016	2018	2008		2016	2018
Clover Large-scale aggressor	Appeared		Appeared	Appeared	Appeared		Appeared
Clover Large-scale aggressor	Conceived by J. J. Abrams Designed by Neville Page		Conceived by J. J. Abrams Designed by Neville Page	Conceived by J. J. Abrams Designed by Neville Page	Conceived by J. J. Abrams Designed by Neville Page		Conceived by J. J. Abrams Designed by Neville Page
Rob Hawkins	Michael Stahl-David				Michael Stahl-David		
Elizabeth "Beth" McIntyre	Odette Annable				Odette Annable		
Hud Platt	T.J. Miller				T.J. Miller		
Lily Ford	Jessica Lucas				Jessica Lucas		
Marlena Diamond	Lizzy Caplan				Lizzy Caplan		
Jason "Hawk" Hawkins	Mike Vogel				Mike Vogel		
Jamie Lascano	Jamie Harlan				Jamie Harlan		
Howard Stambler Radioman70		John Goodman				John Goodman	
Michelle		Mary Elizabeth Winstead					
Emmett DeWitt		John Gallagher Jr.					
Leslie Newscaster		Suzanne Cryer^{C}	Suzanne Cryer^{C}				
Ben		Bradley Cooper^{V}					
Kiel			David Oyelowo				David Oyelowo
Mark Stambler			Donal Logue				Donal Logue
Ava Hamilton			Gugu Mbatha-Raw				
Ernst Schmidt			Daniel Brühl				
Monk Acosta			John Ortiz				
Mundy			Chris O'Dowd				
Volkov			Aksel Hennie				
Tam			Zhang Ziyi				
Mina Jensen			Elizabeth Debicki				
Michael			Roger Davies				
Molly			Clover Nee				

=== Cloverfield ===
Clover is the production name given to the giant monster that attacks New York the same night the main characters throw a going-away party for their friend Rob. Clover is the main antagonist of the film. Various members of the filmmaking crew referred to the monster as "Clover" throughout the special features of the Cloverfield DVD. Additionally, actor Michael Stahl-David reported that the monster was referred to as "Clover" prior to the movie's release.

While rescuing Beth, Hud gives various theories on where the monster may have come from — which included being from the ocean, from outer space, or created by the government. The monster kills Jason when it smashes the Brooklyn Bridge with its tail and later kills Hud by biting him in half. The parasites that drop off its body during its rampage also bite Marlena, who later dies gruesomely as a result.

According to the tie-in manga Cloverfield/Kishin, and hinted at slightly by the viral marketing websites, a Japanese oil-drilling company known as Tagruato (of which Slusho!, where Rob was supposed to work, is a subsidiary company) captured the monster for unknown reasons. In the manga, the monster has some kind of biological connection to Kishin Aiba, the main character, due to a result of tampering or experimentation. Kishin Aiba is able to control the monster without it harming him.

Marlena Diamond (played by Lizzy Caplan), 26, is good friends with Lily. During Rob's going-away party, she is seen mostly avoiding Hud during the party while he tries unsuccessfully to flirt with her. She is bitten and killed by one of the monster's parasites.

Despite not being told the premise of the film initially, Lizzy Caplan stated that she accepted a role in Cloverfield solely because she was a fan of the Abrams-produced television series Lost (in which her former Related co-star Kiele Sanchez was a recurring character), and her experience of discovering its true nature eventually caused her to state that she would not sign on for a film in the future "without knowing full well what it is." She indicated that her character was a "sarcastic outsider," and that her role was "physically demanding."

Lily Ford (played by Jessica Lucas), 27, is friends of Beth and Marlena and the girlfriend of Jason. In the film, she suggested to Jason that they should throw a farewell party for his brother, Rob, before his departure to Japan to accept a new job. During the evacuation of Manhattan, Lily is put on a different helicopter from the rest of the group, but her overall fate is left unknown.

Hud Platt (played by T. J. Miller), 27, was Rob's best friend and inadvertently filmed nearly the entire attack by the monster. Hud, much like T. J. Miller in real life, is the comedian of the group, and often provides comic relief throughout most of the film. During the evacuation of Manhattan, the monster attacks the helicopter he, Beth and Rob were in, causing it to crash. The next morning, he is killed by the monster.

Hud himself was also originally to have survived, but producer J. J. Abrams suggested having him getting eaten by the monster, allowing the audience to vicariously experience this. The scene was then planned as having Hud be eaten instantly after turning around, but it was decided that the audience deserved a clearer look at the monster, which resulted in the longer shot with the monster leaning down to inspect Hud before biting and killing him. According to the "Special Investigation Mode" on the Cloverfield Blu-ray release, Hud was "posthumously awarded for his brave work in documenting and providing the Department with rare close-up details of Cloverfield events."

Rob Hawkins (played by Michael Stahl-David), 27, is the protagonist of the film. During the evacuation of Manhattan, the monster attacks the helicopter he, Beth and Hud are in, causing it to crash. His ultimate fate is unknown. Stahl-David reprises his role in the fan-made short film, The Cloverfield Files, in which he is revealed to have become vice-president of Tagruato.

Jason Hawkins (played by Mike Vogel), 28, is Rob's older brother and boyfriend of Lily. He is killed when the monster attacks the Brooklyn Bridge during the evacuation of Manhattan.

Beth McIntyre (played by Odette Annable), 23, is the long-time platonic friend of Rob Hawkins. After a heated argument between Beth and Rob during his farewell party, she and a friend Travis leave the party. Upon the monster's arrival, however, she becomes trapped in her father's apartment during the onslaught. After Rob, Hudson, and Lily rescue her, she, along with Rob and Hud, board a helicopter that is treated to a bird's eye view of the assault on the monster, but is attacked in the process. She survives the monster attack and crash. After the death of Hud, she and Rob take cover under a nearby bridge and make a final recording, professing their love towards each other and letting whoever watches the video know who they are, and what happened. The bridge is then destroyed by the bombs used in the attempt to kill the monster. Her ultimate fate is unknown.

Ganu Yoshida is the C.E.O. of Tagruato. He is attacked in New York City by a group that he suspects is T.I.D.O. Wave weeks after the Chuai Station sinks in the Atlantic and just before the monster attacks.

Jenn and Antonio (played by Margot Farley and Theo Rossi) are close friends of Rob Hawkins. Jenn and her boyfriend Antonio are seen frequently through the party, showing that both are close friends with Hud as well. They are both last seen in the streets soon after Jason makes the decision to cross the Brooklyn Bridge from Manhattan. Their ultimate fate remains unknown.

Charlie (played by Brian Klugman) first appears prominently in the teaser trailer; towards the beginning of the trailer he directs the comment "You owe me eleven dollars," to Rob. Charlie again appears at the very end of the trailer, stating "This is going to be the best night ever!" which is not seen in the film. He also appears in the extended theatrical trailer, though briefly, and is only visible during the short party scene at the beginning. He is not seen again for the rest of the film and his ultimate fate is unknown.

Travis Marello (played by Ben Feldman) is Beth's new boyfriend. He is seen in the party with Beth, which upsets Rob. According to the Special Investigation Mode on the Cloverfield Blu-ray release, Travis drives home to New Jersey before the end of the party and thus survives the attack.

Sergeant Pryce helps the group by allowing them to go search for Beth and afterwards escorting them to a chopper. He is last seen entering a departing Humvee as the monster attacks the evacuation site. His fate is unknown.

Heather (played by Liza Lapira) is a girl at the party and a close friend of Lily. She is seen multiple times during the party. Heather is then seen in the streets as the monster rampages where Rob, Hud, Lily, Marlena, Jason and the other party guests, and onlookers are standing watching the destruction. Her ultimate fate is unknown.

=== Cloverfield/Kishin ===
- Kishin Aiba is a troubled boy who had been repeatedly tormented by a couple of bullies in a public restroom within their school. Although he is saved from humiliation by a girl named Aiko Sasahara, they continue their activities with him and decide to leave him within the confines of an emergency safety house. He has a long history of being bullied due to his mother being "strange", and along with her, he is badly ridiculed. When his mother died, he was so stricken with grief that even into his teens, he wished he had died with her. His emotional torment continues, while at the same time the monster begins to surface within Tagruato's oceans. He later escapes the school grounds with Aiko's help after seeing news coverage about the monster. Here, the two bond together while on their way to Kishin's apartment to seek shelter, only to stumble across an unknown cult bent on using him for a dark purpose tied to the monster.

As shown in some panels, Kishin and his father are not on good terms. Medical records seen in his father's room, along with the cult tracking him down, heavily imply that Kishin is part of a series of experiments with an item revered by the cult, which ties him to the monster, itself. In the third chapter, it is seen that his system has been mixed with the monster's in a tiny organ called the Splinter of Amnion, which allows him to control it without falling victim to its wrath. Kishin's father confirms this as an act of sabotage by his mother, who uses Kishin as a vessel under the cult's orders, but dies by Tagruato's hands.

Kishin succumbs to madness due to the betrayal of his mother, and now uses the monster to cause more destruction. He is able to control the monster without it harming him, it thinking him its kin or brethren. In the final chapter, with the help of Aiko, Kishin regains his sanity and learns to value his life and the lives of others. He faces the monster, whereupon it moves the Splinter of Amnion from his system to its own. But as it cannot feed on the emotions Kishin has laced it with, it leaves Kishin in the seas of Japan, where he is rescued by Aiko and the bullies. The manga ends as they embrace, Kishin having finally found the one thing he cares for in his life.

- Yoko Aiba is Kishin's mother. In the manga she is ostracized by both children and adults because of her eccentric nature. It is later revealed that she is part of the cult that worships the monster. She is deeply attached to her son, and comforts him during troubled times. She cares little for her own wellbeing so long as her son believes in her. She dies having been targeted by Tagruato, leaving her son alone and in emotional pain for most of his life. During her time with Kishin's father, she obtains a biological device and places it inside Kishin, giving him the ability to control the monster.
- Aiko Sasahara is Kishin Aiba's classmate. She keeps an uptight attitude but is optimistic despite her troubled past with her parents. Her father has died two years prior to the story and her mother is an abusive drunk who exploits her husband's finances over their daughter's well-being. She is determined to live life on her own terms. She has a deep fear of rodents/mice. She and Kishin are fans of one of the popstars promoting Tagruato's product Slusho! named Yuki. Aiko's role is greatly expanded in the final chapter, wherein she helps bring Kishin's sanity back by confessing her feelings to him. She escapes the school with Kishin after hearing a report about the monster's rampage on the coastline of Japan, and bonds with Kishin. They arrive at Kishin's residence where two unknown men from a cult come looking for him. She tries to seek help but to no avail, and is instead escorted to a shelter by the cult's underlings. However, her mind is still set on saving Kishin. She is thrown out of the shelter by the very same group that bullies Kishin. Unlike Kishin, she has some physical prowess and is able to defeat the monster's parasites without bites or injuries. Fighting off the monster's parasites, she comes upon Kishin and the monster causing destruction in Japan. She, Kishin and the bullies hold off the parasites while Kishin leaves to deal with the monster. The monster, unable to feed on the stimuli of Kishin's emotions due to his love for Aiko, leaves him in the sea of Japan. Aiko and the bullies rescue him as the monster retreats back into the ocean. The manga ends with Kishin and Aiko embracing in the wake of the disaster.
- Kurosaki is a sailor who unknowingly escorts the monster in one of Tagruato's ships. He is a father-to-be and loves to show off pictures of his wife and unborn child to his fellow unit, much to their chagrin, and longs to return home and see his family again. When the monster escapes Tagruato's grasp, he and his unit attempt to fight off the beast while waiting for backup; they fail miserably. He gives his last transmission calling for an airstrike, and laments his death while musing at his wife's picture before the monster claws its way through the ship's hull, devouring him. Before his death, it was heavily implied that he and his unit did not know of the monster's existence until the attack, despite having been briefed about the classified mission.
- Mr. Aiba is Kishin's father. He is revealed to be head of Tagruato's research, and has connections to the Slusho! drink. He is callous and cares little for his son, and therefore the two are not on good terms. He saves Kishin from the cult and reveals to Kishin his true purpose and his tie to the monster, but attempts to destroy him before the monster can get to Kishin. He fails as the monster shields Kishin from harm. Mr. Aiba is the researcher and developer of the Splinter of Amnion, a biological orb that controls the monster.
- Three unnamed individuals bully Kishin because of his mother's eccentricity. They take deep pleasure in tormenting Kishin throughout the manga. Kishin, with the help of Aiko, evades them on the second chapter. They are seen again in the shelter where the parasites rush into the city and purge its citizens. They play a large role in the final chapter with Kishin and Aiko, when one begs to be spared and is saved only by Aiko's intervention. With Aiko's help, they hold the parasites off until Kishin stops the monster.
- Yuki is a famous popstar in the Cloverfield universe. He is first introduced in the second chapter promoting the Slusho! drink. Aiko Sasahara admires Yuki's performances and is surprised that Kishin has some connections to him.
- The Cult are a mysterious group of fanatics who abduct Kishin, wishing to use him in some unknown experiments. Their goal is to make Kishin a vessel for controlling the monster to purify Japan, which they believe has been tainted by human society. They also worship the creature itself, implying that they have known of its existence long before Tagruato or the Japanese government. Most are killed by Kishin's father. Kishin's mother is affiliated with the cult prior to conceiving her son, having entered a relationship with one of Tagruato's staff.

=== 10 Cloverfield Lane ===
- Michelle (played by Mary Elizabeth Winstead) is a young woman who leaves New Orleans and drives through rural Louisiana after an argument with her fiancé, Ben, that ends with her ending their relationship. Late at night, she turns on the radio and hears of continuous blackouts in major cities. Distracted by a call from Ben, Michelle gets into an accident and is rendered unconscious. She wakes up in a concrete room chained to a wall, and is approached by a man named Howard, who explains that an unknown attack has taken place and that he brought her to his bunker after finding her on the side of the road. Michelle struggles with accepting the idea that some type of war has left the Earth uninhabitable, and fights to know the truth about what is really going on.
- Howard Stambler (played by John Goodman) is a former US Navy sailor turned survivalist who brings Michelle to an underground bunker following her car accident. He explains that he has saved her from an unknown attack that has taken place and that left the surface uninhabitable. Michelle doubts his motives and his story about what is occurring on the surface. Stambler is later shown to be mentally unstable, and kills Emmett. During Michelle's escape attempt she kicks over a barrel of perchloric acid, which causes an electrical fire that kills Stambler. A viral marketing site used to promote the film states that Howard was Tagruato Corporation's Employee of the Month in February 2016.
- Emmett DeWitt (played by John Gallagher Jr.) is another survivor who witnessed the attack and fled to Howard's bunker. He helped build the bunker for Howard and confirms to Michelle that something dangerous and deadly is taking place at the surface. Howard later shoots Emmett in the face for wanting to construct a weapon, though Emmett was really covering for Michelle. Michelle later finds his corpse dissolving in perchloric acid.
- Ben (voiced by Bradley Cooper) is Michelle's ex-fiancé. Michelle abruptly breaks up with Ben at the start of the film after an argument and leaves town, leading to her car accident and her connection with Howard.
- Leslie (played by Suzanne Cryer) is Howard's neighbour who begs to be let into the bunker when Michelle is trying to escape. Noticing that Leslie is suffering from severe skin lesions, Michelle realizes the air may not be safe, and refuses to open the door. Leslie dies.

=== The Cloverfield Paradox ===
- Ava Hamilton (played by Gugu Mbatha-Raw) is a British communications officer aboard Cloverfield Station and Michael's wife. Losing her children to a fire that she inadvertently caused, she deals with grief from the loss with her husband, but ultimately goes aboard the Cloverfield Station.
- Jason Kiel (played by David Oyelowo) is an American commander of the station.
- Ernst Schmidt (played by Daniel Brühl) is a German physicist of the station.
- Monk Acosta (played by John Ortiz) is a Brazilian doctor of the station.
- Gordon Mundy (played by Chris O'Dowd) is an Irish engineer of the station.
- Sasha Volkov (played by Aksel Hennie) is a Russian engineer of the station.
- Ling Tam (played by Zhang Ziyi) is a Chinese engineer of the station.
- Mina Jensen (played by Elizabeth Debicki) is an Australian engineer from an alternate timeline.
- Michael Hamilton (played by Roger Davies) is the husband of Ava. He has a sub-plot, in which he finds and tries to help a young girl.

== Additional crew and production details ==
Title	Crew/Detail					
Title	Composer	Cinematographer	Editor(s)	Production companies	Distributing company	Running time
Cloverfield	Michael Giacchino	Michael Bonvillain	Kevin Stitt	Paramount Pictures; Bad Robot	Paramount Pictures	85 min
10 Cloverfield Lane	Bear McCreary	Jeff Cutter	Stefan Grube	Paramount Pictures; Bad Robot	Paramount Pictures	104 min
The Cloverfield Paradox	Bear McCreary	Dan Mindel	Matt Evans, Rebecca Valente & Alan Baumgarten	Paramount Pictures; Netflix Original Films; Bad Robot	Netflix	102 min
Untitled fourth Cloverfield film	TBA	TBA	TBA	Paramount Pictures; Bad Robot	Paramount Pictures	TBA

== Reception ==
=== Box office performance ===
Film	U.S. release date	Box office gross			All-time ranking		Budget	Ref.
Film	U.S. release date	U.S. and Canada	Other territories	Worldwide	U.S. and Canada	Worldwide	Budget	Ref.
Cloverfield	January 18, 2008	$80,048,433	$90,715,593	$170,764,026	1,019	1,017	$25 million	
10 Cloverfield Lane	March 11, 2016	$72,082,998	$38,134,000	$110,216,998	1,149	1,582	$15 million	
Total		$152,131,431	$128,849,593	$280,981,024	246	264	$40 million	

=== Critical response ===
Film	Critical		Public
Film	Rotten Tomatoes	Metacritic	CinemaScore
Cloverfield	78% (215 reviews)	64 (37 reviews)	C
10 Cloverfield Lane	91% (316 reviews)	76 (43 reviews)	B-
The Cloverfield Paradox	21% (154 reviews)	37 (27 reviews)	—N/a

== Related films ==
While some observers noted a similarity between the alien featured in Super 8 (2011) and the monster in Cloverfield, J. J. Abrams stated during an interview with MTV that the only connection between them is that they were both designed by Neville Page.

Writers Scott Beck and Bryan Woods revealed that they considered pitching A Quiet Place (2018) as a movie taking place within the Cloverfield universe. In an interview with Ben Pearson for /Film, Beck revealed it was Paramount Pictures that nixed the idea:

It was weird timing, though, because when we were writing the script, 10 Cloverfield Lane was at Paramount. We were actually talking to an executive there about this film, and it felt from pitch form that there might be crossover, but when we finally took the final script in to Paramount, they saw it as a totally different movie. What was really incredible about the process that we feel very grateful for is the studio embraced this weird movie with no dialogue with open arms. They never thought about branding it as a Cloverfield film, I think in part because conceptually it was able to stand on its own.

Although the 2018 film Overlord was initially reported to be the fourth film in the series during its production, Abrams eventually announced the film to be a standalone release.

In October 2019, T.J. Miller stated on Instagram that the then-upcoming film Underwater (2020), also featuring 10 Cloverfield Lane star John Gallagher Jr., had connections to the Cloververse, though both actors would be portraying different characters than they previously portrayed in the franchise. However, the released version of the film contained no overt references to the Cloverfield franchise.
