= 10 Cloverfield Lane =

2016 film by Dan Trachtenberg

- Theatrical release poster
- Directed by: Dan Trachtenberg
- Screenplay by: Josh Campbell; Matt Stuecken; Damien Chazelle
- Story by: Josh Campbell; Matt Stuecken
- Produced by: J. J. Abrams; Lindsey Weber
- Starring: John Goodman; Mary Elizabeth Winstead; John Gallagher Jr.
- Cinematography: Jeff Cutter
- Edited by: Stefan Grube
- Music by: Bear McCreary
- Production company: Bad Robot
- Distributed by: Paramount Pictures
- Release dates: March 8, 2016 (New York City); March 11, 2016 (United States)
- Running time: 104 minutes
- Country: United States
- Language: English
- Budget: $15 million
- Box office: $110.2 million

10 Cloverfield Lane is a 2016 American science fiction thriller film directed by Dan Trachtenberg in his directorial debut, produced by J. J. Abrams and Lindsey Weber and written by Josh Campbell, Matthew Stuecken, and Damien Chazelle. The second film in the Cloverfield franchise, it stars Mary Elizabeth Winstead, John Goodman, and John Gallagher Jr. The story follows a young woman who, after a car crash, wakes up in an underground bunker with two men who insist that an event has left the surface of Earth uninhabitable.

The film was developed from a script titled The Cellar; but under production by Bad Robot, it was turned into a standalone sequel to the 2008 film Cloverfield. It is presented in a third-person narrative, in contrast to its predecessor's found-footage style. Principal photography took place under the title Valencia in New Orleans, Louisiana, from October 20 to December 15, 2014.

10 Cloverfield Lane premiered in New York City on March 8, 2016, and was released in select countries on March 10. It was released in the United States on March 11, 2016, in both conventional and IMAX formats. The film received positive reviews and grossed over $110 million worldwide. A successor, The Cloverfield Paradox, was released on February 4, 2018.

== Plot ==
After an argument with her fiancé, a young woman named Michelle leaves her New Orleans apartment. That night, while driving through rural Louisiana, she hears news reports of blackouts in several major cities. Suddenly, her car is struck off the road, knocking her unconscious. Awakening with an injured leg, Michelle finds that she is chained in a bunker. Her captor, an older man named Howard, unchains her. He explains that he took her to the bunker to save her life and claims that the air outside is poisoned after an attack.

Howard gives Michelle a tour of his bunker, introducing her to Emmett, his construction assistant. Through a viewport at the airlock, Howard shows her two decayed pigs outside, supposedly killed in the attack. Michelle also sees Howard's truck and recalls it striking her car. She privately talks to Emmett, who assures her that the attack is real: he begged to be let in after witnessing the attack.

During dinner, Howard shows flashes of jealousy when Michelle grows closer to Emmett. Michelle steals Howard's keychain and flees. At the airlock, she prepares to open the outside door when she witnesses a woman covered with lesions screaming to be let in before dying. Michelle retreats to the bunker, and Howard explains that he accidentally struck her car while rushing to the bunker. Michelle is seemingly convinced.

Over the next few days, the trio begins to adapt to life underground, and Howard opens up about his daughter, showing Michelle a photo. After something loud passes overhead, the air ventilation system fails. Howard sends Michelle through a small duct to reactivate it. In the control room, she finds a padlocked skylight with the word "HELP" scratched on the inside, and an earring she saw in the photo. Michelle shares this with Emmett, who recognizes the girl as a local who disappeared two years earlier; Howard's actual daughter left with his wife. Deciding to escape, Michelle fashions a makeshift hazmat suit by stealing Howard's supplies and tools.

Howard discovers their plot and threatens to immerse them both in perchloric acid. When Emmett claims responsibility, Howard shoots and kills him. He tells a shocked Michelle that now they can be a family of two. While Howard cleans up, Michelle secretly finishes the suit. When discovered, Michelle flees, overturning a barrel of acid. The corrosive puddle disfigures Howard and starts a fire. Leaving Howard to his fate, Michelle dons the suit and escapes.

Outside, Michelle sees an approaching large biomechanical alien craft, attracted by the bunker fire. It drops a Human Scale Parasite that investigates the car alarm and tries unsuccessfully to get at Michelle. The craft discharges a green gas, which she protects herself from by restoring her hazmat mask and suit, and takes shelter in Howard's truck. The large craft's tentacles lift the truck to get to Michelle, but she destroys it with a makeshift Molotov cocktail she makes with a half filled liquor bottle left-over in the truck. She then escapes and drives away in the dead woman's car.

On the car radio, Michelle hears an emergency broadcast about random successes in the battle with the invading aliens. It mentions that a safe zone has been set up in Baton Rouge, but when she arrives at a crossroads, she decides to head for Houston, where help is requested from people with medical or combat training. Two approaching massive alien craft are revealed in the lightning of the distant stormy sky.

== Cast ==
- John Goodman as Howard
- Mary Elizabeth Winstead as Michelle
- John Gallagher Jr. as Emmett

In addition, Suzanne Cryer has a cameo appearance as the woman trying to enter the bunker, while Bradley Cooper has a voice cameo as Michelle's fiancé, Ben.

== Production ==
=== Development ===
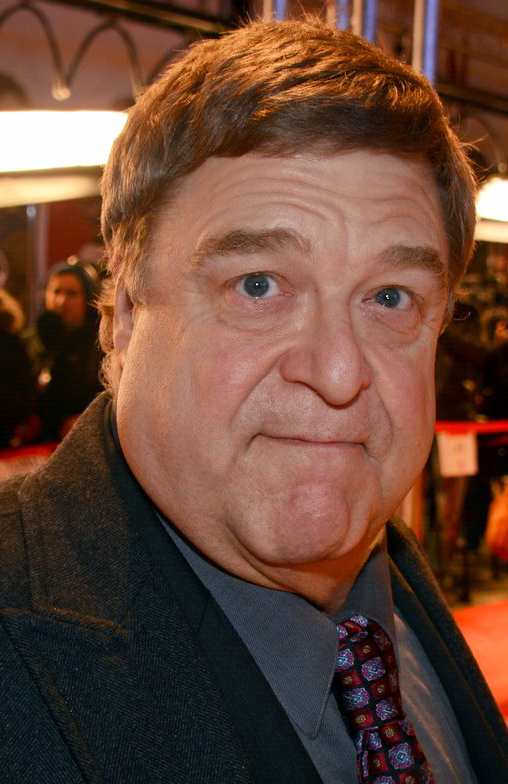
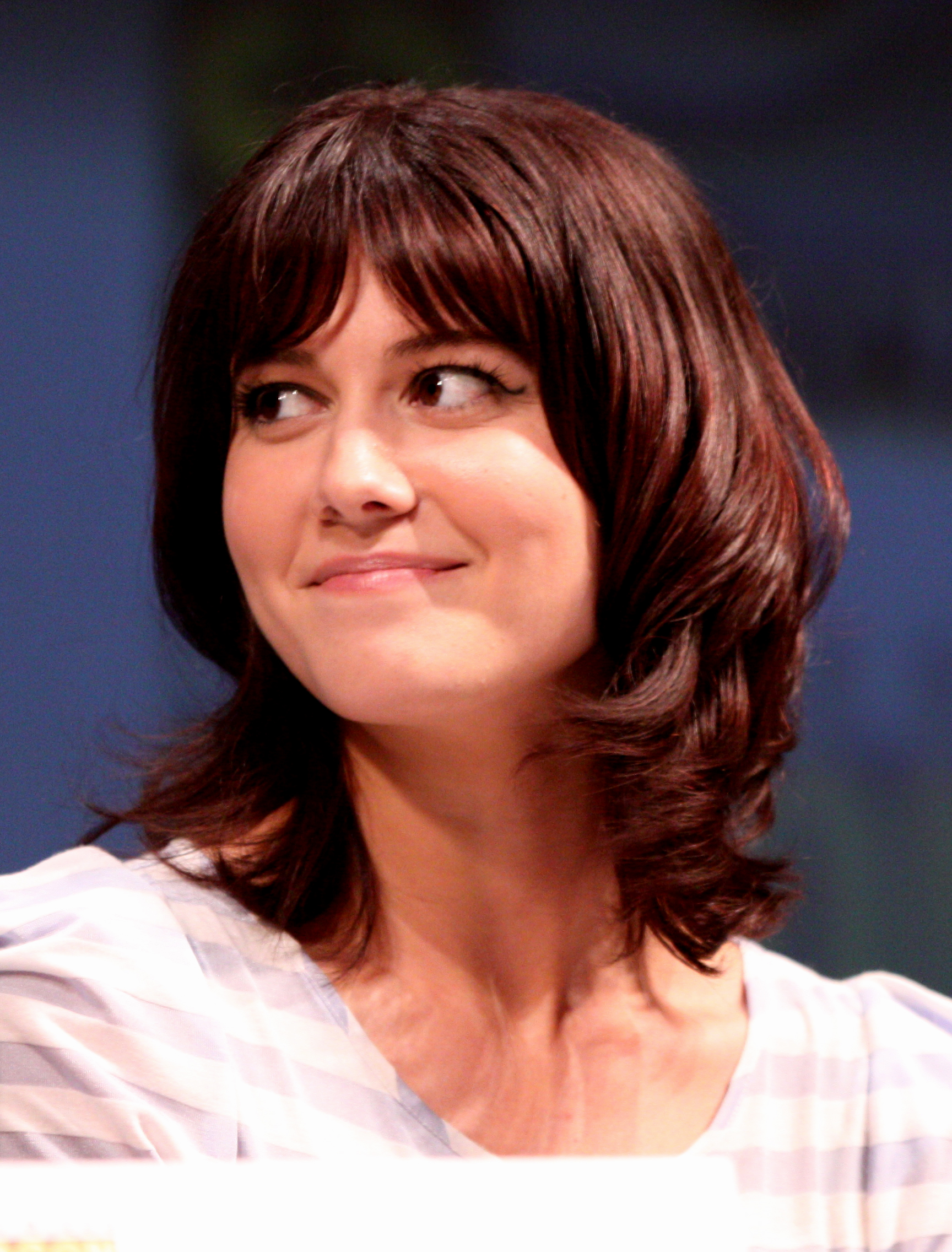
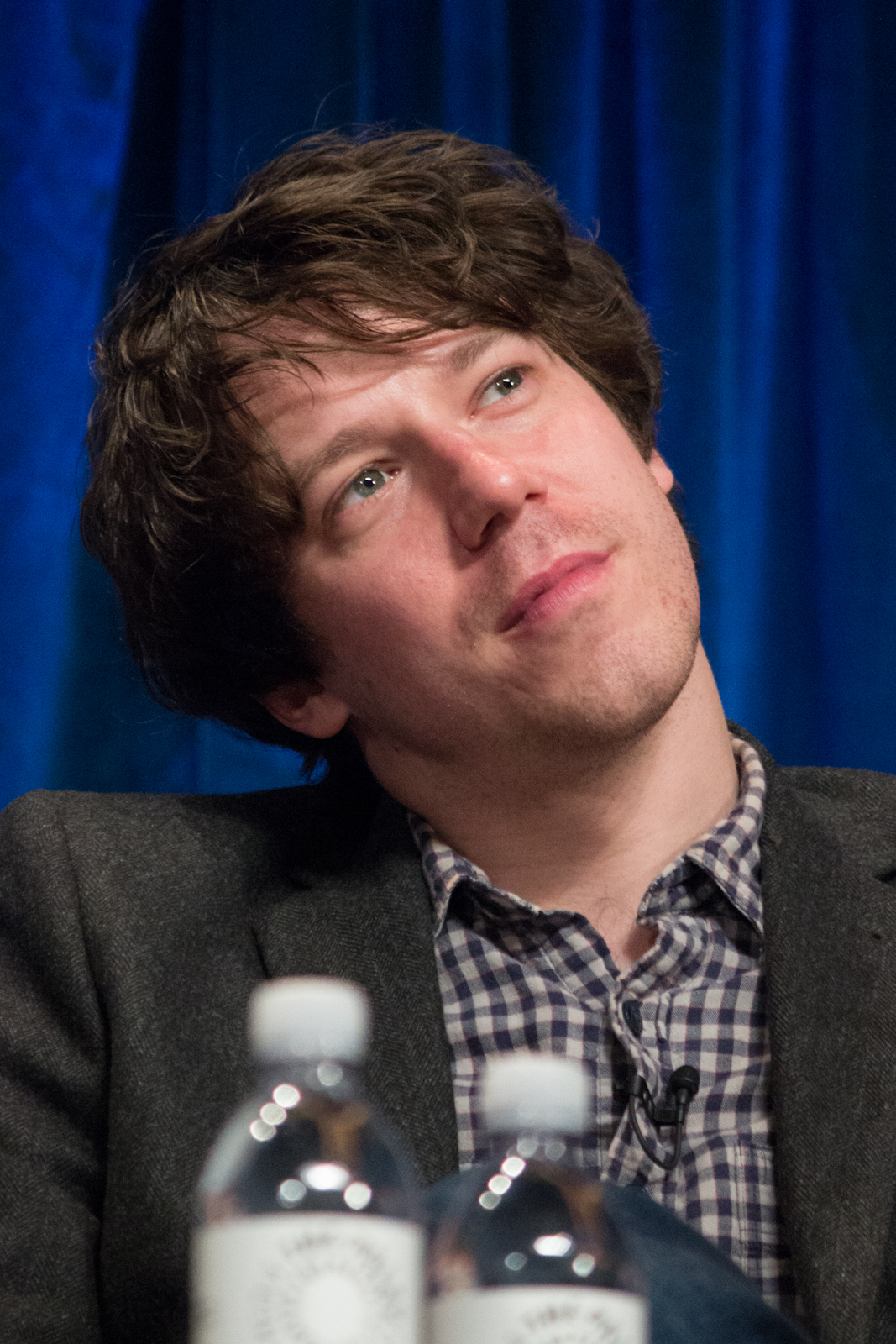
John Goodman, Mary Elizabeth Winstead and John Gallagher Jr.

10 Cloverfield Lane originated from an "ultra low budget" spec script penned by Josh Campbell and Matt Stuecken, titled The Cellar. The Tracking Board included the script in "The Hit List" of 2012 – an annually published list of spec scripts written within the year that have impressed its voting members. In 2012, Paramount Pictures bought the script and commenced further development under Bad Robot for Insurge Pictures, Paramount's specialty label for films with a micro-budget. When Bad Robot became involved, the film was assigned the codename Valencia to keep exact details of the production a secret.

Damien Chazelle was brought in to rewrite Campbell and Stuecken's draft and direct the film. Chazelle dropped out from directing when his Whiplash project received funding. On April 3, 2014, it was reported production for Valencia was greenlit to begin in the fall of 2014, under the direction of Dan Trachtenberg with the latest draft being written by an uncredited Daniel Casey. A budget of about $5 million was reported to be expected, in keeping with the mandate of Paramount's Insurge division of producing micro-budgeted films.

On July 8, 2014, Variety reported John Goodman was in negotiations to star in the film. On August 25, 2014, they reported Mary Elizabeth Winstead had entered negotiations, and on September 22, 2014, John Gallagher Jr. reportedly joined the cast.

During production, the filmmakers noticed core similarities to Cloverfield, and decided to make the picture what Abrams calls "a blood relative" or "spiritual successor" of that film, turning it into a standalone sequel in the process. "The spirit of it, the genre of it, the heart of it, the fear factor, the comedy factor, the weirdness factor, there were so many elements that felt like the DNA of this story were of the same place that Cloverfield was born out of", said Abrams. In other interviews he explained: "Those characters and that monster [from Cloverfield] are not in this movie, but there are other characters and other monsters", and "This movie is very purposefully not called Cloverfield 2, because it's not Cloverfield 2, [...] So if you're approaching it as a literal sequel, you'll be surprised to see what this movie is. But while it's not what you might expect from a movie that has the name Cloverfield in it, I think you'll find that you'll understand the connection when you see the whole thing." Winstead and Gallagher mentioned that during production they were aware that the film had thematic similarities to Cloverfield, but did not learn that there would be an official connection until they were informed of the chosen title, only a few days before the release of the trailer. Abrams came up with the title after finishing Star Wars: The Force Awakens (2015).

In a March 2015 interview, a few months after production wrapped, Winstead was asked about her experience during Valencia and described it as a "really contained film", reiterating the premise of The Cellar about a woman being trapped with her mysterious savior in a supposed post-nuclear fallout world. Later in the month, Insurge Pictures was reported to have been dismantled and its staff absorbed by its parent company. Insurge's only film that had yet to be released was reported to be Valencia. Speaking of rewrites that took place during production, Winstead called them "nothing that was major".

During an interview with Abrams to promote 10 Cloverfield Lane, he said the creative team behind the original had some ideas on developing Cloverfield 2, but the release of films such as Godzilla (2014) and Pacific Rim (2013) led them to abandon them as they found the concept of kaiju films played out.

=== Filming ===
Principal photography on the film began on October 20, 2014, in New Orleans, Louisiana. Filming took place in chronological order on only one set. Scenes involving explosions, fire, and smoke were shot in early December 2014 in Hahnville, Louisiana. Filming ended on December 15, 2014.

=== Music ===
Bear McCreary composed the music for the film. The soundtrack was digitally released on March 11, 2016.

== Marketing ==
The film's title was revealed on January 15, 2016, in a trailer attached to 13 Hours: The Secret Soldiers of Benghazi. As with Cloverfield, a viral marketing campaign was used that included elements of an alternate reality game. Bad Robot kick-started the campaign in early February 2016 by updating the Tagruato.jp website used for the original film. The campaign revealed backstory information about the character Howard Stambler and his daughter.

== Release ==
The film was released in select countries on March 10, 2016, in regular and IMAX theaters, before its official release in North America on March 11, also in conventional and IMAX theaters. Those who attended screenings of the film at AMC IMAX theaters were eligible to receive collectible movie posters, which illustrated the three main characters separately. The film was rated PG-13 by the Motion Picture Association of America for "thematic material including frightening sequences of threat with some violence, and brief language".

=== Home media ===
The film was digitally released on May 31, 2016, and on Blu-ray and DVD on June 14.

== Reception ==
=== Box office ===
10 Cloverfield Lane grossed $72.2 million in the United States and $38.1 million in other territories for a worldwide total of $110.2 million.

In the United States and Canada, the film made $1.8 million from its Thursday night previews at 2,500 theaters, and $9 million on its first day (including Thursday previews). In its opening weekend, it earned $24.7 million, finishing in second place at the box office behind Zootopia ($51.3 million), which was in its second weekend.

Outside North America, 10 Cloverfield Lane received a staggered release, across 54 countries. It earned $1.5 million in its opening weekend from six international markets with a bulk of it coming from Australia ($1 million). Overall, the top openings were in the United Kingdom and Ireland ($2.2 million), South Korea ($1.7 million), and France ($1.4 million).

=== Critical response ===
On Rotten Tomatoes, 91% of 316 critic reviews are positive, with an average rating of 7.5/10. The site's critical consensus reads, "Smart, solidly crafted, and palpably tense, 10 Cloverfield Lane makes the most of its confined setting and outstanding cast—and suggests a new frontier for franchise filmmaking." According to Metacritic, which calculated a weighted average score of 76 out of 100 based on 43 critics, the film received "generally favorable" reviews. Audiences polled by CinemaScore gave the film an average grade of "B−" on an A+ to F scale.

Bill Zwecker of the Chicago Sun-Times gave 10 Cloverfield Lane four stars out of four, commending the film as "continually gripping and extremely engrossing ... [Dan Trachtenberg] helmed this film with artistry, imagination and skillful precision." Jeannette Catsoulis of The New York Times praised the cast's performance and Jeff Cutter's cinematography, while writing: "Sneakily tweaking our fears of terrorism, '10 Cloverfield Lane,' though no more than a kissing cousin to its namesake, is smartly chilling and finally spectacular. A sequel is virtually a given."

Alan Scherstuhl of the Village Voice also praised the acting and technical aspects, but wrote that the film "is less compelling in terms of character and meaning." In a mixed review for Slant, Chuck Bowen found a lack of character development between the three leads, and labeled the film's ending as anticlimactic. Bowen also writes: "The film hits its expositional narrative marks and nothing else ... 10 Cloverfield Lane will almost immediately evaporate from the mind, before J.J. Abrams commences in selling you the same thing all over again." Soren Andersen of the Seattle Times, who gave 10 Cloverfield Lane one and half stars out of four, similarly criticized the film's ending, labeling it as "full-bore" and "Too little. Too late." James Verniere of the Boston Herald disapproved of the characters and pacing, and he ultimately described the film as "a crummy, low-rent, intellectually bereft thriller."

=== Accolades ===
Association	Category	Nominee(s)	Result	Ref.
Bram Stoker Awards	Superior Achievement in a Screenplay	Josh Campbell, Damien Chazelle and Matthew Stuecken	Nominated	
Critics' Choice Awards	Best Sci-Fi/Horror Movie	10 Cloverfield Lane	Nominated	
Directors Guild of America Awards	Outstanding Directing – First-Time Feature Film	Dan Trachtenberg	Nominated	
Empire Awards	Best Sci-Fi/Fantasy	10 Cloverfield Lane	Nominated	
Fangoria Chainsaw Awards	Best Film	10 Cloverfield Lane	Nominated	
Fangoria Chainsaw Awards	Best Actor	John Goodman	Won	
Hollywood Music in Media Awards	Best Original Score – Sci-Fi/Fantasy Film	Bear McCreary	Nominated	
IndieWire Critics Poll	Best Supporting Actor	John Goodman	10th Place	
Saturn Awards	Best Thriller Film	10 Cloverfield Lane	Won	
Saturn Awards	Best Actress	Mary Elizabeth Winstead	Won	
Saturn Awards	Best Supporting Actor	John Goodman	Won	
Saturn Awards	Best Editing	Stefan Grube	Nominated	
St. Louis Gateway Film Critics Association	Best Horror/Science-Fiction Film	10 Cloverfield Lane	Nominated	
Teen Choice Awards	Choice Movie: Drama	10 Cloverfield Lane	Nominated	

== Future ==
Having originally planned the film as a direct sequel to Cloverfield, Abrams suggested that he had thought of something which, if they were lucky enough to get it made, "could be really cool [insofar as it] connects some stories" in a third film, even teasing a larger Cloverfield universe. Interviews with Trachtenberg and Winstead confirm that the movie is, and always was intended to be, an expansion of the first film, with Trachtenberg calling it the "Cloververse". Winstead has voiced her interest in returning for another installment.

In October 2016, it was revealed that the Abrams-produced God Particle would be the third installment in the Cloverfield franchise. After several postponements of the film's release date, it was released as a Netflix Original on February 4, 2018, under the new title The Cloverfield Paradox.

In The Cloverfield Paradox, Donal Logue cameos as Mark Stambler, a conspiracy theorist discussing the "Cloverfield Paradox"; reviewers observed that the character shares the same surname as Howard Stambler in 10 Cloverfield Lane. Suzanne Cryer, who appeared as Leslie in 10 Cloverfield Lane, also appears in a brief cameo role as a newscaster who interviews Stambler.

== See also ==
- List of films featuring extraterrestrials
