= Deaths in February 2013 =

The following is a list of notable deaths in February 2013.

Entries for each day are listed alphabetically by surname. A typical entry lists information in the following sequence:

- Name, age, country of citizenship and reason for notability, established cause of death, reference.

== February 2013 ==
=== 1 ===
- Jonathan Gavin 46,Scottish Judo World Masters.
- Barney, 12, American Scottish Terrier, First Dog of President George W. Bush (2001–2009), lymphoma.
- Gertrude Berman, 88, American politician.
- Rudolf Dašek, 79, Czech guitarist.
- Carol Brewster, 85, American actress (Untamed Women, Cat-Woman of the Moon, The Barkleys of Broadway) and model.
- Gisèle Guillemot, 90, French writer and a member of the French Resistance.
- Helene Hale, 94, American politician, Member of the Hawaii House of Representatives (2000–2006).
- John Hamber, 81, United States Virgin Islands Olympic sailor.
- Rocky Harris, 80, Australian cricket umpire.
- Sir Paul Holmes, 62, New Zealand broadcaster, prostate cancer and heart problems.
- Ian Johnston, 85, Australian rugby league player (Parramatta Eels, Western Suburbs).
- Ed Koch, 88, American politician, U.S. Representative from New York (1969–1977), Mayor of New York City (1978–1989), television judge (The People's Court), heart failure.
- Shanu Lahiri, 85, Indian painter.
- Bert Long Jr., 72, American chef, painter, photographer and sculptor, pancreatic cancer.
- Louis Luyt, 80, South African rugby union administrator and politician.
- Tony Palomo, 81, American Guamanian politician, historian and journalist.
- Robin Sachs, 61, English actor (Buffy the Vampire Slayer, Galaxy Quest, Babylon 5), heart attack.
- Dag Schjelderup-Ebbe, 86, Norwegian musicologist and composer.
- Milan Vápenka, 69, Czech Olympic volleyball player.
- Vladimir Yengibaryan, 80, Armenian light welterweight boxer, Olympic gold medallist (1956) for the Soviet Union.

=== 2 ===
- Arlene Ackerman, 66, American educator and public schools superintendent, pancreatic cancer.
- Michael D. Cohen, 67, American academic.
- Winston Derrick, 62, Antiguan journalist.
- Edith Houghton, 100, American baseball player and scout, first female scout in Major League Baseball.
- Abraham Iyambo, 52, Namibian politician, Minister of the Fisheries and Marine Resources (1997–2010); Minister of Education (since 2010), stroke.
- John Kerr, 81, American actor (South Pacific, The Streets of San Francisco).
- Chris Kyle, 38, American author and Navy SEAL sniper, most lethal in U.S. military history, shot.
- Sirajul Haq Memon, 79, Pakistani author, journalist and scholar, cardiac arrest.
- Necdet Menzir, 68, Turkish bureaucrat and politician, Minister of Transport (1997–1998), respiratory failure.
- Lino Oviedo, 69, Paraguayan politician and general, 2008; 2013 presidential candidate; leader of the National Union of Ethical Citizens, helicopter crash.
- Pepper Paire, 88, American AAGPBL baseball player, inspiration for A League of Their Own.
- Tarjei Rygnestad, 58, Norwegian physician.
- P. Shanmugam, 85, Indian politician, Chief Minister of Puducherry (2000–2001), head injuries from a fall.
- Jack Singer, 95, Canadian businessman and philanthropist.
- Frank Stirrup, 88, English rugby league player.
- Walt Sweeney, 71, American football player (San Diego Chargers), pancreatic cancer.
- Kenneth W. Thompson, 91, American academic.
- Guy F. Tozzoli, 90, American architect, lead designer of the World Trade Center.

=== 3 ===
- Wolfgang Abraham, 71, German footballer.
- Jadin Bell, 15, American bullying victim, suicide by hanging.
- B. H. Born, 80, American basketball player (University of Kansas).
- Cardiss Collins, 81, American politician, member of the U.S. House of Representatives from Illinois (1973–1997).
- John Michael D'Arcy, 80, American Roman Catholic prelate, Bishop of Fort Wayne-South Bend (1985–2009), lung and brain cancer.
- Steve Demeter, 78, American baseball player (Detroit Tigers, Cleveland Indians), heart disease.
- Deng Wei, 53, Chinese photographer.
- Matija Duh, 23, Slovenian speedway rider, head injuries.
- Joseph Egerega, 72, Nigerian Roman Catholic prelate, Apostolic Vicar of Bomadi (1997–2009).
- Luigi Falco, 61, Italian politician and doctor.
- Oscar Feltsman, 91, Russian composer.
- Peter Gilmore, 81, British actor (The Onedin Line, Carry On, Doctor Who).
- Ragnar Heurlin, 84, Swedish Olympic sprint cancer.
- Ichikawa Danjūrō XII, 66, Japanese Kabuki actor, pneumonia.
- James Muri, 93, American World War II pilot.
- David Oates, 50, British sports commentator (BBC Sport).
- Zlatko Papec, 79, Croatian footballer.
- Ignace Baguibassa Sambar-Talkena, 77, Togolese Roman Catholic prelate, Bishop of Kara (1996–2009).
- Mike Schwartz, 63, American anti-abortion activist, ALS.
- Kåre Syrstad, 73, Norwegian farmers' union leader.
- Robert Anthony Welch, 65, Irish author and academic, cancer.
- Jam Mohammad Yousaf, 58, Pakistani politician, Chief Minister of Balochistan (2002–2007), cardiac arrest.

=== 4 ===
- Kaarina Autio, 71, Finnish Olympic gymnast.
- Dirk Ballendorf, 73, American-born Guamanian historian.
- Donald Byrd, 80, American jazz trumpeter.
- Darlan, 5, British Thoroughbred racehorse, injuries sustained during a race.
- Margaret Frazer, 66, American historical novelist, breast cancer.
- Joe C. Gardner, 68, American politician, member of the Mississippi House of Representatives (since 2007).
- Richard E. Geis, 85, American science fiction writer.
- Des Raj Goyal, 83–84, Indian journalist, academic and author.
- Pat Halcox, 82, British jazz trumpeter.
- John Baptist Liu Jingshan, 99, Chinese Roman Catholic prelate, Bishop of Ningxia (1984–2009).
- Anthony Legge, 73, British archaeologist and academic.
- M. Bhanumathi, 66–67, Indian stage and film actress.
- Leonard Marsak, 88–89, American scholar.
- Achilla Orru, 53, Ugandan musician, heart disease.
- Theresia van der Pant, 88, Dutch sculptor (Equestrian statue of Queen Wilhelmina).
- Vernon Robert Pearson, 89, American jurist, Washington Supreme Court Chief Justice (1981–1989), hip surgery complications.
- John M. Peters, 86, American politician, member of the Iowa House of Representatives (1953–1955).
- Reg Presley, 71, British singer (The Troggs) and songwriter ("Love Is All Around"), lung cancer.
- Mohammad Ali Shah, 66, Pakistani surgeon and politician, Sindh Minister of Sports, heart attack.
- Stewie, 7–8, world's longest domestic cat, cancer.
- P. W. Underwood, 81, American football coach (Southern Mississippi).
- Essie Mae Washington-Williams, 87, American schoolteacher.

=== 5 ===
- Antonino Dos Santos Baptista, 79, Portuguese cyclist.
- Nel Büch, 81, Dutch Olympic sprinter (1952).
- Stuart Freeborn, 98, English make-up artist (Star Wars, 2001: A Space Odyssey, Superman).
- Reinaldo Gargano, 78, Uruguayan politician, Senator (1985–2005, 2008–2010), Minister of Foreign Affairs (2008–2010), heart failure.
- Harrison T. Groutage, 87, American painter and educator.
- Gerry Hambling, 86, English film editor (Pink Floyd – The Wall, Midnight Express, Mississippi Burning), BAFTA winner (1979, 1990, 1991).
- Egil Hovland, 88, Norwegian composer.
- Paul Gordon Jarvis, 77, British ecologist.
- Kenneth Jernstedt, 95, American fighter pilot.
- Charles Longbottom, 82, British politician, MP for York (1959–1966).
- Tom McGuigan, 91, New Zealand politician, MP for Lyttelton (1969–1975).
- Marshall Miles, 86, American bridge player and author, complications from a heart attack.
- Leda Mileva, 93, Bulgarian writer, translator and diplomat.
- Marguerite Perrou, 96, French Olympian
- Bazy Tankersley, 91, American newspaper publisher and horse breeder.
- Paul Tanner, 95, American trombonist, one of the last surviving members of the Glenn Miller Orchestra, complications from pneumonia.
- Adrianus Taroreh, 46, Indonesian Olympic boxer.
- Shelby Whitfield, 77, American sports announcer and author.
- Klaus Wyrtki, 87, American oceanographer.
- Derek Yalden, 72, British zoologist.

=== 6 ===
- Ronnie Allen, 74, American pool player.
- Chokri Belaid, 48, Tunisian politician, assassination by shooting.
- Menachem Elon, 89, Israeli jurist, justice on the Supreme Court (1977–1993).
- Arthé Guimond, 81, Canadian Roman Catholic prelate, Archbishop of Grouard-McLennan (2000–2006).
- Joseph Madec, 89, French Roman Catholic prelate, Bishop of Fréjus-Toulon (1983–2000).
- Alden Mason, 93, American artist.
- Mo-Do, 46, Italian musician ("Eins, Zwei, Polizei"), suicide.
- Walter Nowick, 87, American teacher of Rinzai Zen.
- Ira Rubin, 82, American professional bridge player.
- Yahya Sulong, 84, Malaysian comedian and actor.
- Betty Twarog, 85, American biochemist.
- René Vestri, 74, French politician, Senator for Alpes-Maritimes (since 2008) and Mayor of Saint-Jean-Cap-Ferrat (since 2002).
- Adrián Villagómez García, 61, Mexican politician, MP for Nuevo León (2003–2006).
- Douglas Warren, 93, Australian Roman Catholic prelate, Bishop of Wilcannia-Forbes (1967–1994).

=== 7 ===
- William Anthony Hughes, 91, American Roman Catholic prelate, Bishop of Covington (1979–1995).
- L. Brent Kington, 78, American blacksmith and educator.
- Nic Knudtzon, 90, Norwegian telecommunications engineer.
- Howard Lassoff, 57, American and Israeli basketball player (Maccabi Tel Aviv).
- Like-A-Butterfly, 18, Irish Thoroughbred racehorse and broodmare, colic.
- John Livermore, 94, American geologist.
- Niki Marangou, 65, Cypriot writer and painter, traffic collision.
- José Moustache, 80, Guadeloupean politician, President of the Regional Council (1983–1986).
- Amedeus Msarikie, 81, Tanzanian Roman Catholic prelate, Bishop of Moshi (1986–2007).
- K. K. Nair, 82, Indian politician.
- Aki Orr, 81, German–born Israeli politician and writer.
- Krsto Papić, 79, Croatian screenwriter and film director (My Uncle's Legacy).
- Peter Steen, 77, Danish actor.
- Elvi Svendsen, 93, Danish Olympic swimmer.
- József Tóth, 72, Hungarian geographer and academic, rector of the University of Pécs.
- Jürgen Untermann, 84, German linguist.

=== 8 ===
- Sam Boaz, 95, American politician, member of Tennessee House of Representatives (1963–1967).
- Ralph Braun, 72, American businessman, founder and CEO of Braun Corporation.
- Chris Brinker, 42, American producer (The Boondock Saints) and director, aortic aneurysm.
- Giovanni Cheli, 94, Italian Roman Catholic cardinal, Permanent Observer of the Holy See to the United Nations (1973–1986), natural causes.
- Claude Covassi, 42, Swiss criminal and spy, drug overdose.
- James DePreist, 76, American conductor, complications from heart attack.
- Herbert C. Dessauer, 91, American biochemist.
- Maureen Dragone, 93, American journalist and author.
- Jan Ellis, 71, South African rugby player, cancer.
- Hiromasa Ezoe, 76, Japanese industrialist, founder of Recruit, pneumonia.
- Ron Hansell, 82, English footballer.
- Kjell Hjertsson, 90, Swedish footballer.
- Marjorie Housepian Dobkin, 90, American academic and author.
- Patricia Hughes, 90, British radio announcer.
- K. Daniel Haley, 83, American politician, member of the New York State Assembly (1971–1976).
- György Kézdy, 76, Hungarian actor.
- Lyle Lahey, 81, American political cartoonist.
- Ian Lister, 66, Scottish footballer (Aberdeen, Dunfermline Athletic).
- Joseph Ma Xue-sheng, 89, Chinese Roman Catholic prelate, Bishop of Zhoucun (since 1997).
- Mervyn McCord, 83, British army officer.
- Des McGovern, 84, Australian rugby league footballer.
- Jack Dale Mengenen, 91, Australian indigenous artist.
- Motsapi Moorosi, 67, Lesotho Olympic sprinter.
- John Morris, 76, Australian politician, Senator for New South Wales (1985–1990).
- Knut Nesbø, 51, Norwegian footballer (Molde, Lyn, Stabæk), guitarist (Di Derre) and sports reporter, cancer.
- Funmilola Ogundana, 32, Nigerian sprinter, died while giving birth.
- Renato Olivieri, 87, Italian giallo novelist.
- Rushdi Said, 92, Egyptian geologist.
- Dieter Schütte, 89, German publisher (M. DuMont Schauberg).
- Nevin S. Scrimshaw, 95, American nutritionist.
- Yodtong Senanan, 75, Thai Muay Thai master and trainer.
- Alan Sharp, 79, Scottish screenwriter (Rob Roy, Night Moves).
- Bill Smith, 88, American Olympic swimmer.
- Alfred Sosgórnik, 79, Polish Olympic athlete.
- Jim Sweeney, 83, American football coach (Fresno State).

=== 9 ===
- Richard Artschwager, 89, American painter, sculptor and illustrator, stroke.
- Robert Ashton, 88, British historian.
- Gérard Asselin, 62, Canadian politician, MP for Charlevoix (1993–2004) and Manicouagan (2004–2011).
- Mike Banks, 90, British mountaineer and Royal Marines officer.
- Enar Edberg, 76, Swedish Olympic weightlifter.
- Bremer Ehrler, 98, American politician, Secretary of State of Kentucky (1988–1992).
- Keiko Fukuda, 99, Japanese-born American martial artist.
- Afzal Guru, 43, Indian Islamist terrorist (2001 Indian Parliament attack), execution by hanging.
- H. Palmer Hall, 70, American poet, fiction writer, essayist, editor, and librarian.
- Bill Irwin, 92, Canadian Olympic skier.
- Miles J. Jones, 60, American forensic pathologist.
- Colin Laverty, 75, Australian doctor and art collector.
- Mark Linz, 77, German publisher.
- Leonardo Polo, 87, Spanish philosopher.
- Phil Remington, 92, American motorsports engineer.
- Jimmy Smyth, 82, Irish hurler (Clare).
- Richard Twiss, 58, American educator and author, heart attack.
- Kåre Valebrokk, 72, Norwegian journalist, editor and television executive (TV 2).

=== 10 ===
- Cornelis Bas, 85, Dutch mycologist.
- W. Watts Biggers, 85, American novelist, creator of Underdog.
- Sara Braverman, 95, Romanian-born Israeli Jewish Parachutists of Mandate Palestine member, co-founder of the IDF Women's Corps.
- Marianne Brenton, 79, American politician, member of the Massachusetts House of Representatives (1992–1998).
- Pery Burge, 57, English artist, cancer.
- Marie-Pierre Castel, 64, French actress (The Nude Vampire, The Shiver of the Vampires, Requiem for a Vampire).
- Norman Crowder, 86, English priest, Archdeacon of Portsmouth (1985–1993).
- Frank Farrelly, 81, American psychologist.
- Baron Fielakepa, 51, Tongan government minister.
- Sir John Gilmour, 4th Baronet, 68, British soldier and aristocrat.
- David Hartman, 81, American-born Israeli rabbi and philosopher.
- Boris Jacobsson, 75, Swedish Olympic sailor.
- Lolong, Filipino-born saltwater crocodile, largest in captivity, pneumonia and cardiac arrest.
- Bill Roost, 88, English footballer (Bristol Rovers).
- Thierry Rupert, 35, French basketball player, complications of a heart attack.
- Jake Thies, 86, American baseball player (Pittsburgh Pirates).
- Eugenio Trías Sagnier, 70, Spanish philosopher.
- Ikuzo Sakurai, 68, Japanese politician.
- Petro Vlahos, 96, American visual effects inventor and designer.
- Zhuang Zedong, 72, Chinese table tennis player, involved in ping-pong diplomacy.

=== 11 ===
- Tom Aspell, 62, New Zealand-born American foreign correspondent (NBC News), lung cancer.
- Jim Boatwright, 61, American basketball player (Maccabi Tel Aviv), liver cancer.
- Oswaldo Brenes Álvarez, 70, Costa Rican Roman Catholic prelate, Bishop of Ciudad Quesada (2008–2012).
- Esther Buckley, 64, American educator, member of the United States Commission on Civil Rights (1983–1992), traffic collision.
- Wayne Chernecki, 63, Canadian ice hockey player and businessman, lung cancer.
- Mark Dalby, 75, British prelate, Archdeacon of Rochdale (1991–2000).
- Kelefa Diallo, 53, Guinean general, Army chief of staff, plane crash.
- William R. Eadington, 67, American economist.
- Jack Eskridge, 89, American professional basketball player.
- Kevin Gray, 55, American musical theatre actor (The Phantom of the Opera, The King and I), heart attack.
- Yasuko Hatoyama, 90, Japanese political financier, MODS.
- Richard Hill, 7th Baron Sandys, 81, British peer and landowner.
- Rick Huxley, 72, English musician (The Dave Clark Five).
- Vi Lloyd, 89, Australian politician, member of the New South Wales Legislative Council (1973–1981).
- Teodor Lucuță, 57, Romanian footballer (Dinamo București), stroke and heart failure.
- Auguste Mboe, 78, Central African diplomat and politician.
- William D. Metz, 98, American historian.
- Krzysztof Michalski, 64, Polish philosopher.
- Kevin Peek, 66, Australian musician (Sky), melanoma.
- Erik Quistgaard, 91, Danish engineer, director general of the European Space Agency (1980–1984).
- Mark Scott, 89, British rower.
- Brooke E. Sheldon, 81, American librarian.
- Zoe Țapu, 78, Romanian agronomist.
- Chrysler Thomas, 78, Grenadian politician, MP and Minister of Agriculture (1973–1979).
- Rem Viakhirev, 78, Russian businessman, Chairman of Gazprom (1992–2001).
- Pavlo Vigderhaus, 87, Ukrainian architect.
- D. Vinayachandran, 66, Indian Malayalam poet.
- Matthew White, 55, American basketball player (University of Pennsylvania), stabbing.
- Alfred Zijai, 52, Albanian footballer (Flamurtari Vlorë).

=== 12 ===
- Sattam bin Abdulaziz Al Saud, 72, Saudi royal, Governor of Riyadh Province (since 2011).
- Bill Bell, 81, English businessman, Chairman of Port Vale F.C. (1987–2002).
- Marion Bryden, 94, Canadian politician, MPP of the Legislative Assembly of Ontario for Beaches—Woodbine (1975–1990).
- Keith Clayton, 84, English geographer and environmental scientist.
- Barnaby Conrad, 90, American author, heart failure.
- Mal Couch, 74, American theologian.
- Christopher Dorner, 33, American murderer, suicide by gunshot.
- Bobby Gore, 76, American gang leader and activist.
- Brian Langford, 77, English cricketer (Somerset).
- Jimmy Mulroy, 72, Irish Gaelic football player and manager, member of the Seanad Éireann (1987–1989).
- Richard Orton, 72, British composer and academic.
- C. R. Krishnaswamy Rao Sahib, 86, Indian civil servant.
- Kurt Redel, 94, German musician and conductor.
- Rita Ridley, 66, British middle-distance runner and Commonwealth Games gold medallist, cancer.
- Frank Seator, 37, Liberian footballer.
- Tarmizi Taher, 76, Indonesian naval officer and politician, Minister of Religious Affairs (1993–1998).
- Yasushi Takahashi, 88, Japanese theoretical physicist.
- Reginald Turnill, 97, British aerospace correspondent (BBC), heart failure.
- Jim Tysinger, 91, American politician, member of the Georgia Senate (1969–1998), pneumonia.
- Hennadiy Udovenko, 81, Ukrainian politician, Minister for Foreign Affairs (1994–1998), President of the United Nations General Assembly (1997–1998).

=== 13 ===
- John Ammonds, 88, British television producer.
- Gabriele Basilico, 68, Italian photographer, cancer.
- Paul Benzaquin, 90, American broadcaster.
- Gerry Day, 91, American screenwriter (The Black Hole, Dennis the Menace).
- George Finch, 82, British architect.
- Izya Gershtein, 89, Kyrgyzstani film director.
- John Holt, 53, American football player (Tampa Bay Buccaneers, Indianapolis Colts).
- Pieter Kooijmans, 79, Dutch jurist, diplomat and politician, Minister of Foreign Affairs (1993–1994), Minister of State (since 2007).
- Oswald LeWinter, 81, Austrian-born American writer.
- David Lister, 82, British origami historian.
- Andrée Malebranche, 96, Afro-Haitian painter and art instructor.
- Harry Miller, 86, American college basketball coach (Fresno State, Wichita State, Stephen F. Austin).
- Mos, 58, Burmese comedian and actor, liver disease.
- Ove Nilsson, 84, Swedish Olympic rower.
- William Randall, 97, American Negro league baseball player.
- Don Scott, 84, British Olympic silver-medalist boxer (1948), Parkinson's disease.
- Robert Senelle, 94, Belgian academic and constitutionalist.
- Yuko Tojo, 73, Japanese political activist, interstitial pneumonia.
- Ivan Večenaj, 92, Croatian painter.
- Stefan Wigger, 80, German television actor.
- Georges Wohlfart, 62, Luxembourgish politician, Minister for Health (1998–1999).
- Tibor Zsíros, 82, Hungarian Olympic basketball player and coach.

=== 14 ===
- Glenn Boyer, 89, American author and Wyatt Earp historian.
- Mary Brave Bird, 58, American Lakota writer and activist.
- Nurit Cohen, 73, Israeli actress (Life is Not Everything), cancer.
- Richard Collins, 98, American screenwriter (Bonanza, Matlock), pneumonia.
- Luis Cruzado, 71, Peruvian footballer (Universitario).
- Frank DiPaolo, 106, American political figure and restaurateur.
- Ronald Dworkin, 81, American philosopher and legal scholar, leukemia.
- Walt Easley, 55, American football player (San Francisco 49ers).
- Glynn Gregory, 73, American football player.
- Aleksander Gudzowaty, 74, Polish businessman and economist.
- Goldie Harvey, 31, Nigerian R&B and pop singer and television personality, intracerebral hemorrhage.
- Mark Kamins, 57, American disc jockey, discovered Madonna, heart failure.
- Sir Montague Levine, 90, British coroner and physician.
- Fernando Lyra, 74, Brazilian politician, Minister of Justice (1985–1986), cardiopathy.
- Shadow Morton, 72, American songwriter ("Leader of the Pack") and record producer (The Shangri-Las, Vanilla Fudge), cancer.
- Kenneth Nance, 71, American politician, member of the Oklahoma House of Representatives (1968–1978), lung infection.
- Friedrich Neznansky, 80, Russian writer.
- Peter Olver, 95, British World War II fighter ace.
- T. L. Osborn, 89, American televangelist and author.
- Glenn Snyder, 88, American author and political scientist.
- Reeva Steenkamp, 29, South African model, shot.
- Tim Dog, 46, American rapper, complications of diabetes.
- Kazuo Tsunoda, 94, Japanese fighter pilot.
- Kimberly Walker, American soldier, strangled.
- Zdeněk Zikán, 75, Czech footballer.

=== 15 ===
- Sheikh Abdulkadir Nur Farah, 73, Somali cleric, preacher, and Islamic scholar known for his contributions to Dawah, Assassinated by Al-Shabab.
- Hector Catling, 88, British archaeologist.
- Cummin Clancy, 90, Irish Olympic discus thrower and businessman.
- Kenneth Dement, 80, American attorney, College Football Hall of Fame player, Southeast Missouri State University Board of Regents president.
- Pat Derby, 70, British–born American animal trainer, throat cancer.
- Alain Desrosières, 72, French statistician.
- Ian Fowler, 73, British journalist (Manchester Evening News), first person to link Moors Murders, Parkinson's disease.
- Giovanni Narcis Hakkenberg, 89, Dutch Sea-lieutenant of the Royal Dutch Marines, decorated war hero and knight of the Military Order of William.
- Earle Howard, 86, American politician, member of the Indiana House of Representatives (1986–1994).
- Carmelo Imbriani, 37, Italian football player (S.S.C. Napoli, Genoa C.F.C.) and manager (Benevento Calcio), lymphoma.
- Sanan Kachornprasart, 77, Thai general and politician, Deputy Prime Minister (1990, 1998–2000, 2008–2011), blood infection.
- Ivan Kazanets, 94, Ukrainian politician, Chairman of the Council of Ministers of the Ukrainian SSR (1963–1965); Minister of Ferrous Metallurgy of the Soviet Union.
- Todor Kolev, 73, Bulgarian actor (The Goat Horn, The Hare Census, Toplo, King for a Day, Opasen char), lung cancer.
- John A. MacNaughton, 67, Canadian financier and executive, Hodgkin's lymphoma.
- Bill Morrison, 84, Australian politician, federal MP for St George (1969–1975, 1980–1984), Minister for Defence (1975).
- Dattaji Nalawade, 77, Indian politician, Speaker of the Maharashtra Legislative Assembly (1995–1999).
- Alberto Nogar, 78, Filipo weightlifter, natural causes.
- Tony Speller, 83, British politician, MP for North Devon (1979–1992).
- Bill Steltemeier, 83, American executive, President (1980–2000), CEO (2000–2009), and Chairman (2000–2013) of Eternal Word Television Network.
- Branford Taitt, 74, Barbadian politician, Minister of Foreign Affairs (1993–1994), President of the Senate (2008–2012).
- Alan Tottoh, 68, British Olympic boxer.
- Alberto Valtierra, 81, Spanish Olympic rower.

=== 16 ===
- John Ayldon, 69, British opera singer.
- Claudette Boyer, 75, Canadian politician, member of the Legislative Assembly of Ontario for Ottawa—Vanier (1999–2003), intracranial hemorrhage.
- Ken Clark, 46, American football player (Indianapolis Colts, Nebraska Cornhuskers), heart attack.
- Jan Dahm, 91, Norwegian World War II resistance member.
- Benjamin Dy, 60, Filipino politician, Governor of Isabela (1992–2001), emphysema.
- Colin Edwards, 21, Guyanese footballer, traffic collision.
- Eric Ericson, 94, Swedish choral conductor and teacher.
- Ken Gill, 80, British Anglican bishop, Bishop of Central Karnataka (South India; 1972–1980) and Assistant Bishop of Newcastle (England, 1980–1998).
- Ennio Girolami, 78, Italian actor.
- Jesús Ramón Martínez de Ezquerecocha Suso, 77, Spanish-born Ecuadorian Roman Catholic prelate, Bishop of Babahoyo (1994–2008).
- Les McNichol, 80, New Zealand rugby league player.
- Grigory Pomerants, 94, Russian philosopher and cultural theorist.
- Paul Rice, 64, English cricketer.
- Edwin Russell, 73, English sculptor.
- Tony Sheridan, 72, English rock and roll singer, early collaborator with The Beatles.
- Harald Siepermann, 50, German animator (Tarzan, Who Framed Roger Rabbit, Enchanted), cancer.
- Ernie Vossler, 84, American professional golfer and course designer, dementia.
- Markus Zürcher, 66, Swiss artist.

=== 17 ===
- Francis J. Aguilar, 80, American business academic.
- Derek Batey, 84, English quiz show host (Mr. & Mrs.).
- William Bridges, 79, American author and business consultant, complications of Lewy body disease.
- Richard Briers, 79, British actor (The Good Life, Ever Decreasing Circles, Peter Pan), emphysema.
- Manoranjan Das, 89, Indian playwright.
- Debbie Ford, 57, American author, cancer.
- André Gingras, 46, Canadian dancer and choreographer, cancer.
- Milan Gvero, 75, Bosnian Serb general (Army of Republika Srpska).
- Phil Henderson, 44, American basketball player (Duke University).
- Shmulik Kraus, 77, Israeli actor and pop rock singer, swine influenza.
- Sophie Kurys, 87, American baseball player (Racine Belles), complications from surgery.
- Tony Lorick, 71, American football player (Baltimore Colts, New Orleans Saints).
- Georg Luck, 87, Swiss academic.
- Mindy McCready, 37, American country music singer (Ten Thousand Angels), suicide by gunshot.
- Luis Paulino Mora Mora, 68, Costa Rican jurist, President of the Supreme Court of Justice of Costa Rica (since 1999), pneumonia and diabetes.
- Seán Óg Ó Ceallacháin, 89, Irish sports broadcaster.
- Louis Spadia, 92, American football executive, founder of the Bay Area Sports Hall of Fame.
- Maretta Taylor, 78, American politician, member of the Georgia House of Representatives (1990–2002).
- Mike Westhues, 64, American singer-songwriter and guitarist.
- David Whitehouse, 71, British-born American museum executive (The Corning Museum of Glass), cancer.

=== 18 ===
- Ahmadullah Affandi, 90, Indian scout leader and footballer.
- Kevin Ayers, 68, English psychedelic rock songwriter and musician (Soft Machine, Wilde Flowers).
- Otto Beisheim, 89, German billionaire businessman, founder of Metro AG, suicide.
- Kevin Black, 69, New Zealand radio broadcaster, suspected heart attack.
- Jerry Buss, 80, American entrepreneur, owner of the Los Angeles Lakers, cancer and kidney failure.
- Alger Chapman Jr., 81, American finance executive, CEO and Chairman of the Chicago Board Options Exchange (1986–1997), heart failure.
- Chu Hsing-yu, 56, Taiwanese politician, MLY (1993–2005), heart attack.
- B. G. Dyess, 90, American politician.
- Elspet Gray, Baroness Rix, 83, Scottish actress and philanthropist.
- Damon Harris, 62, American soul and R&B singer (The Temptations), prostate cancer.
- Godfrey Hewitt, 73, British evolutionary geneticist.
- Chieko Honda, 49, Japanese voice actress (Mobile Suit Gundam ZZ, Here is Greenwood), cancer.
- James Irvine, 54, British furniture designer.
- Okey Isima, 56, Nigerian Olympic footballer.
- Igal Lichtman, American technology chief executive, cancer.
- Anthony Theodore Lobo, 75, Pakistani Roman Catholic prelate, Bishop of Islamabad-Rawalpindi (1993–2010).
- Matt Mattox, 91, American jazz and ballet teacher.
- Craig McKinley, 48, Canadian physician and aquanaut (NEEMO 7 mission).
- Gustaf Adolf Neumann, 88, Austrian journalist.
- Mikhail Pakhomov, 36, Russian politician.
- Otfried Preußler, 89, German children's book author (The Robber Hotzenplotz). (German)
- Qian Haiyan, 57, Chinese civil servant and diplomat, cancer.
- Shayle R. Searle, 84, New Zealand-born American statistician, cancer.
- Joel Silberg, 85, Israeli director and screenwriter.
- Pep Simek, 86, American businessman, founder of Tombstone pizza.
- Alan F. Westin, 83, American academic, cancer.
- Hugh E. Wild, 94, American air force general.
- Martin Zweig, 70, American financier.

=== 19 ===
- Armen Alchian, 98, American economist.
- Pete D. Anderson, 81, American jockey and racehorse trainer.
- George Aratani, 95, American entrepreneur (Kenwood) and philanthropist, complications of pneumonia.
- Ardyce Bohlke, 69, American politician, member of the Nebraska Legislature (1991–2000), brain tumor.
- John Brascia, 80, American dancer (White Christmas, Meet Me in Las Vegas), Parkinson's disease.
- Joaquín Cordero, 89, Mexican actor.
- Elmer Diedtrich, 85, American politician, member of South Dakota House of Representatives (1989–1992, 1999–2000) and Senate (2001–2002).
- Johnny Downie, 87, Scottish footballer.
- Hans Ernback, 70, Swedish actor.
- Justus Esiri, 70, Nigerian actor, complications of diabetes.
- Gerhard Frey, 80, German financier and politician, Chairman of the German People's Union (1971–2009).
- Börje Jeppsson, 84, Swedish Olympic weightlifter.
- M. Hasan Ali Khan, 63, Bangladeshi naval officer, Chief of Naval Staff (2005–2007).
- Elisa Lam, 21, Canadian student, accidental drowning, (body discovered on this date).
- Radhakishan Malviya, 69, Indian politician.
- Lou Myers, 77, American actor (The Wedding Planner, A Different World), complications from pneumonia.
- Jon Odlum, 76, Saint Lucian politician.
- Park Chul-soo, 64, South Korean film director, traffic collision.
- Robert Coleman Richardson, 75, American physicist, winner of Nobel Prize for Physics (1996), complications following heart attack.
- Donald Richie, 88, American-born Japanese film critic and cinematic author.
- G. Ross Roy, 88, Scottish literature scholar.
- Hubert Schieth, 86, German football player and manager.
- Mickey Stubblefield, 86, American baseball player (Kansas City Monarchs).
- Pedro Lisímaco de Jesús Vílchez Vílchez, 83, Nicaraguan Roman Catholic prelate, Bishop of Jinotega (1982–2005).
- Eugene Whelan, 88, Canadian politician, MP for Essex South (1962–1968), for Essex (1968–1984), Senator for SW Ontario (1996–1999), stroke complications.
- Martin Wilk, 90, Canadian statistician.
- Chip Woodrum, 74, American politician, member of the Virginia General Assembly for Roanoke (1980–2003).
- Jane C. Wright, 93, American oncologist.

=== 20 ===
- Avraham Brandwein, 67, Israeli rabbi.
- Kenji Eno, 42, Japanese video game developer (D), heart failure.
- Jean Gauthier, 75, Canadian ice hockey player (Montreal Canadiens, Philadelphia Flyers, Boston Bruins).
- Brima George, Sierra Leonean footballer
- John Finbarr Jones, 83, Irish–born American academic.
- William Letwin, 90, Anglo-American academic.
- Emma McDougall, 21, English footballer (Blackburn Rovers L.F.C.), cancer.
- David S. McKay, 77, American astrobiologist (NASA).
- Antonio Roma, 80, Argentine footballer.
- Rex Scouten, 88, American civil servant, White House Chief Usher (1969–1986), White House Office of the Curator (1986–1997).
- Yussef Suleiman, 26, Syrian footballer (Al-Wathba SC), mortar attack.
- Ozzie Sweet, 94, American film actor and sports photographer.
- Osmo Antero Wiio, 85, Finnish academic and politician, MP (1975–1979).
- Neil Wilson, 77, American baseball player.

=== 21 ===
- John Clappison, 75, English ceramic and glass designer.
- Scott Clark, 43, American comic book artist (X-Men, Martian Manhunter, Deathstroke).
- Raymond Cusick, 84, British TV designer (Doctor Who), heart failure.
- Norbert Dorsey, 83, American Roman Catholic prelate, Bishop of Orlando (1990–2004), cancer.
- Patrick Ellis, 84, American academic, President of La Salle University (1977–1992) and CUA (1992–1998).
- Nazem Ganjapour, 69, Iranian footballer.
- Aleksei Yuryevich German, 74, Russian filmmaker.
- Bob Godfrey, 91, British animator (Henry's Cat, Roobarb) and Academy Award-winning (1975) short film maker (Great).
- Willi Gutmann, 85, Swiss sculptor.
- Hasse Jeppson, 87, Swedish footballer.
- Masahiro Kanagawa, 29, Japanese criminal, execution by hanging.
- Kaoru Kobayashi, 44, Japanese criminal, execution by hanging.
- Francisco José Madero González, 82, Mexican politician, Governor of Coahuila (1981).
- Magic Slim, 75, American blues singer and guitarist.
- Bruce Millan, 85, Scottish politician, Secretary of State for Scotland (1976–1979), European Commissioner for Regional Policy (1989–1995), bronchopneumonia.
- Dick Neal Jr., 79, English footballer.
- Louis F. Oberdorfer, 94, American senior judge, United States District Court for the District of Columbia (1977–2013), natural causes.
- Glenn K. Otis, 83, American army general.
- Filoteo Samaniego, 84, Ecuadorian translator and diplomat.
- Yuriy Shulyatytskyi, 70, Ukrainian football coach.
- Cleotha Staples, 78, American gospel singer (The Staple Singers), member of the Rock and Roll Hall of Fame, Alzheimer's disease.
- Del Tenney, 82, American actor and film director.
- Tom Tipps, 90, American politician, member of the Oklahoma House of Representatives (1952–1954) and Senate (1954–1962).
- G. Venkatraman, 82, Indian politician.
- Merlin Volzke, 87, American jockey and racing official.
- Zheng Cao, 46, Chinese opera singer, lung cancer.

=== 22 ===
- Debi Austin, 62, American anti-smoking advocate, cancer.
- Shu-Park Chan, 83, Chinese–born American academic, founded International Technological University.
- P. Chuba Chang, 47, Indian politician, MLA for Tuensang Sadar-II (1998–2013).
- Bob Corbin, 90, American politician, member of the Ohio House of Representatives (1976–2000).
- Hans Hallén, 77, Swedish Olympic bobsledder.
- George Ives, 87, American actor (Bewitched, Green Acres, Perry Mason).
- Ava June, 81, British opera singer.
- Atje Keulen-Deelstra, 74, Dutch quadruple world champion, Olympic silver and bronze medallist (all 1972), world record holder speed skater, cerebral infarction.
- Neil Mann, 88, Australian VFL football player and coach (Collingwood).
- Jean-Louis Michon, 88, French academic.
- Claude Monteux, 92, American flautist and conductor.
- Enver Ören, 74, Turkish businessman, renal failure.
- Mario Ramírez, 55, Puerto Rican baseball player (New York Mets, San Diego Padres).
- Wolfgang Sawallisch, 89, German conductor and pianist.
- Hari Shankar Singhania, 79, Indian industrialist.
- Behsat Üvez, 53, Turkish singer and composer, lung cancer.

=== 23 ===
- Viljo Aho, 80, Finnish Olympic boxer.
- José Gustavo Angel Ramírez, 78, Colombian Roman Catholic prelate, Vicar Apostolic of Mitú (1989–2009).
- Benedict Ashley, 97, American theologian and philosopher.
- Eugene Bookhammer, 94, American politician, Lieutenant Governor of Delaware (1969–1977).
- Joan Child, 91, Australian politician, MP for Henty (1974–1975, 1980–1990), first female Speaker of House of Representatives (1986–1989).
- Jack Choquette, 84, American stock car racing driver.
- Joseph Friedenson, 90, Holocaust survivor, Holocaust historian, Yiddish writer, lecturer and editor.
- Nigel Glendinning, 83, British art historian.
- Donald A. Haggar, 88, American politician, member of the South Dakota House of Representatives (1959–1960).
- George A. Hamid Jr., 94, American entertainment businessman.
- Michael Inchbald, 92, British architectural and interior designer.
- Howard Liddell, 67, British architect, cancer.
- Paul C. P. McIlhenny, 68, American businessman, CEO of Tabasco, heart attack.
- Mary Ann McMorrow, 83, American judge, first female judge for Supreme Court of Illinois (1992–2006); first female Chief Justice (2002–2005).
- Julien Ries, 92, Belgian Roman Catholic prelate, Cardinal of Sant'Antonio di Padova a Circonvallazione Appia (since 2012).
- Maurice Rosy, 85, Belgian comics writer.
- Sonny Russo, 83, American jazz trombonist.
- Lotika Sarkar, 90, Indian academic.
- Sylvia Smith, 67, British writer, pulmonary disease.
- Sir Richard Worsley, 89, British Army general.

=== 24 ===
- Roy Brown Jr., 96, American car design engineer (Edsel, Ford Consul, Ford Cortina), complications from Parkinson's disease and pneumonia.
- Dave Charlton, 76, British-born South African racing driver.
- John Driftmier, 30, Canadian television director, plane crash.
- Paul Enock, 78, Canadian Olympic speed skater.
- Sir Denis Forman, 95, British television executive, Chairman of Granada Television (1974–1987).
- Ralph Hotere, 81, New Zealand artist, pneumonia.
- Farideh Lashai, 68, Iranian contemporary artist, cancer.
- Con Martin, 89, Irish Gaelic and association football player.
- Alexis Nihon Jr., 67, Canadian real estate businessman, Olympic wrestler for The Bahamas (1968), cancer.
- Andrew Nisbet Jr., 91, American politician and military officer, member of the Washington House of Representatives (1978–1982).
- Seamus O'Connell, 83, English footballer.
- Frank Joseph Polozola, 71, American senior (former chief) judge, US District Court for Middle Louisiana (1980–2013), cancer.
- Mahmoud Salem, 82, Egyptian author, cardiac dysfunction.
- Tjokorda Ngurah Wim Sukawati, 90, Indonesian Balinese royal and diplomat.
- Dick Yelvington, 84, American football player (New York Giants).

=== 25 ===
- Abdelhamid Abou Zeid, 47–48, Algerian al-Qaeda commander, military action.
- Allan B. Calhamer, 81, American boardgame inventor (Diplomacy).
- Arnold Coates, 76, English footballer.
- William J. Duffy, 96, American jurist and politician.
- Herb Epp, 78, Canadian politician, MPP of the Ontario Legislature for Waterloo North (1977–1990).
- Stewart "Dirk" Fischer, 88, American jazz musician and composer.
- Claudis James, 69, American football player.
- Samuel Kivuitu, 74, Kenyan election official and politician, MP for Parklands (1969–1974, 1983–1988), throat cancer.
- C. Everett Koop, 96, American pediatric surgeon and public health administrator, Surgeon General of the United States (1982–1989).
- Phillip Leishman, 61, New Zealand broadcaster, brain tumour.
- Lennart Lindgren, 93, Swedish Navy captain.
- Doris Lorenz-Müller, 78, German Olympic athlete.
- Ralph P. Martin, 87, British New Testament scholar.
- Carmen Montejo, 87, Cuban-born Mexican actress.
- Ray O'Connor, 86, Australian politician, Premier of Western Australia (1982–1983).
- Rick Porter, 58, American actor.
- Willy Rizzo, 84, Italian-born French news and celebrity photographer (Paris Match), and furniture designer.
- Heikki Siren, 94, Finnish architect.
- Dan Toler, 64, American musician (Allman Brothers Band), amyotrophic lateral sclerosis.
- Milan Velimirović, 60, Serbian chess problemist and publisher.

=== 26 ===
- Marie-Claire Alain, 86, French organist.
- Randolph Bromery, 87, American educator, Chancellor of the University of Massachusetts Amherst (1971–1979).
- Harold G. Clarke, 85, American judge, member of the Georgia Supreme Court (1979–1994), Chief Justice (1990–1994).
- Giovanni D'Ascenzi, 93, Italian Roman Catholic prelate, Bishop of Sovana–Pitigliano–Orbetello (1975–1981) and Arezzo–Cortona–Sansepolcro (1981–1996).
- Donald R. Deskins Jr., 80, American football player (Oakland Raiders), geographer and sociologist.
- Timothy Donaldson, 79, Bahamian banker, first Governor of the Central Bank (1974–1980), Ambassador to the United States, cancer.
- Ronald Edwards, 95, South African cricketer.
- James Ferguson, 87, Canadian politician.
- Jan Howard Finder, 73, American science fiction writer, renal and liver failure.
- Bert Flugelman, 90, Australian sculptor, complications from polio.
- Tom Griffin, 96, American aviator, member of the Doolittle Raid.
- Herbie Hall, 86, British Olympic wrestler.
- Stéphane Hessel, 95, German-born French author and diplomat, member of the French Resistance, survivor of Buchenwald, Mittelbau-Dora and Bergen-Belsen.
- Adrian Hollis, 72, English correspondence chess grandmaster.
- Huỳnh Văn Cao, 85, Vietnamese politician and major general (Army of the Republic of Vietnam).
- Simon Li, 90, Hong Kong judge and politician.
- Marco McMillian, 33, American businessman and political candidate, homicide.
- William Perehudoff, 94, Canadian painter.
- Maya Jackson Randall, 33, American financial journalist (The Wall Street Journal), leukemia.
- Eugene P. Sheehy, 90, American academic librarian.
- Kaoru Shimamura, 43, Japanese voice actress, breast cancer.
- Sung Chan-gyeong, 82, South Korean poet.
- Donald Thompson, 85, American Olympic fencer and academic.
- Dobrivoje Trivić, 69, Serbian footballer (FK Vojvodina, Toulouse FC, Olympique Lyonnais).

=== 27 ===
- María Asquerino, 87, Spanish film actress, respiratory failure.
- Henri Caillavet, 99, French politician, gay rights and pro-choice advocate, Senator (1967–1983), MEP (1979–1984).
- Van Cliburn, 78, American pianist, bone cancer.
- Ramon Dekkers, 43, Dutch kickboxer, eight-time Muay Thai world champion, myocardial infarction.
- David Dewaele, 36, French actor, stroke.
- Robin M. Hochstrasser, 82, Scottish–born American chemist.
- Doreen Kimura, 80, Canadian psychologist.
- Molly Lefebure, 93, British writer.
- Low Meng Tak, 90–91, Chinese Malaysian businessman and philanthropist, leukemia.
- Mike Marienthal, 89, American football player and coach (UCLA).
- Walter Pierce, 93, American architect.
- Dale Robertson, 89, American actor (Death Valley Days, Tales of Wells Fargo, Dynasty), lung cancer and pneumonia.
- Jim Starrak, 84, American ice-hockey player.
- Richard Street, 70, American singer (The Monitors, The Temptations), pulmonary embolism.
- Roy Stuart, 92, American football player.
- Terry Twell, 66, English footballer.
- Adolfo Zaldívar, 69, Chilean politician and lawyer, Senator (1994–2010), President of the Senate (2008–2009), Ambassador to Argentina (since 2010), pancreatic cancer.
- Imants Ziedonis, 79, Latvian poet, natural causes.

=== 28 ===
- DJ Ajax, 41, Australian DJ, traffic collision.
- Clarence Atwell Jr., 67, American Tachi Yokuts tribal leader (1967–2009), cancer.
- Theo Bos, 47, Dutch football player and coach, pancreatic cancer.
- William Bennett, 56, American oboist (San Francisco Symphony), cerebral hemorrhage.
- Pedro Treto Cisneros, 73, Mexican baseball commissioner.
- Nancy Cooke de Herrera, 90, American socialite and author.
- Daniel Darc, 53, French singer (Taxi Girl), drug overdose.
- Yo-Yo Davalillo, 81, Venezuelan baseball player (Washington Senators).
- Mosese Fotuaika, 20, New Zealand rugby league player (Wests Tigers), suicide.
- Donald A. Glaser, 86, American physicist and neurobiologist, Nobel Prize in Physics (1960).
- Jean Marcel Honoré, 92, French Roman Catholic prelate, Cardinal of Santa Maria della Salute a Primavalle, Archbishop of Tours (1981–1997).
- Neil McCorkell, 100, English cricketer.
- Moon Mullen, 96, American baseball (Philadelphia Phillies) and basketball player (University of Oregon).
- Bruce Reynolds, 81, British criminal, mastermind of the Great Train Robbery.
- Armando Trovajoli, 95, Italian film composer and pianist.
- Jean Van Steen, 83, Belgian footballer.
- Yulian Voronovskyi, 76, Ukrainian Catholic hierarch, Bishop of Ukrainian Catholic Eparchy of Sambir – Drohobych (1993–2011).
- Robert Weimar, 80, German academic.
