= Ron Edwards =

Ron Edwards or Ronald Edwards may refer to:

- Buster Edwards (1931–1994), British criminal, participant in the Great Train Robbery (1963)
- Ron Edwards (American football) (born 1979), American football defensive tackle
- Ron Edwards (Australian politician) (born 1945), Australian former Labor Party politician from Perth
- Ron Edwards (game designer) (born 1964), American indie RPG game developer
- Ron Edwards (neo-Nazi), Imperial Wizard of the Imperial Klans of America, a white supremacist group
- Ronald A. Edwards (1923–2014), chief of the South African Navy
- Ronald Edwards (cricketer) (1917–2013), South African cricketer
