= Haiyan =

Haiyan may refer to:

== Places ==
- Haiyan, Guangdong (海宴镇), a town in Guangdong
- Haiyan County, Qinghai (海晏县), a county of Haibei Tibetan Autonomous Prefecture, Qinghai
- Haiyan County, Zhejiang (海盐县), a county of Jiaxing, Zhejiang

== People with the given name ==
Haiyan (海燕, a feminine given name of Chinese origin:

- Gu Haiyan (born 1999), Chinese wheelchair fencer
- Qian Haiyan (钱海燕; 1955–2013), Chinese female United Nations Civil Servant
- Xu Haiyan (许海燕; born 1984), Chinese female free style wrestler
- Ye Haiyan (叶海燕; born 1975), female Chinese human rights activist
- Zhou Haiyan (周海燕; born 1990), Chinese female middle-distance runner

Other masculine given names with the same pronunciation but different Chinese characters:

- Hu Haiyan (胡海岩; born 1956), male Chinese academic and president of Beijing Institute of Technology
- Ma Haiyan (馬海晏; 1837–1900), Chinese male Muslim General of the Qing Dynasty

== Other uses ==
- List of storms named Haiyan, the name of several tropical cyclones in the Northwest Pacific Ocean
  - Typhoon Haiyan, an extremely powerful 2013 typhoon in the Philippines
