= Chen Jitang =

Chinese general (1890–1954)

Chen Jitang 陳濟棠
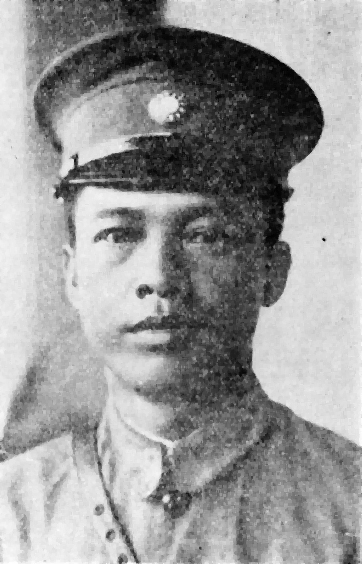
- Chen Jitang
- Nickname: Heavenly King of the South
- Born: January 23, 1890; Fangcheng, Guangxi, Qing dynasty
- Died: November 3, 1954 (aged 64) Taipei, Taiwan
- Buried: Beitou, Taipei, Taiwan
- Allegiance: Republic of China
- Rank: General (five stars)
- Children: Shu-Park Chan, Chung Chau Chan

Chen Jitang (traditional Chinese: 陳濟棠; simplified Chinese: 陈济棠; pinyin: Chén Jìtáng; Wade–Giles: Chên^{2} Chi^{4} Tʻang^{2}; Jyutping: Can4 Zai3 Tong4) (January 23, 1890 – November 3, 1954), also spelled Chen Chi-tang, was a Nationalist China era Chinese military officer and governor. Following his early military career, he became the autonomous governor of Guangdong, developing the province. Becoming its chairman, he established a rival Nationalist government in alliance with the New Guangxi Clique. During the second World War, he participated as a member of the Chinese National Government's Defense and Strategic Commissions. After the war, he was named governor of Hainan Island, and "Strategic Adviser of the President" after the Nationalist government fled to Taiwan.

== Early career ==
Born into a Hakka Chinese family in Fangcheng, Guangxi, he joined the Tongmenghui in 1908 and began serving in the Guangdong Army in 1920, rising from battalion to brigade commander. He was designated commander of the 11th Division within the 4th Army in 1925 and took up the garrison of Qinzhou City in Guangxi in 1926, thus staying in the south during the Northern Expedition. In 1928 he was made Commander of the 4th Route Army.

== Guangdong governor ==
Chen's autonomous control of Guangdong was formalised through the establishment of the Southwest Political Council and the Southwest Headquarters of the Kuomintang Central Executive Committee. Becoming chairman of the government of Guangdong in 1931, he turned against Chiang Kai-shek in the south, establishing a rival Nationalist government. After the arrest and release of Hu Hanmin, he allied with New Guangxi Clique army commanders. Another civil war might have broken out as a result if there had been no September 18 Incident in Shenyang, reminding all sides of the necessity to unite. From 1931 to 1936 he was Commander-in-Chief of the 1st Army Group.

From 1929 to 1936 Chen made tremendous contributions to the province's development, growth and modernization. He paved city streets and built high-rise commercial centers, numerous factories and the first modern bridge across the Pearl River. He oversaw the establishment of a public school system with modern elementary and high schools and prestigious colleges and universities (including the Sun Yat-Sen University). People of the province fondly referred to this period as the Golden Age of Guangdong and called him the Heavenly King of the South (南天王).

== Fifth campaign ==
During Chiang Kai-shek's fifth campaign against Jiangxi Soviet, he named Chen as commander-in-chief of the southern front, commanding over 300,000 troops, or 30% of the 1,000,000 total Nationalist force mobilized against the communist base. Chen's job was to blockade the southern border of the communist base and prevent them from escaping from the south. However, ever suspicious that Chiang's true intent was to take over his territory as Chiang did to the local warlords in Fujian earlier, he participated in the campaign only half-heartedly.

Although 300,000 of his troops were mobilized on paper, he only deployed 180,000, and their deployment was not complete until well after the Chinese Red Army had already passed Chen's territory. Furthermore, Chen made a secret deal with the communists that would ensure the Chinese Red Army would pass through his territory as fast as possible, while his forces would not stop them in the process. This arrangement would ensure the communists would be out of Chen's territory rapidly and that his forces would occupy the region the communists had passed, thus eliminating any excuse for Chiang Kai-shek to send troops into Chen's territory for potential takeover. The deal was carried out successfully and neither Chen nor the communists lost anything.

== Conspiracy ==
In May 1936 Chen's biggest political supporter, Hu Hanmin, died. Chiang thought of weakening Chen further by suggesting ending Guangdong's autonomy. Chen immediately reacted by conspiring with the New Guangxi clique to overthrow Chiang under the pretext of his failure to confront Japanese aggression. This proved to be counterproductive to his efforts, as many of his men saw this as a weakening in the unification against the imminent Imperial Japanese onslaught and defected to the central government, including future ace-fighter pilot in the Second Sino-Japanese War, Cen Zeliu. After months of political maneuvering, bribery, defections and negotiations, the Liangguang incident was resolved peacefully with Chen resigning in July and fleeing to Hong Kong. Guangxi abandoned the plot in September. This is seen as a preview of the more infamous Xi'an Incident in December, which involved the kidnapping of Chiang.

== Late career ==
During World War II Chen was a member of the National Government, Supreme National Defense Commission and Strategic Commission, also taking up the agriculture and forestry ministry of the cabinet. He was named governor of Hainan Island (then part of Guangdong province) after the war. He fled to Taiwan in April 1950, when Hainan came under Communist control, and was named a "Strategic Adviser of the President." He died on November 3, 1954, in Taipei, Taiwan, and is buried in Beitou District.

== Family ==
Chen had three wives and a total of 18 children. Among his children was Shu-Park Chan, professor of electrical engineering at Santa Clara University and founder and first president of International Technological University, both in California's Silicon Valley.

== Sources ==
- Chen Jitang with photo
- The Generals of World War II, Chen Jitang
