= Kezdy =

Kezdy or Kézdy is a Hungarian surname. Notable people with the surname include:

- John Kezdy (died 2023), American singer and member of band The Effigies
- György Kézdy (1936–2013), Hungarian actor
- Pierre Kezdy (1962–2020), American bass player
