= Deng Wei =

Deng Wei may refer to:

- Deng Wei (photographer) (born 1959), Chinese portrait photographer
- Deng Wei (weightlifter) (born 1993), Chinese retired weightlifter
- Deng Wei (actor) (born 1995), Chinese actor
