= Covassi (surname) =

Covassi is an Italian surname. Notable people with the surname include:

- Beatrice Covassi (born 1968), Italian politician
- Claude Covassi (1970–2013), Swiss criminal

== See also ==
- Kumasi
