= John Finbarr Jones =

John Finbarr "Jack" Jones (29 March 1929 – 20 February 2013) was a researcher and scholar of social development, Dean of the Graduate School of Social Work at the University of Denver from 1987 to 1996. He served on the Advisory Board of the United Nations Centre for Regional Development. As director of the social work program at the Chinese University of Hong Kong between 1976 and 1987, he helped recreate the social work field in China. He wrote or edited more than a dozen books on social development, focusing on human security, international conflict resolution, and transitional economies.

== Early life and education ==
Jones was born in Dublin, Ireland, the fourth of five children born to John Jones, a customs and excise agent, and Kathleen O'Brien Jones. He attended boarding school at Clongowes Wood College in County Kildare, until 1948. He then completed his bachelor's degree at National University of Ireland, Dublin (now known as University College Dublin). He joined the Jesuit order after earning his bachelor's degree, and served as a missionary to Hong Kong. He left the priesthood in 1969. After leaving the priesthood, he earned a master's degree in social work at the University of Michigan, and a Master's in public administration, and a PhD in social work at the University of Minnesota. His doctoral dissertation was adapted into his 1976 book Citizens in Service: Volunteers in Social Welfare During the Depression, 1929 – 1941, which he co-wrote with John M. Herrick.

He married Lois McCleskey Jones, in Washington D.C. in 1974. They had two children.

== Professional life, research and scholarship ==
Shortly after Jones completed his doctoral work, the University of Minnesota recruited him to found its School of Social Development, where he was Dean from 1971 to 1976.

Jones then returned to Hong Kong, where he was director of the department of social work at the Chinese University of Hong Kong until 1987. While in Hong Kong, Jones was vice-chairman of the Hong Kong Council of Social Service, and a member of the Hong Kong Advisory Committee on Social Work Training. In 1980, he edited Building China: Studies in Integrated Development, which documented the earliest stages of development in the People's Republic of China following the upheaval of the Cultural Revolution.

Jones was influential in promoting the concept of Social development theory in the field of social work. In 1981, he co-edited Social Development which helped define this approach.

In 1987, he was appointed dean of the Graduate School of Social Work at the University of Denver. Under his leadership the school founded the Bridge Project, which supports education initiatives in Denver's public housing developments. He also helped form a partnership between DU and the All China Youth Federation and the China Youth University for Political Sciences in Beijing, one of the first such collaborations between American and Chinese universities.

After retiring as dean in 1996, he continued to work as a research professor affiliated with the University of Denver's Conflict Resolution Institute and the Graduate School of Social Work. His contributions to the fields of human security and social development included: The Cost of Reform: The Social Aspect of Transitional Economies which he co-edited with Asfaw Kumssa. Jones was named dean emeritus of the University of Denver Graduate School of Social Work in 2004.

Throughout his academic career, Jones served on several international boards and committees, including the Advisory Committee of the United Nations Centre for Regional Development (UNCRD), and the International Council of Social Welfare. Jones was president of the American Humane Association and served on the Colorado Governor's Business Commission on Child Care Financing.

Jones co-ordinated various private and publicly funded research projects, including:

- Research on local social development, transitional economies, and social reforms in Asia and Africa, sponsored by the United Nations Department of Economic and Social Affairs (UNDESA) and United Nations Center for Regional Development (UNCRD).
- Research on social development in China and Hong Kong, funded through the U.N. Social Welfare and Development Center for Asia and the Pacific.
- Research on the chronic mentally ill, funded through the National Institute of Mental Health (NIMH).
- Research on child protective services, funded by the United States Children's Bureau (HHS).
- Program evaluation of rural violence prevention, and community impact studies, funded by the Blandin Foundation.
- Gap analysis study of training, funded by the Ford Family Foundation.
- Immigrants' online database creation and evaluation, funded by First Data / Western Union Foundation.

He also served on several editorial boards, including: Social Development Issues, Regional Development Dialogue, Regional Development Studies, Journal of Social Development in Africa, and Hong Kong Journal of Social Work.

== Selected publications ==
Jones, J.F., Kumssa, A., and Herbert Williams, eds. (2011). Conflict and Human Security in Africa: Kenya in Perspective. New York: Palgrave Macmillan.

Jones, J.F. (2009) Liberty to Live: Human Security and Development. New York: Nova Science Publishers.

Jones, J.F. & Kumssa, A., eds. (2000). The Cost of Reform: The Social Aspect of Transitional Economies. New York: Nova Science Publishers.

Jones, J.F. & Yogo, T. (1995). New Training Design for Local Social Development. Vols. I & II. Nagoya: United Nations Center for Regional Development.

Jones, J.F., Stevenson, K., Cheung, M., & Leung, P. (1995). Call to Competence: Child Protective Services Training and Evaluation. Englewood, CO: American Humane Association, 1995.

Jones, J.F. & Wang Shek (1990). Glossary of Social Work Terms in Chinese and English. Hong Kong: Chinese University Press.

Jones, J.F. & Wang Shek (1983). Research in Social Technology. Taipei: Community Research and Training, ROC. In Chinese.

Jones, J.F., ed. (1981). The Common Welfare. Hong Kong and Manila: Chinese University Press, and United Nations Social Welfare and Development Center for Asia and the Pacific.

Jones, J.F. & Pandey, R.S., eds. (1981). Social Development: Conceptual, Methodological, and Policy Issues. New York: St. Martin's Press; and New Delhi: Macmillan India.

Jones, J.F., ed. (1980). Building China. Hong Kong: Chinese University Press. Distributed in North America by the University of Washington Press.

Jones, J.F. (1979). Education in Depth. Hong Kong: Swindon in association with Hong Kong University.

Jones, J.F. & Li Bik-chi (1978). Social Welfare Administration. Taipei: Chinese Humanities Institute. In Chinese.

Jones, J.F. & Herrick, J.M. (1976). Citizens in Service. East Lansing: Michigan State University Press.
