= Robert Weimar =

German legal scholar and psychologist

Robert Weimar (13 May 1932, in Cologne – 28 February 2013) was a German professor of law and psychologist.

Weimar was particularly concerned with German and European commercial law, and dealt with the psychological and neuro-scientific fundamentals of thinking and decision-making (see neuro-jurisprudence, neuro-administratics, neuro-cognition of decision-finding, legal psychology). His basic scientific position is set out in his work “Psychological Structures of Judicial Decision (German: Psychologische Strukturen richterlicher Entscheidung, 1969, reprinted 1996), which is considered to be a legal psychology classic.

Weimar’s central thesis is that we only have access to reality as communicated by interpretations ("ways of worldmaking").

Weimar was also the founder of the academic field of legal advice (see publications by Weimar, 1986, 1988, 1997, 1998), which became generally established in the law faculties in Germany since the attorney-oriented opening of legal training. Worldwide new were his researching interests in Neuro-Wealth Management (see Weimar (2008), Neuro-Wealth Management - A new Research Landscape. Neuro-Wealth Management - eine neue Forschungslandschaft (German), Hamburg: WiWi-Online AG).

== Life ==
Robert Weimar was born in Cologne. He studied jurisprudence at the Universities of Cologne, Bonn, Heidelberg, Innsbruck, Bern, and Basel, as well as psychology at the University of Basel. He took the First State Law Examination at the Higher Regional Court in Cologne in 1956 and the Second State Law Examination at the State Examination Office for Legal Professions in Düsseldorf in 1960. He took the licentiate examination (lic.iur.utr.) at the University of Basel and received his doctorate as a doctor iuris utriusque in 1965 under Karl Spiro in Basel. In 1967 he earned a doctorate as philosophiae doctor et artium liberalium magister at the University of Basel under Hans Kunz. Under Martin Hautzinger (Tuebingen), Weimar was awarded the state licence to practise psychotherapy (Mainz 1995). Weimar completed subsequent postgraduate studies with the LL.M. (University of Heidelberg) under Erik Jayme and the LL.M. (University of Basel) under Ernst August Kramer (2001). In 2006 Weimar received a doctorate in psychology at the University of Heidelberg under Joachim Funke.

Weimar was delegated to the Federal High Court of Justice in Karlsruhe (Germany) from 1964 to 1968 as a judge of the state of North Rhine-Westphalia after being appointed as a judge at the Regional Court of Cologne in 1961. The appointment as a judge at the Higher Regional Court in Düsseldorf followed in 1968, and from 1970 to 1972 he was delegated to the Federal Constitutional Court of Germany, the highest Court of Germany. From 1974 until his retirement in 1994 Robert Weimar worked as a professor and holder of a chair for civil law, mercantile law and commercial law at the University of Siegen's Department of Law (Germany). He declined offers to professorships in Muenster and Dortmund (Germany). For many years he was an examiner for the First State Law examination at the Higher Regional Court in Düsseldorf. From 1994 to 2006 professor Robert Weimar was a German attorney at law and partner of an internationally renowned law firm in the Consulegis group (Zurich). Weimar, who held various posts as a visiting professor, also lectured at the Universities of Cologne, Karlsruhe, Düsseldorf, Lueneburg, Heidelberg, Krems and Vienna.

He researched and taught at the Ruprecht Karls University of Heidelberg. Weimar was an honorary doctor of the Moscow State Pedagogical University (MPGU). He wrote more than 400 publications on civil law, mercantile law, company law and commercial law, as well as legal theory, neuro-jurisprudence and psychology. Weimar was the editor of the scientific journal series Commercial Law and Economic Constitution of the Institute for Commercial Law and Commercial Legislation in Siegen (Germany), writings on neuro-jurisprudence (Germany), co-editor of the Travaux scientifiques de la Faculté Européenne des Sciences du Foncier Strasbourg (France), co-founder of Theory and Practice – Contributions to the Complete Land Law (Germany), co-editor of Contributions to General Legal and Political Doctrine (Germany), co-founder of the Salzburg Journals on Legal, State and Social Philosophy (Austria), co-editor of the Journals of Legal Psychology (Switzerland) and co-editor of the Journals of Humanity and Happiness Research (Germany). Professor Weimar was a co-founder (1991) and a board member (1991–2008) of the European Institute for Legal Psychology in Zurich. From 2003 he was the research co-ordinator of the Robert Weimar Institute (RWI) in Bonn – Research Institute for Neuro-jurisprudence - Center of Excellence. His lectures cover a wide range of topics.

== Works (selection) ==
- Weimar, R. (2009). Neuro-jurisprudence. Introduction to the New Jurisprudence and Practice of Law (in preparation). Neurojurisprudenz. Einführung in die Neue Rechtswissenschaft und Praxis des Rechts (German). Frankfurt am Main-Berlin-Bern-Bruxelles-New York-Oxford-Vienna: Lang.
- Weimar, R., Schimikowski, P. & Tietze, A. (2009). Civil Law. Bürgerliches Recht (German). 5th edition. UTB. Stuttgart: Lucius & Lucius.
- Weimar, R. (2008). Neuro-Wealth Management - Eine neue Forschungslandschaft (German), Hamburg: WiWi-Online AG.
- Weimar, R. (2008). Unity and Diversity of Legal Theory. Einheit und Vielfalt der Rechtstheorie (German). Berlin: Duncker & Humblot.
- Weimar, R. (2008). Conflict and Decision. Psychological Theories and Concepts Put to the Test. Konflikt und Entscheidung. Psychologische Theorien und Konzepte auf dem Prüfstand (German). Frankfurt am Main-Berlin-Bern-Bruxelles-New York-Oxford-Vienna: Lang.
- Weimar, R. (2008). The Subcontract – The Outsourcing Contract. Subunternehmervertrag – Outsourcingvertrag (German). 3rd edition. Frankfurt am Main: Verlag Recht & Wirtschaft.
- Jakob, R., Usteri, M. & Weimar, R. (Eds.). (2006). Law & Psychology. Applied Law as the Object of Qualitative and Quantitative View. Festschrift for Manfred Rehbinder. Recht & Psychologie. Gelebtes Recht als Objekt qualitativer und quantitativer Betrachtung (German). Bern: Lang.
- Weimar, R. & Leidig, G. (2002). Evolution, Culture and Legal System. Evolution, Kultur und Rechtssystem (German). Frankfurt am Main-Berlin-Bern-Bruxelles-New York-Oxford-Vienna: Lang.
- Weimar, R. & Grote, K.-P. (Eds.). (1998). Crisis Management in the Limited Company. Krisenmanagement in der GmbH (German). Wiesbaden: Gabler.
- Weimar, R. (1996). Psychological Structures of Judicial Decision. Psychologische Strukturen richterlicher Entscheidung (German). Reprint. Bern: Staempfli.
- Jakob, R., Usteri, M. & Weimar, R. (Eds.). (1995). Psyche – Law – Society. Psyche – Recht – Gesellschaft (German). Bern-Munich: Staempfli / C.H. Beck.
- Weimar, R. (1993). Trust Law. Commentary. Treuhandgesetz. Kommentar (German). Stuttgart: Kohlhammer.
- Weimar, R. & Schimikowski, P. (1993). Fundamentals of Commercial Law. Grundzüge des Wirtschaftsrechts (German). 2nd edition. Munich: Vahlen.
- Weimar, R. (1992). Post Privatisation Problems. Nachprivatisierungsprobleme (German). Cologne: Kommunikationsforum.
- Oehlinger, T. & Weimar, R. (Eds.). (1991). The European Regional Planning Charter. Die Europäische Raumordnungscharta (German). Frankfurt am Main-Bern-New York-Paris: Lang.
- Straube, M. & Weimar, R. (Eds.). (1984). The Legal Practitioner and Technology between Science and Practice. Jurist und Technik zwischen Wissenschaft und Praxis (German). Festschrift for Josef Kuehne's 60th birthday. Vienna: Orac.
- Frohberg, G., Kimminich, O. & Weimar, R. (Eds.). (1979). Law – Environment – Society. Recht – Umwelt – Gesellschaft (German). Festschrift for Alfred Pikalo. Berlin: Schweitzer.
- Weimar, R. (Ed.). (1978). Festschrift for Franz Schad's 70th birthday (German). Düsseldorf: Verlag Deutsche Wohnungswirtschaft.
- Weimar, R. (1977). Care and Material Equality. To the Commitment of the Legislator to Constitutional Obligations in the Field of Pension Policy. Versorgung und materiale Gleichheit. Zur Bindung des Gesetzgebers an verfassungsrechtliche Handlungspflichten im Bereich der Rentenpolitik (German). Ueberlingen: Schack von Wittenau.
- Weimar, R. (1967). Explorations on the Problem of Product Liability. A Contribution to Sociological Legal Research. Basel Studies on Jurisprudence, Vol. 79. Untersuchungen zum Problem der Produkthaftung. Ein Beitrag zur soziologischen Rechtsforschung. Basler Studien zur Rechtswissenschaft, Bd. 79 (German). Basel: Helbing & Lichtenhahn.

== Anniversary publications ==
- Legal Theory and Legislation. Festschrift for Robert Weimar. Rechtstheorie und Gesetzgebung. Festschrift für Robert Weimar (German). Edited by Ilmar Tammelo & Erhard Mock. Frankfurt am Main-Bern-New York 1986: Lang.
- Juristic Fields of Operation and Interdisciplinarity in the Works of Robert Weimar. Bibliographical Discourses on the Occasion of his 65th birthday. Juristische Operationsfelder und Interdisziplinarität bei Robert Weimar. Bibliographische Streifzüge zu seinem 65. Geburtstag. Festschrift. (German). Edited by Michael W. Fischer, Hans Lenk & Paul Trappe. Frankfurt am Main-Berlin-Bern-Bruxelles-New York-Vienna 2000: Lang.
