= B. G. Dyess =

American politician

Member of the Louisiana State Senate
- In office 1996–2000

Personal details
- Born: Bernice G. Dyess; August 16, 1922 Rapides Parish, Louisiana, U.S.
- Died: February 18, 2013 (aged 90) Alexandria, Louisiana, U.S.
- Party: Democratic

Bernice G. Dyess (August 16, 1922 – February 18, 2013) was an American politician. A member of the Democratic Party, he served in the Louisiana State Senate from 1996 to 2000.

== Life and career ==
Dyess was born in Rapides Parish, Louisiana, the son of Josie Dyess and Sarah Matilda Smith. He was a Baptist minister in numerous churches in Central Louisiana. He served in the Rapides Parish School Board in 1948, and was the registrar of voters in his hometown for 24 years.

Dyess served in the Louisiana State Senate from 1996 to 2000.

== Death ==
Dyess died on February 18, 2013, at the Naomi Heights Nursing Home in Alexandria, Louisiana, at the age of 90.
