= Frank Farrelly =

American psychotherapist

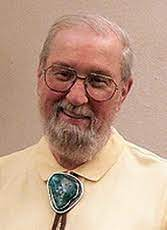
- Born: 26 August 1931
- Died: 10 February 2013
- Education: Catholic University of America
- Occupation: Psychotherapist
- Employers: Mendota Mental Health Institute; University of Wisconsin–Madison
- Scientific career
- Workplaces: Mendota Mental Health Institute; University of Wisconsin–Madison

Frank Farrelly (26 August 1931 – 10 February 2013) was a therapist best known for the 1974 book Provocative Therapy, which advocated radical (and sometimes humorous) therapeutic moves intended to jolt the client out of his current mindset.

== Biography ==
Farrelly held a master's degree in Social Work from The Catholic University Of America and was a member of the Academy of Certified Social Workers. For many years he was a clinical professor at the University of Wisconsin School of Social Work and an assistant clinical professor in the Department of Psychiatry at the University of Wisconsin Medical School. As a social worker in the 1960s he developed his "provocative" theory, Provocative Therapy is a system of psychotherapy in which - having established a foundation of compassion, and with the client's permission - the therapist plays the devil's advocate. They will side with the negative half of the client's ambivalence toward his life's goals, his relationships, work, and the structures within which he lives. Client examples include working with obese patients with their weight and eating habits. His methods, though controversial, have attracted worldwide attention. In 2013 Frank Farrelly's son Tim Farrelly passed with Frank's instruction the Frank Farrelly archive to Nick Kemp who continues to promote Farrelly's classic Provocative Therapy as well as his own Provocative Change Works approach in the US, Asia and Europe.
