= John Hamber =

United States Virgin Islands sailor

Personal information
- Full name: John Werge Hamber
- Born: May 6, 1931; Oakland, California, United States
- Died: February 1, 2013 (aged 81); Surprise, Arizona, United States

Sport
- Sport: Sailing

John Werge Hamber (May 6, 1931 – February 1, 2013) was a sailor who represented the United States Virgin Islands. He competed at the 1968 Summer Olympics and the 1972 Summer Olympics.
