= Mikhail Pakhomov =

Russian politician

Mikhail Pakhomov (born 1976) was a Russian politician and member of Lipetsk city council. He was murdered in 2013. His body was found in a barrel full of cement.

== Death ==
Pakhomov's death was originally ordered by the former state-utilities of official Yevgeny Kharitonov, who was later arrested. The killing was carried out by 7 men, who also were arrested. The best explanation for Pakhomov's death is for his debts that he owed to Kharitonov.
