= Shu-Park Chan =

Chinese-American electrical engineer (1929–2013)

- Born: 1929; Canton, China
- Died: February 22, 2013 (aged 83–84); Hong Kong
- Education: Virginia Military Institute; University of Illinois
- Occupations: Electrical engineer, professor
- Father: Chen Jitang

Shu-Park Chan (1929 – February 22, 2013) was a Chinese-born electrical engineer who served for many years as a professor at Santa Clara University and went on to found International Technological University and serve as its first president.

== Early life and education ==
Chan grew up in Canton, China, where his father, Chen Jitang (a Guangxi ancestry), was a warlord and the leader of Guangdong province from 1929 to 1936. His father had three wives; Shu-Park Chan was the tenth of the 18 children born to the family.

Like his father, Shu-Park Chan served in the Chinese Nationalist army in the late 1940s. After the founding of the People's Republic of China, his father fled to Taiwan and sent the 19-year-old Shu-Park to the United States to obtain an education. His father hoped that his son could use the fruits of his western education to benefit the education system of his native country. In the U.S., Chan studied engineering at Virginia Military Institute and the University of Illinois at Urbana–Champaign, receiving a Ph.D. at Illinois in 1962.

== Santa Clara University ==
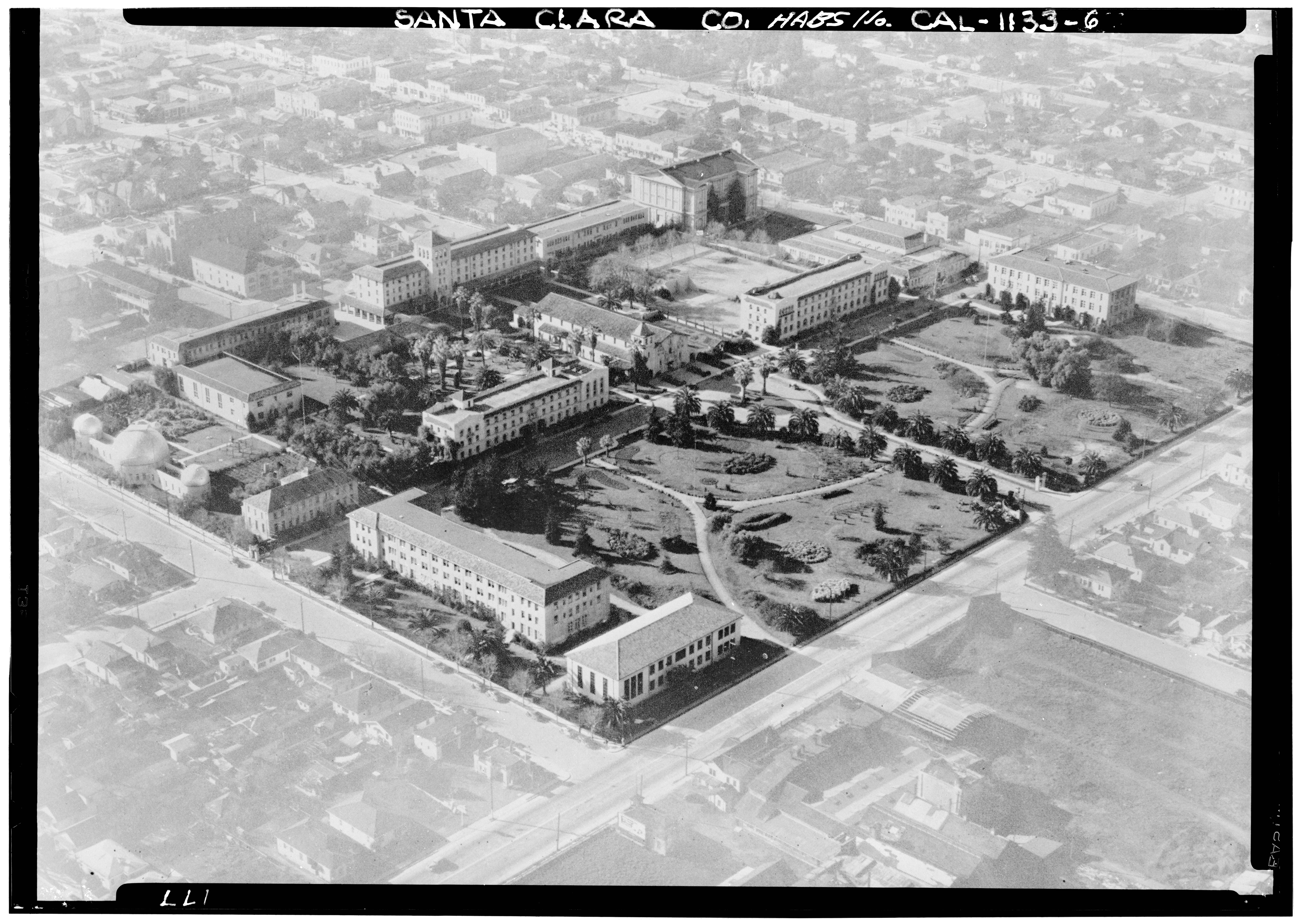
Santa Clara University campus in 1940.

After obtaining his Ph.D., Chan joined the faculty of Santa Clara University in California. He went on to become a U.S. citizen in 1965 and he taught electrical engineering at Santa Clara for over 30 years, serving for a time as interim dean of the university's School of Engineering.

At Santa Clara University, he was a mentor to many Ph.D. candidates and personally taught more than 10,000 students. His work as an educator contributed significantly to the growth of Silicon Valley as a center for technology. His research specialty was in the area of graph theory and network topology, a field that connects electrical engineering with computer science, and Ph.D. students he mentored were to become founders or co-founders of companies such as Cadence Design Systems, Atmel, Microelectronics Technologies, and Oak Technology. In 2009, an article in AsianWeek stated that "over 80% of all microprocessors designed and developed within the last 20 years have been created or touched by technology generated from Professor Chan's students."

Chan was the author or co-author of several engineering books. He wrote the 1972 textbook Analysis of Linear Networks and systems: A Matrix-Oriented Approach with Computer Applications (Addison-Wesley) together with his brothers Shu-Yun and Shu-Gar Chan; they dedicated the book to their father.

== Later career ==
In 1984, during a period when China was establishing cooperative ventures with Western countries, Chan took a leave of absence from Santa Clara University and moved to Shenzhen, China, to establish a university there. Chinese authorities had allocated 500 acres (200 ha) of land there for the school, which was to be called the Chinese Experimental University.

Chan had obtained necessary permissions from the U.S. and Chinese governments, as well as pledges of financial support from Chinese authorities and U.S. companies. He said the school would be China's "first western-style university since the People's Republic was founded." A few weeks before construction was scheduled to start, the project was cancelled due to changes in the Chinese government, leading Chan to return to the United States.

Chan did not give up on his quest to start an educational institution after the failure of his Shenzhen initiative. In 1992, he retired from Santa Clara University with the intention of starting a new university in Silicon Valley that could offer graduate engineering education "in the shortest time possible, at the lowest cost." He opened International Technological University two years later, in 1994, and served as its president until retiring in 2010.

In his final years, Chan had Alzheimer's disease. He died in Hong Kong on February 22, 2013, the same day that International Technological University was accredited by the Western Association of Schools and Colleges.

== Personal life ==
Chan was married to Stella Chan. They had two children. Their son, Yau-Gene Chan, succeeded his father as president of International Technological University.
