= Rushdi Said =

Egyptian geologist

- Born: May 12, 1920; Shoubra, Cairo, Egypt
- Died: February 8, 2013 (aged 92); Falls Church, Virginia, United States
- Scientific career
- Fields: geology
- Workplaces: Cairo University, Doctorate from Harvard University, Professor of Geology, Cairo University and Chairman of the Board of the Egyptian Mining and Geological Research Organization

Rushdi Said (Arabic: رشدي سعيد) (May 12, 1920 – February 8, 2013) was an Egyptian-American scientist. He was educated at Cairo, Zurich, and Harvard Universities. A professor of geology, he was the chairman of the board of the Egyptian Mining and Geological Research Organization (1968–1977). He played a major role in the development of this organization with the new mining discoveries that enabled Egypt to compensate for the various mines lost after the occupation of Sinai.

He had the opportunity to be involved in politics in the 1960s and 1970s as a member of the People's Assembly and also in the International Parliamentary Union. Rushdi was unique in choosing to specialize in the subject of geological Egypt. He wrote a book on Egypt's geology which won the admiration of the world's scientists and became a recognized authority on a local level and globally. He was also an expert in irrigation. He has written books and articles on mining and agriculture and irrigation in Egypt and the region in general. His main project, to which he has devoted years of his life, is the renaissance of Egypt and the development of the Egyptian population. He served as a professor at Cairo University from 1950 until 1968, and was the manager of the Mining and Geological Research Institute in the period from 1968 - 1977.

Rushdi was honored by Egyptian President Gamal Abdel Nasser in 1962, who awarded him the Order of Sciences and Arts, First Class. He was also awarded the 2003 leadership of the American Association of Petroleum Geology, in recognition of his scientific work on the geology of Egypt and the Middle East, which opened up new horizons for the application of this science in the search for oil in the region.

== Biography ==
Said was born in 1920 in Elkolali, a district of Shoubra, Cairo, in a middle-class family with roots from Assiut. He studied at Cairo University's Faculty of Science, where he graduated in 1941 with honors then was appointed as a lecturer in the same college. He began teaching geology in the faculty after returning from a scientific study in the University of Zurich, Switzerland, in 1951. He lived in Washington, D.C. from 1981 until his death.

== The diversion of the Nile Valley ==
This is a Rushdi Said project proposing the reconstruction of the vast western desert of Egypt and transferring it to a useful territory. The draft, Said has suggested, is to link the Western Sahara with the Nile Valley to a network of transport and communications. It is proposed to stay within the area north of the Western Sahara and is bordered by the Mediterranean Sea from the north and Qattara Depression and the Siwa Oasis from the south This vast area has a mild climate, flat topography and proximity to areas of energy of natural gas and centres of urbanization and the sea that can be used in the cooling water in many industries.

== Books ==
- Foraminifera of the northern Red Sea. 1949
- The river Nile by Rushdi Said

(Pergamon, 1993)

- The geological survey of Egypt, 1896-1971 by Rushdi Said

(Ministry of Industry, Petroleum and Mineral Wealth, Egyptian Geological Survey and Mining Authority, 1971)

- Science and politics in Egypt by Rushdi Said

(American University in Cairo Press, 2004) )

- Explanatory notes to accompany the geological map of Egypt

(Ministry of Industry, Petroleum, and Mineral Wealth, Geological Survey of Egypt and Mining Authority, 1971)

- Subsurface geology of Cairo area 1975
- The geology of Egypt.1962

(Elsevier Pub. Co.

- al- Ḥaqīqah wa-al-wahm fī al-wāqiʻ al-Miṣrī

(Dār al-Hilāl, 1996)

- The geological evolution of the River Nile

(Springer-Verlag, 1981)

- Riḥlat ʻumr

(Dār al-Hilāl, 2000)
