= Gustaf Adolf Neumann =

Gustav Adolf Neumann
- Born: 1924
- Died: February 18, 2013; Klosterneuburg, Austria
- Citizenship: Austrian
- Known for: activism against miscarriages of justice

Gustaf Adolf Jakob Neumann (1924–18 February 2013; Klosterneuburg, Austria) was an Austrian investigative journalist and newspaper editor known for his activism against miscarriages of justice during the 1950s.

== Education ==
He finished his "junior grade" at the missionary school in Dachsberg, "meant to act as missionary for the Oblates of St. Francis de Sales in Namibia. However, these plans failed because of "nazi disputes about the counterreformation of Ferdinand II. and because of Nazi opposition against the plea for tolerance by Joseph II." (?). The missionary school was closed then by the NS–Stillhaltekommissar (in English maybe "NS-'keep still'-commissioners).

Neumann finished his senior grades at the school of Benedictine monks in Kremsmünster and Schottenstift in Vienna, where he also got his "school-leaving certificate".

== Poetry ==
His first poetry readings were given in 1943 and 1944. However, early lyrics were released by the Edmund Huyke publisher in Leipzig, yet were destroyed during the Second World War. ("Critics of the press in Moravia, Bohemian Austria and upper Austria praised Neumann's work with headlines such as 'A new Star in the sky of poets'").

== Work as publisher ==
In 1945, Neumann founded Hausruck publishing house in Grieskirchen. Since 1945, with 21 years, he began to publish the weekly paper Echo der Heimat (in English maybe "echo of the homeland") for upper Austria and soon after for every federal state. That is when he began to report about Nazi concentration camps and political crimes.

Afterward, Neumann was an owner and manager of book- and offsetprinters for over 30 years.

== Political life ==
He joined the political party Verband der Unabhängigen ("formation of independents"). With 24 years he was at that time the youngest party leader of Austria, yet not electable because of his age. However, Neumann has been overthrown by radicalized groups.

By his publishing activity, Neumann helped to rehabilitate 13 wrongly convicted men (among them Rudolf Rechberger, Huberth Ranneth und Josef Auer). He also saved innumerable farm workers and people affected by liabilities they couldn't afford from injustice and arbitrariness.

== Later years ==
Newman acted as the President of the supervisory board of the Casinos Austria International Holding plc. In June 2007, he became the honorary president of the organization.

Neumann was "decorated" with the title of "professor" and the "great golden sign of honor for accomplishments for the state of lower Austria" ("given" by Erwin Pröll ?). He also authored many articles and reports. Neumann was the founder of the Gustaf Adolf Neumann Stiftung Tiere-Rechte ("Gustaf Adolf Neumann foundation for animal rights"). He also worked as a consultant in architectural and graphical matters.

He was a father to 7 children and was widowed twice during his lifetime.
