= Benedict Ashley =

American Catholic priest and philosopher (1915–2013)

Benedict M. Ashley, O.P. (born Winston Norman Ashley, May 3, 1915 – February 23, 2013), was an American Catholic priest, theologian and philosopher who had a major influence on 20th century Catholic theology and ethics in America through his writing, teaching, and consulting with the United States Conference of Catholic Bishops. He was a member of the Dominican Order.

Author of 19 books, Ashley was a major exponent of the River Forest Thomism. Health Care Ethics, which he co-authored in 1975 and now in its fifth edition, continues to be a fundamental text in the field of Catholic medical ethics. Ashley taught at numerous institutions and was an active teacher, consultant, and author.

He was a faculty member of the Institute for Advanced Physics, a physics research and educational organization reintegrating the foundational principles given directly through our senses into the heart of modern science, from 2003 till his death. He called the Institute for Advanced Physics "the first and only institution addressing this problem [the disintegration of secular and religious culture] at its core by integrating the proper philosophical depth into the heart of modern science."

== Life ==
As a young man, Ashley was a committed atheist and communist. As an undergraduate he studied under Mortimer Adler and Robert Maynard Hutchins at the University of Chicago and there received his master's degree in Comparative Literature and was a graduate assistant to Adler. For a time a member of the Young Communist League and then of the Trotskyist Socialist Workers Party, through his study under Adler of the works of St. Thomas Aquinas he was baptized in the Catholic Church and received his Doctorate in political science at the University of Notre Dame. He then entered the Order of Preachers (Dominicans) in which he was ordained in 1948. He received a second Ph.D. in Philosophy and the Master's in Sacred Theology, the latter a post-doctoral degree conferred by an international commission of the Order of Preachers. He has also received an honorary doctorate from Aquinas Institute of Theology in St. Louis, MO, of which he was president from 1963 to 1969. Also he has been Professor of Theology at the Pontifical John Paul II Institute for Studies in Marriage and Family, Washington, D.C, affiliate of the Lateran University, Rome, and for his work there was honored with the medal Pro Ecclesia et Pontifice conferred by John Paul II. He was a Visiting Lecturer in Humanities at the University of Chicago (1999). He was for some years in the post-Vatican II period a consultant in moral theology for the Committee on Doctrine and Pastoral Practice of the U.S. Conference of Catholic Bishops in their 3rd edition of the Ethical and Religious Directives for Catholic Health Care Facilities. Until his death in 2013, Fr. Ashley was an emeritus professor of Moral Theology at Aquinas Institute of Theology, St. Louis and an associate professor at the Center for Health Care Ethics, Medical School of St. Louis University. During 2001-2002 he was visiting lecturer at the Institute for the Psychological Sciences and the Pope John Paul II Cultural Center, Washington DC. He was formerly a Senior Fellow of the National Catholic Bioethics Center, Philadelphia in its first years.

=== Degrees ===
- Undergraduate and M.A. (Comparative Literature), University of Chicago, 1937 (Comparative Literature, Phi Beta Kappa
- Ph.D. (Political Science) University of Notre Dame, 1941
- S.T.Lr. (Theology), Aquinas Institute, River Forest, IL; Ph.D. (Philosophy) Aquinas Institute, 1949
- post-doctoral Master of Sacred Theology (University of St. Thomas Aquinas, Rome) 1979
- Honorary Doctor of Theology, Aquinas Institute, 2001.

== Publications ==
- How Science Enriches Theology (coauthored with John Deely, South Bend: St. Augustine's Press, 2012).
- "Barefoot Journeying" Autobiography of Benedict M. Ashley, O.P. 2013.
- "Albert the Great - The Valiant Woman." Translated and Introduction by Benedict M. Ashley, O.P. and Dominic Holtz, O.P., 2013.
- "Meditation on the Luminous Mysteries." Benedict M. Ashley, O.P. (Staten Island: Alba House, 2009).
- "Health Care Ethics: A Catholic Theological Analysis." Benedict M. Ashley, O.P., Jean deBlois, C.S.J, Kevin D. O'Rourke, O.P., (Washington: Georgetown University Press, 2006).
- The Ashley Reader: Redeeming Reason (Naples, FL: Sapientia Press, 2006).
- Benedict Ashley (2006). The Way toward Wisdom: An Interdisciplinary and Contextual Introduction to Metaphysics. Houston: University of Notre Dame Press for the Center of Thomistic Studies. OCLC 609421317.
- Choosing a Worldview and Value System: An Ecumenical Apologetics (Staten Island, NY: Alba House, 2000).
- Living the Truth in Love: A Biblical Introduction to Moral Theology (Staten Island, NY: Alba House, 1996).
- Spiritual Direction in the Dominican Tradition, (New York: Paulist Press, 1995).
- Thomas Aquinas: Selected Spiritual Writings co-authored with Matthew Rzechowski, O.P. (Hyde Park, NY: New City Press,1994).
- "Justice in the Church: Gender and Participation," The McGivney Lectures, 1992, Washington, DC: The Catholic University of America Press, 1996.
- Theologies of the Body: Humanist and Christian (St. Louis: Pope John Center, 1985.Second edition, with a new introductory chapter has been published (1996) by the Pope John Center (Braintree, Mass, 1996, now National Catholic Bioethics Center, Boston.
- The Dominicans (Collegeville, MN: The Liturgical Press/Michael Glazier:1991)
- Ethics of Health Care: An Introductory Textbook (short version of Health Care Ethics below) (co-author with Kevin D. O'Rourke,) 1st ed. 1986) and then with Washington, DC: Georgetown University Press, 2nd ed., 1994, 3rd. 2002.
- Thy Kingdom Come! An Overview of Catholic Social Doctrine, Dubuque, IA (Archdiocese of Dubuque, Telegraph-Herald Press, 1976). (Thesis: The teaching of the Church on social justice is extensive, consistent, and well reflects current problems.)
- The Challenge of Christ (coauthor textbook series, 3 vols., Dubuque, IA: Priory Press). 1965? (Thesis: Catechism is best taught by working from Bible stories.)
- St.Thomas and the Liberal Arts (co-authored with Pierre Conway, O.P., Washington, DC: The Thomist Press, 1959. (Thesis: The history of the liberal arts shows how important they have always been for our culture.)
- Aristotle's Sluggish Earth (Philosophy doctoral dissertation) River Forest, IL: Albertus Magnus Lyceum, 1958). Previously in The New Scholasticism, 32, 2 (Part I: Problematics of the De Caelo, 32 (1958), pp. 1–31; Part II, Media of Demonstration, pp. 202–234; the biological part was never published. (Thesis: Aristotle's fundamental analysis of the fundamental principles of natural science is sound and should be follow today, since it does not depend on his two fundamental factual (a) geocentric eternity of the universe and (b) the heart rather than the brain as the principal organ of the animal body)
- The Arts of Learning and Communication (Chicago, Priory Press, 1957). Now available (Thesis: Liberal education at the highschool level can even today best be based on the traditional trivium and quadrivium.)
- The Liberal Education of the Christian Person (editor and co-author) (Chicago, 1954). (Thesis; The curriculum of Catholic of education leading up to the bachelor's degree should be based on the liberal arts and the Thomistic division of the sciences.)
- Science in Synthesis: Report of the Summer Session of the Albertus Magnus Lyceum, River Forest, Ill, 1952 (co-author and editor), (Albertus Lyceum Publications, River Forest, 1953). Thesis: Science Philosophy and Theology must enrich each other through dialogue.
- The Theory of Natural Slavery (Notre Dame, dissertation, Anne Arbor, MI, 1941). (Thesis: Slavery as defined by Aristotle is a lack of liberal education making it impossible to participate in the free decisions of a state.)
