= Equestrian statue of Queen Wilhelmina =

Coordinates: 52.36917°N 4.89229°E

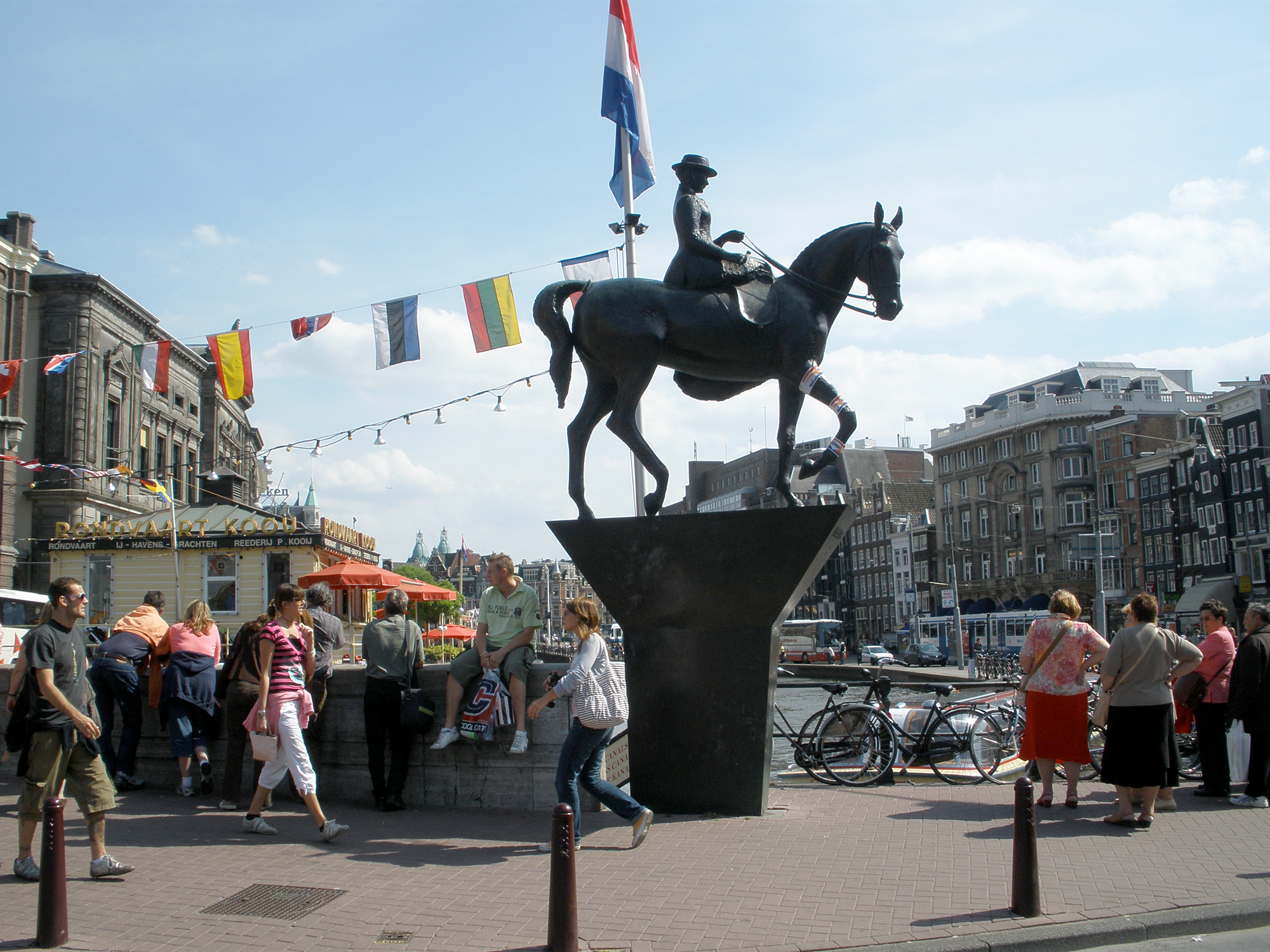
Equestrian statue of Queen Wilhelmina on Rokin

The equestrian statue of Queen Wilhelmina in Amsterdam is located on Rokin street, at the corner with Langebrugsteeg alley. The statue of Queen Wilhelmina of the Netherlands was sculpted in bronze by Theresia R. van der Pant.

The statue was commissioned by the Amsterdam Contact Group of Women's Organisations in 1964. The money was provided by the population of Amsterdam.

The initial commission envisaged an effigy of the queen seated behind a microphone, addressing the Dutch people on the wartime Radio Oranje programme of the BBC European Service, symbolising Wilhelmina's status as "war queen". Theresia van der Pant was not enthusiastic about this idea, arguing that several recent statues portrayed the elder, plucky Wilhelmina, such as Charlotte van Pallandt's in Rotterdam. Also, Van der Pant was most experienced sculpting animals. She therefore decided on a statue of the younger queen, riding horseback. Wilhelmina's daughter Queen Juliana assisted Van der Pant, suggesting what clothes Wilhelmina should wear.

At first Damrak street was considered as the location for the statue. Because the sculpture turned out larger than expected, and it was not intended as a place of remembrance and therefore could possibly clash with the National Monument on nearby Dam Square, it was unveiled on Rokin street in 1972.
