= José Gustavo Angel Ramírez =

Colombian bishop (1934–2013)

José Gustavo Angel Ramírez M.X.Y.
- Vicar Apostolic of Mitú
- Church: Catholic Church
- See: Apostolic Vicariate of Mitú
- In office: 19 June 1989 – 17 September 2009
- Predecessor: Belarmino Correa Yepes
- Successor: Medardo de Jesús Henao del Río
- Other post: Titular Bishop of Vescera (1989-2013)

Orders
- Ordination: 7 September 1958
- Consecration: 22 July 1989 by Angelo Acerbi

Personal details
- Born: 10 March 1934 La Ceja, Antioquia Department, Colombia
- Died: 23 February 2013 (aged 78)

José Gustavo Angel Ramírez (10 March 1934 – 23 February 2013) was a Colombian Catholic bishop.

Ordained to the priesthood on 7 September 1958, Angel Ramírez was named bishop of the Apostolic Vicariate of Mitú, Colombia on 19 June 1989 and retired on 17 September 2009.
