= Graduate School of Social Work at the University of Denver =

US university unit in Denver, Colorado, US

Coordinates: 39.677680°N 104.964924°W

The Graduate School of Social Work at the University of Denver
- Established: 1931
- Parent institution: University of Denver
- Faculty: 34
- Location: Denver, Colorado, United States
- Website: Official website

The Graduate School of Social Work at the University of Denver (GSSW), is the oldest graduate school of social work in the Rocky Mountain Region. Founded in 1931, GSSW enrolls approximately 425 students in the Master of Social Work degree program and approximately 30 students in its doctor of social work program. The program is accredited by the Council on Social Work Education (CSWE), a specialized accrediting body recognized by the Council on Post-Secondary Accreditation. The accreditation has been continuous since 1933.

== History ==
The school was founded in 1931 as a joint effort between The University of Denver's Department of Allied Social Services and community agencies such as Community Chest and the Denver chapter of the American Association of Social Workers (which later became National Association of Social Workers). Continuously accredited by the American Association of Professional Schools of Social Work since 1933, the program became known as the Graduate School of Social Work in 1942. In 1968, the school established one of the first doctoral programs in social work. In 2006, the Institute for Human Animal Connection was founded, the first institute of its type housed within a school of social work.

== Deans of the School ==
- (Grace) Eleanor Kimble - 1931-1934 - Founding Director
- Florence Hustinpiller - 1934 - 1947
- Emil M. Sunley ("Sun") - 1947 - 1971 - 1st Dean/3rd Director
- Kenneth W. Kindelsperger - 1971-1978
- Everne McCummings - 1978 - 1985 - 1st person of color to serve as GSSW Dean, 1st African American to serve as dean at the University of Denver
- Katherine "Kay" Vail - 1985-1987 - Acting Dean
- John "Jack" F. Jones- 1987-1996
- Catherine Foster Alter - 1996-2006
- James Herbert Williams - 2010 - 2016
- Amanda Moore McBride - 2016—2023
- Kim Bender - 2023 - Acting Dean
- Lisa Reyes Mason - 2023-2024 - Interim Dean
- Henrika McCoy - effective June 15, 2024

== Rankings and reputation ==
As of 2024, it is ranked tied for 12th out of 319 schools for social work in the United States by U.S. News & World Report.

== See also ==
List of social work schools
