= Mike Schwartz (activist) =

Pro-life activist (1950 – 2013)

Michael Schwartz (1950 – February 3, 2013) was an American leader in the United States anti-abortion movement, a co-founder of the March for Life, and a founding chairman of a Planned Parenthood watchdog organization named Life Decisions International. In 1995, he was named executive director of the House's Family Congressional Caucus. He also worked as the vice president of Concerned Women for America. He was a member of Operation Rescue and Chief of Staff to then-Representative Tom Coburn until 2000; Schwartz served in the same role from 2004 to 2012, still under Coburn, who had become a Senator.

== Biography ==
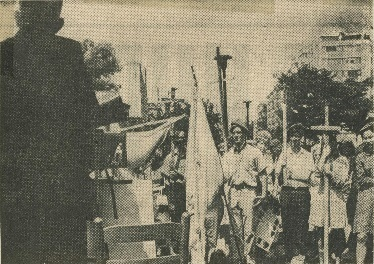
Schwartz (fourth from right) listening to L Brent Bozell Jr speak at the rally at GW Circle on June 6, 1970

Schwartz was raised in Philadelphia in a family that, in his own words, suffered from “social pathologies — drug abuse, welfare dependency, illegitimacy."

In 1969, at the University of Dallas, he co-founded Sons of Thunder, "one of the first pro-life groups in America". The group invaded an abortion clinic, and its members were arrested.

In 2011, Schwartz was diagnosed with amyotrophic lateral sclerosis (ALS), a progressive neurodegenerative disease that affects motor neurons in the brain and spinal cord. He died on February 3, 2013, surrounded by his wife, children, and grandchildren.
