= Ozzie Sweet =

American photographer

Ozzie Sweet (Oscar Cowan Corbo; September 10, 1918 in Stamford, Connecticut – February 20, 2013 in York Harbor, Maine) was a sports photographer whose best work in photography was in creating an image, not capturing one. According to the New York Times, "Sweet's signature images from the 1940s through the 1950s and into the 1960s, many in the fierce hues of increasingly popular color film that emulated the emergent Technicolor palette of American movies, helped define — visually, anyway — an era."
