= Earle Howard (politician) =

American law enforcement officer and legislator

Earle Howard (September 6, 1926 – February 15, 2013) was an American law enforcement officer and legislator.

== Biography ==
Born in Kokomo, Indiana, Howard served in the United States Army during World War II. He then worked for the Kokomo Police Department. Howard then worked for the Howard County, Indiana Sheriff Department and served as sheriff. Howard served in the Indiana House of Representatives from 1986 to 1994.
