= Donald Thompson (fencer) =

American fencer (1928–2013)

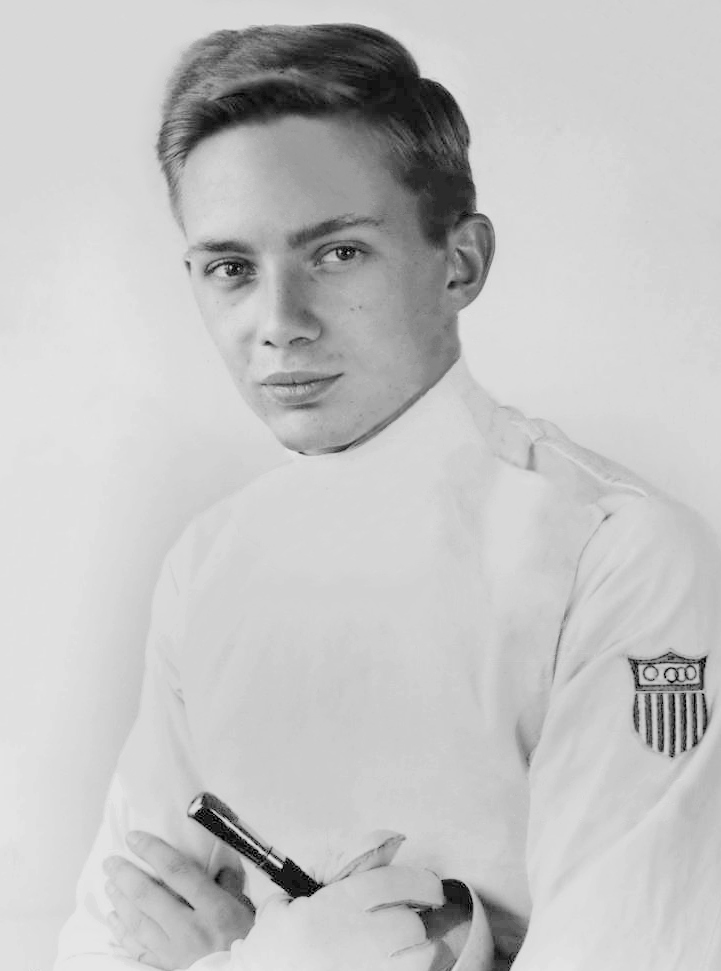
- Thompson in 1948

Personal information
- Born: Donald Gilkey Thompson; January 15, 1928 Oakland, California, U.S.
- Died: February 26, 2013 (aged 85)

Sport
- Sport: Fencing

Donald Gilkey Thompson (January 15, 1928 – February 26, 2013) was an American fencer. He competed in the team épée event at the 1948 Summer Olympics, but failed to reach the final.

Thompson won the national épée title in 1953. He studied English at the University of Chicago and later headed the department of English at Wilbur Wright College in Chicago. He also established the English for Credit Program in Chicago. Thompson was a long-term member of the Art Institute of Chicago and a big admirer of the Lyric Opera of Chicago.
