= Hugh E. Wild =

United States Air Force general

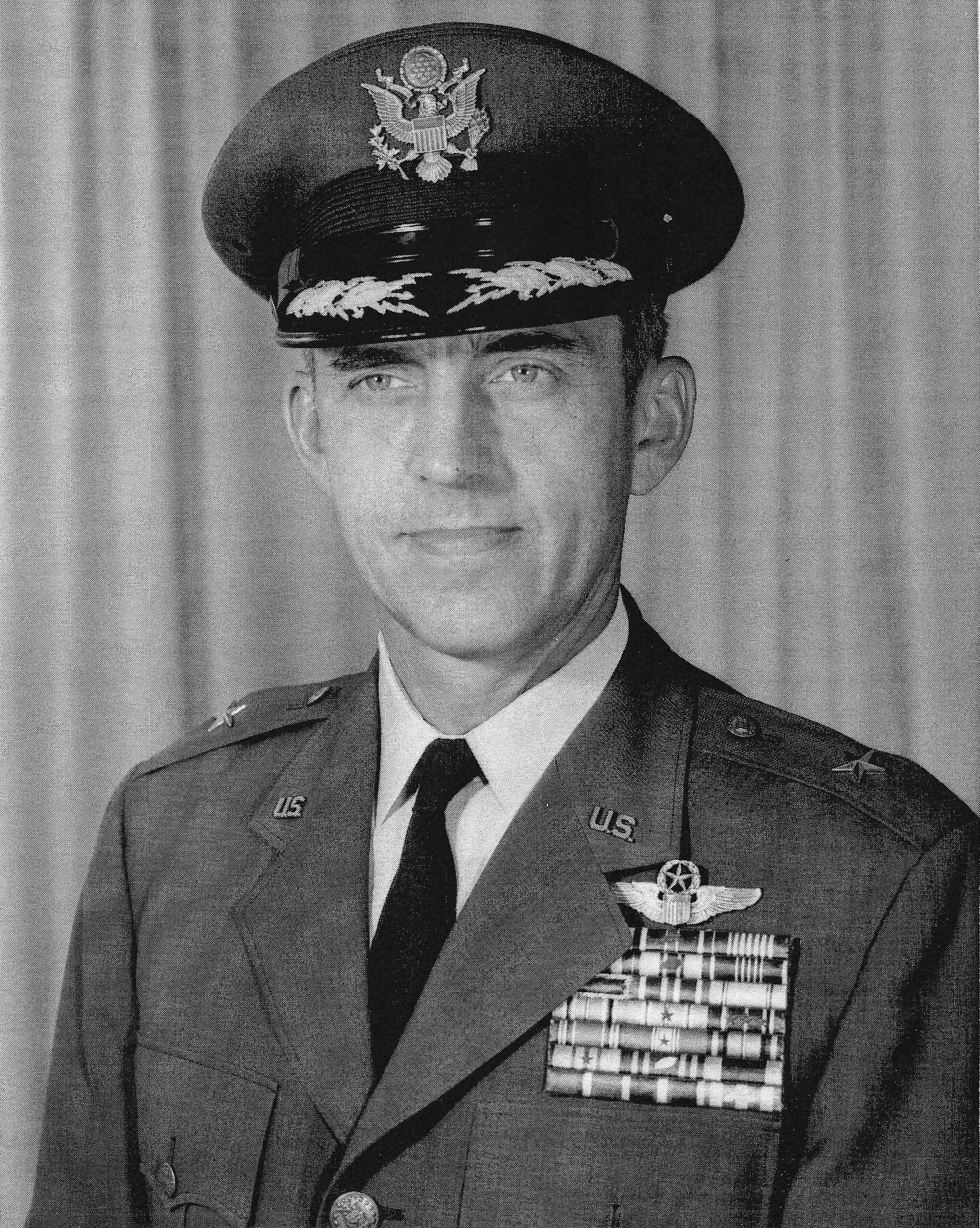
- Wild photographed in October 1967 as a Brigadier General
- Born: April 15, 1918; Elmwood, Wisconsin
- Died: February 18, 2013 (aged 94); Riverside, California
- Military career
- Allegiance: United States of America
- Branch: United States Air Force
- Rank: Brigadier general

Hugh Eldon Wild (April 15, 1918 – February 18, 2013) was a brigadier general in the United States Air Force.

== Biography ==
Wild was born in Elmwood, Wisconsin, in 1918. He studied at the University of Iowa and George Washington University.

== Career ==
Wild joined the United States Army Air Corps in 1940. He served in World War II, participating in campaigns including the Philippines Campaign (1944–45). Following the war he was assigned to the Strategic Air Command. During the Vietnam War he was in command of the 834th Air Division. Following his service in that war he was given command of the 322d Air Division and the 435th Military Airlift Support Wing. He retired on 1 February 1970.

Awards he received include the Legion of Merit with oak leaf cluster, the Distinguished Flying Cross with oak leaf cluster, the Air Medal with three oak leaf clusters, and the Army Commendation Medal.
