= Frank DiPaolo =

American politician (1906–2013)

Frank DiPaolo (December 24, 1906 – February 14, 2013) was an American politician and mentor to Patrick J. Kennedy. He was given the title of being Kennedy's campaign treasurer in 1988 and worked as a doorkeeper of the Rhode Island House of Representatives from the 1970s until he officially retired in 2010. DiPaolo entered politics under New York governor, Al Smith in 1928 as his driver and helped in his presidential campaign against Herbert Hoover. DiPaolo later helped in Patrick Kennedy's 1994 congressional campaign.
