= Maya Jackson Randall =

- Born: 1979
- Died: February 26, 2013 (aged 33); Atlanta, Georgia
- Cause of death: Leukemia
- Education: Howard University
- Occupation: Journalist
- Employer: The Wall Street Journal

Maya Jackson Randall (1979 – February 26, 2013) was an American news reporter for The Wall Street Journal (WSJ). She had also written or edited for Money Magazine, McGraw-Hill and Dow Jones Newswires. Jackson Randall died of leukemia at the age of 33.

== Career ==
Jackson Randall was the daughter of Harold Jackson, who had been the director of the Southern Regional Press Institute at Savannah State University. She attended Lakeside High School in DeKalb County, Georgia, and she graduated from Howard University in 2000. While in a graduate program at the University of Maryland, she interned at WSJ. Jackson wrote for Money Magazine in New York after graduate school. She then moved to McGraw-Hill in Washington, D.C., as an associate editor. She worked for Dow Jones Newswires before returning to WSJ as a consumer-finance reporter.

Much of Jackson Randall's work involved coverage of the United States financial crisis. After she wrote several pieces on the Troubled Asset Relief Program, the US Treasury was made to reveal how the program's funds were being spent. Near the end of 2011, she also reported on Barack Obama's attempts to make recess appointments, a subject that ended up before the U.S. Supreme Court.

== Illness and death ==
Jackson Randall was diagnosed with leukemia in 2009. She underwent treatment and went into remission, but she experienced a relapse in 2012. Jackson Randall continued to work and write during her initial illness and her relapse. She died on February 26, 2013, in Atlanta, Georgia, where she had been receiving medical care. She was survived by her husband Jeremy and by her son Jeremiah, who was born in 2007.
