= Kimberly Walker (soldier) =

American soldier (died 2013)

Kimberly Walker (November 9, 1984 – February 14, 2013) was an American in the US Army with the rank of corporal who served in the Iraq war.

Walker was strangled to death by her boyfriend, Sergeant Montrell Lamar Anderson Mayo, on February 14, 2013, in a hotel room in Colorado Springs. Mayo was convicted of first-degree murder by a military jury and sentenced to life without parole, demotion to private and dishonorable discharge.
