= Theresia van der Pant =

Dutch sculptor

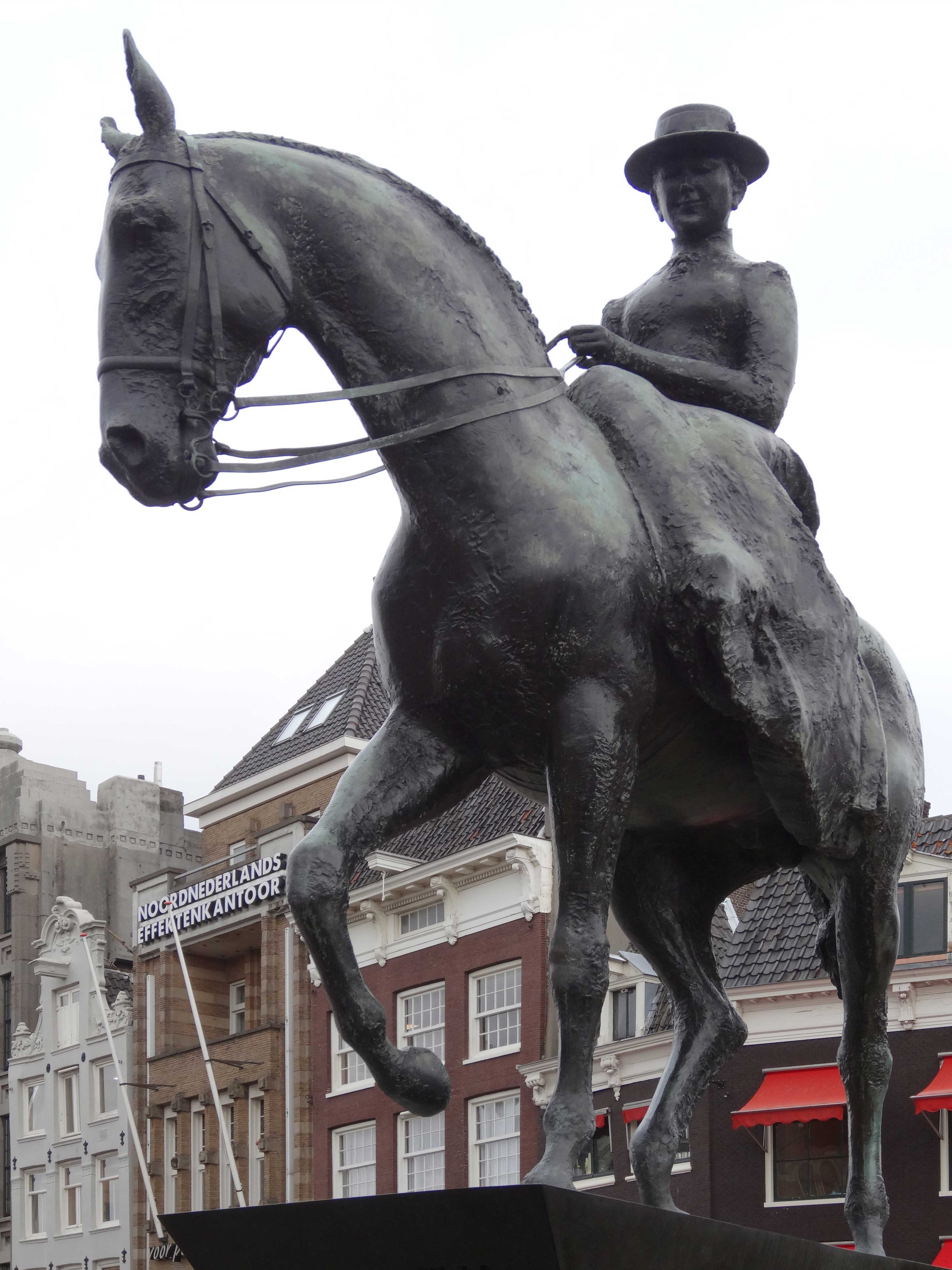
Theresia van der Pant's Equestrian statue of Queen Wilhelmina in Amsterdam.

Theresia Reiniera van der Pant (27 November 1924, Schiedam – 4 February 2013, Amsterdam) was a Dutch sculptor. Examples of her work include the Equestrian statue of Queen Wilhelmina, which stands on Rokin street in Amsterdam.
