= Ronald Edwards (cricketer) =

South African cricketer (1917–2013)

Personal information
- Born: 1 April 1917; Pretoria, South Africa
- Died: 26 February 2013 (aged 95); Magaliesburg, South Africa
- Source: ESPNcricinfo, 10 June 2016

Ronald Edwards (1 April 1917 – 26 February 2013) was a South African cricketer. He played twelve first-class matches for Northerns between 1939 and 1952.
