= György Kézdy =

Hungarian actor

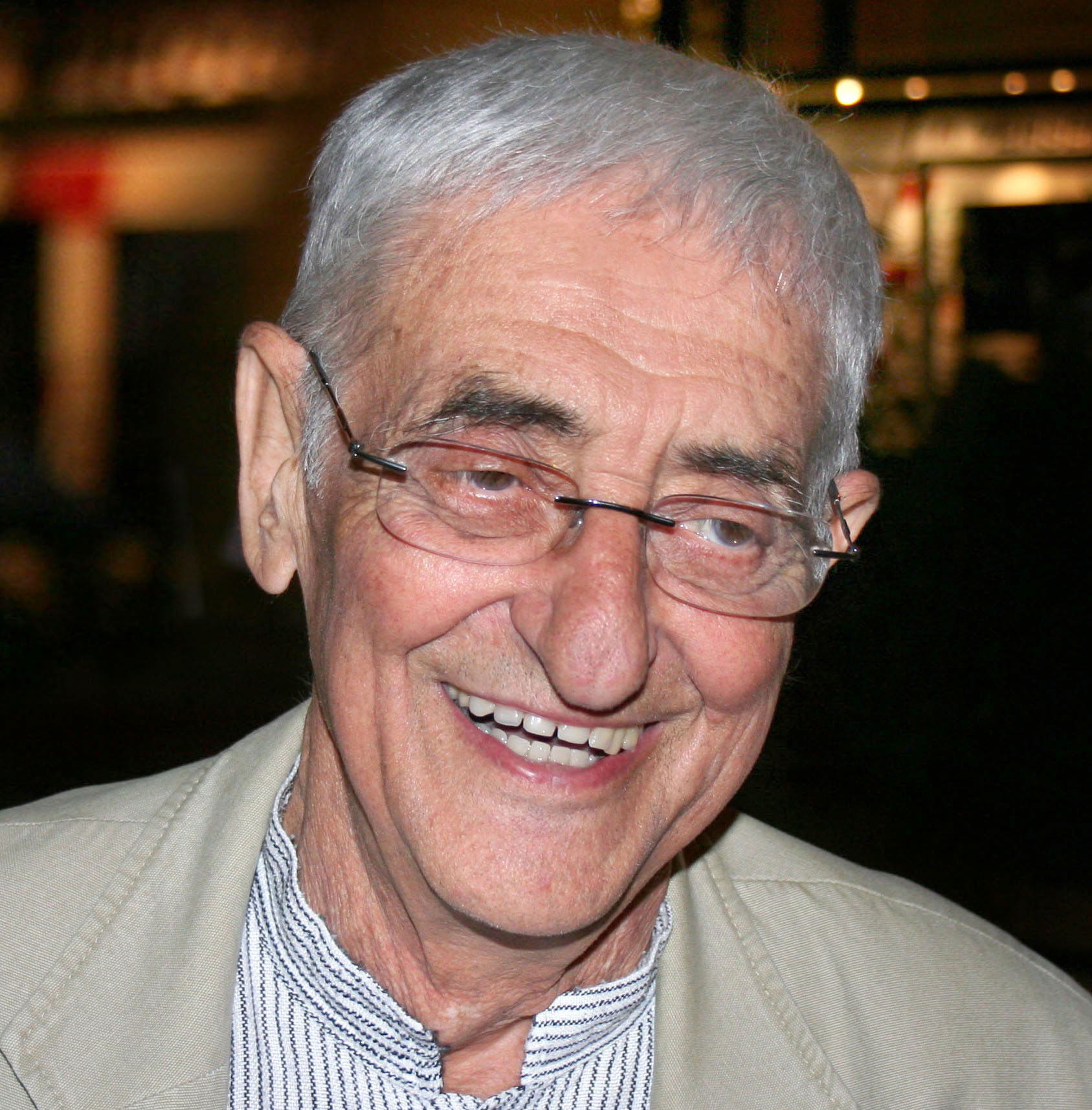
- Born: 14 February 1936; Budapest, Hungary
- Died: 8 February 2013 (aged 76); Budapest, Hungary
- Occupation: Actor
- Years active: 1962–2010

György Kézdy (Krausz; 14 February 1936 – 8 February 2013) was a Hungarian actor, most notable for his role in the Hungarian television show Szomszédok (Neighbors). He killed himself in 2013.
