= Deng Wei (photographer) =

Chinese portrait photographer

Deng Wei Hon FRPS
- 邓伟
- Born: April 13, 1959; Beijing, China
- Died: February 3, 2013 (aged 53); Beijing, China
- Resting place: Babaoshan Revolutionary Cemetery, Beijing; 39°54′28″N 116°14′09″E
- Education: Fu Jen Catholic University

Deng Wei Hon FRPS (April 13, 1959 – February 3, 2013) was a Chinese portrait photographer who was a professor at Tsinghua University, China. He was known for his photographic projects such as the Chinese Cultural Celebrity Portrait project, and the World Celebrities project.

== Early life ==
Deng Wei was born into an intellectual family. His grandfather, Deng Xuecen (1877-1949), was a famous traditional Chinese doctor. His father, Deng Yuwen (1917-1989), graduated from Fu Jen Catholic University in Beijing (now located on Taiwan), and was an educator and cultural scholar. During Deng Wei’s youth, he studied painting under the tutelage of Li Keran, a painter and professor at the China Central Academy of Fine Arts. Deng Wei also studied aesthetic theory under the tutelage of Zhu Guangqian, aesthetician and professor of Peking University. From 1978 to 1982, he studied at the Department of Photography in Beijing Film Academy. In 1982, he graduated with excellent grades and started to teach at the Beijing Film Academy.

== Career ==
- From 1978 to 1986, Deng Wei finished his first celebrity portrait album entitled "Portrait Collections of Chinese Cultural Celebrity". The collection was published by the Joint Publishing Co. in Hong Kong, which was hailed as "a Cultural Project for China". It filled the gap in Chinese celebrity portrait photography, and made pioneering contributions for the establishment and development of celebrity portraits in China.
- From 1982 to 1990, Deng Wei lectured at the Beijing Film Academy, where he taught the courses "Photographic Composition" and "Portrait Photography". During this period he also published "Sculpting in an Instant: The Method of Photographic Sculpting".
- In 1984, he shot the film Sacrificed Youth (Qingchun Ji), which won several prestigious awards including the Hong Kong International Film Festival Chinese-language films Awards, 1985; The France Dorset International Film Festival Special Jury Award 1986 and The 6th Hong Kong Film Awards, 1987.
- From 1990 to 2000, Deng Wei continued shooting portraits of global celebrities on five continents. He depicted hundreds of portraits in a unique perspective for outstanding politicians, cultural figures, artists and scientists. He also wrote extensively, with his contributions praised as "Outstanding contributions in photographic history".
- In 2004, he held a photographic exhibition titled "Portraits of Peace" in the United Nations Headquarters. The exhibition was aimed to promote peace, harmonious coexistence and collaborative development for all mankind.
- Since 2008, Deng Wei has been a professor at the Academy of Arts & Design, Tsinghua University. Beijing, China.

== Solo exhibitions ==
- 2001. World Celebrities Through Deng Wei's Camera[6], National Art Museum of China
- 2001. Deng Wei: A Look at the World, International Exhibition Center, Beijing, China
- 2002.Deng Wei: Photography Art Exhibition, Li Keran's exhibition ancient house, Xu Zhou, China
- 2003.Deng Wei: Photography Art Exhibition, He Xiangning Art Museum, Shenzhen, China
- 2004. Portraits of Peace, UN Headquarters, New York
- 2005. Portraits of Peace: Impressions of World Peacemakers and Visionaries, Atlanta.
- 2006, Wind from China, The Royal Photographic Society in England
- 2007, Deng Wei Photography Exhibition “In Pursuit of Sunlight”, National Art Museum of China
- 2008, Sun on the Aegean Sea, Capital Museum in China
- 2009, Bijinger, Capital Museum in China
- 2010, Chinese, 2010 Shanghai Expo in China
- Photography works are collected worldwide by a number of organizations such as The National Gallery, museums and libraries.

== Books ==
- A Photographic Record of Eminent Cultural Figures of China, Joint Publishing Co. (HK), 1986, INSB 962·04·0504·8
- The Method of Photographic Sculpting, The Chinese Institute of Photography, 1986
- Sculpting in an Instant, Zhejiang Photographic Press, 1991, 1992, 1998, INSB: 7-80536-120-7/J·60
- Deng Wei's Diary, Jiang Xi Fine Arts Publishing House, 1999, ISBN 7-80580-611-X/J·573
- A Photographic Record of Eminent World Figures, Jiang Xi Fine Arts Publishing House, 2000, ISBN 7-80580-610-1/J·572
- Deng Wei: A Look at the World, Zhejiang Photographic Press, 2001, ISBN 7-80536-859-7
- Top-Notch Photographic Works By 6DengWei, Chongqing Publishing House, 2003, ISBN 9787536661684
- Selection of Photographic Works By DengWei, Chongqing Publishing House, 2003, ISBN 978-7-5366-6167-7. J·1001
- Eight years Vol.1, China Travel & Tourism Press, 2004, INSB 7-5032-2271-9/J·75
- Eight years Vol.2, China Travel & Tourism Press, 2004, INSB 7-5032-2272-7/J·76
- Eight years Vol.3, China Travel & Tourism Press, 2004, INSB 7-5032-2273-5/J·77
- Deng Wei and Fifty Faces, China Intercontinental Press, 2004, ISBN 7-5085-0650-2
- Wind from China, The Royal Photographic Society, 2006
- Collected Literary Works by Deng Wei, China Photographic Publishing House, 2007, ISBN 978-7-80236-092-1
- Album of Works Donated by Deng Wei To The National Art Museum of China, People’s Education Press, 2007, ISBN 978-7-107-20375-6
- The Story of Learning Chinese Painting, Shandong Pictorial Publishing House, ISBN 9787807135937
- Greece Through the eyes of Prof. Deng Wei, China Federation of Literary and Art Circles Publishing House, 2008, ISBN 978-7-5059-5975-0
- In Pursuit of Sunlight, Tianjin Yang Liu Qing Fine Arts Press, 2009, ISBN 9787807383611
- Beijinger, Beijing Publishing House (Group), 2009, ISBN 978-7-200-07950-0/K.802
- Chinese, China Intercontinental Press, 2010, ISBN 978-7-5085-2002-5

== Main awards ==
- Film Sacrificed Youth (Qingchun ji) 1984, The Hong Kong International Film Festival Chinese-language films Awards, 1985. The France Dorset International Film Festival Special Jury Award 1986. The 6th Hong Kong Film Awards, 1987.
- The Golden Medal of The 6th China Photography Arts, 2004
- 2010, Award for outstanding graduates of the 60th anniversary of the Beijing Film Academy, 2006
- Honorary Fellowship (Hon.FRPS) of The Royal Photographic Society, 2007
- The Greece Wisdom Award, 2009
- PPA International Award for Outstanding Contribution, 2010
- Outstanding Graduates Award of The 60th anniversary of Beijing Film Academy.
- Honorary Doctoral Degree of University of Athens, 2011
