= Qian Haiyan =

Haiyan QIAN, 钱海燕

Director, Division for Public Administration & Development Management (DPADM), Department of Economic and Social Affairs (UNDESA), United Nations
- In office 1 February 2009 – 18 February 2013

Personal details
- Born: September 14, 1955 Beijing, China
- Died: February 18, 2013 (aged 57) Washington, D.C., United States
- Occupation: United Nations Civil Servant

Haiyan Qian (钱海燕) (September 14, 1955 – February 18, 2013) was the Director of the Division for Public Administration & Development Management (DPADM), United Nations Department of Economic and Social Affairs (UNDESA).

== Life ==
She received her Bachelor of Arts in Beijing, China and her Master in Public Administration from the Kennedy School of Government, Harvard University.

For the last 33 years, Haiyan has dedicated her career to global public policy, governance and public administration. Since joining the United Nations Department of Economic and Social Affairs (UNDESA), formerly the Department of Development Support & Management Services (DDSMS), Ms. Qian has served in various capacities. From 1994 to 1997, she served as a Senior Economic Affairs Officer in the then Public Finance and Private Sector Branch of the Division for Governance, Public Administration and Finance. In this capacity, she carried out analytical work on economic restructuring and peace time redeployment of military resources. From 1998 to 2002, she served as the Chief of Technical Cooperation Cluster, Chief of Information and Networking Unit, and Chief Manager of the United Nations Public Administration Network (UNPAN) in the then Division for Public Economics and Public Administration (DPEPA). She was instrumental in the development of UNPAN which started out as a United Nations Development Account Project. In 2003 and 2004, she served as the Chief of the Public Administration Networking Unit and Chief Manager of UNPAN, Division for Public Administration & Development Management (DPADM), United Nations Department of Economic and Social Affairs (UNDESA). From 2005 to 2009, Ms. Qian served as Chief of the e-Government Branch (formerly known as Knowledge Management Branch), until she was appointed Director of DPADM.

Prior to that, she worked for other United Nations agencies, such as the Centre for Science and Technology for Development, before it merged with UN DDSMS, and the UNEP Centre on Environmentally Sound Technology in Japan. Before joining the United Nations, Ms. Qian worked for the Chinese Government in the area of science and technology for development and served in the Chinese Permanent Mission to the United Nations based in New York twice, covering the United Nations Second Committee on Social and Economic Affairs.

UN Perspective: Governments Today - Interview with Ms. Haiyan Qian - FutureGov

Speaker at World Economic Forum; and the Sixth Ministerial eGovernment Conference, entitled "Borderless eGovernment Services for Europeans", on 17–18 November 2011, City of Poznań.
