= Claude Covassi =

Swiss criminal and spy (1970–2013)

Claude Covassi (1970 – 8 February 2013) was a Swiss criminal and spy.

== Biography ==
Born in Geneva, Covassi studied philosophy in Paris, where he became close friends with Paolo Fogagnolo, a former member of the Italian Red Brigades. In the 1990s, Covassi settled on Ibiza. He was twice convicted of fraud and made a living smuggling drugs to Ibiza to supply the local party scene.

In 2003, the police of Geneva recruited Covassi as an informant because of his knowledge about European cocaine smuggling networks. They soon passed him on to the Swiss internal intelligence service, DAP, who paid Covassi to infiltrate the Centre Islamique de Genève, an Islamic religious center in Geneva, in order to determine whether the center was a haven for Islamic fundamentalists. The operation was almost aborted because Covassi was again arrested for credit card fraud, but the DAP bailed him out. In the event, Covassi reported no actionable intelligence from the center, but converted to Islam during his stay.

In 2005, the Swiss intelligence services directed Covassi to attempt infiltrating terrorist groups in Syria, but he had no success. Disappointed with his handlers, in 2006 he made his intelligence work public in a newspaper interview in which he alleged that the intelligence services illegally directed him to compromise the center's controversial leader Hani Ramadan. Soon later, he was assaulted in public and immigrated to Cairo. The resulting media attention led to an investigation by a Swiss parliamentary committee, which eventually dismissed most of Covassi's allegations as not credible and found that Covassi's actions on behalf of the intelligence services had not been illegal.

In 2009, Covassi was convicted for illegal trafficking of anabolic steroids. In November 2012, having returned to Geneva, he was again in the news in Switzerland because of anti-semitic statements he had made on the Internet. On 8 February 2013, he was found dead, apparently as a result of a drug overdose according to initial police reports.
