= International Technological University =

Private university in San Jose, California

- Motto: Global Development Through Silicon Valley Education
- Type: Unaccredited private university
- Established: 1994
- President: Yau Gene Chan
- Administrative staff: 167
- Location: Santa Clara, California, United States; 37.388767°N 121.930889°W
- Campus: Urban campus
- Nickname: ITU
- Website: www.itu.edu

International Technological University (ITU) is an unaccredited private university in Santa Clara, California, United States. It was founded in 1994 by Professor Shu-Park Chan, previously a professor and interim dean of the School of Engineering at Santa Clara University. The university was accredited by the WASC Senior College and University Commission until June 2025.

== History ==
International Technological University (ITU) was founded in 1994 by Professor Shu-Park Chan, previously a professor and interim dean of the School of Engineering at Santa Clara University. Chan retired early from Santa Clara in 1992 to found ITU two years later. In 2011, upon Shu-Park Chan’s retirement, the Board of Trustees elected his son Yau-Gene Chan, previously Executive Vice-President, to the ITU presidency. Following the WASC special investigation into Third Party Comments in February 2015, the Board of Trustees removed Chan and appointed Dr. Gregory O'Brien as the new President of ITU. In October 2019, the Board of Trustees reinstalled the previously removed Chan to be the president and Chan immediately furloughed all staff citing financial difficulties.

ITU moved to its current campus in Downtown San Jose in April 2011, from its original location in Sunnyvale. In 2014, it was announced that ITU would move to a new 76,568 square foot facility on 2711 North First Street, San Jose. ITU completed the move to its current campus on March 25, 2015.

== Accreditation ==
ITU was accredited by ACICS from July 1, 2001 to December 31, 2004, according to the US Department of Education Database of Accredited Postsecondary Institutions and Programs. ITU was institutionally accredited by the WASC Senior College and University Commission (WSCUC) as of February 22, 2013. On October 17, 2019, WSCUC placed ITU on "Show Cause" status due to lack of compliance with the five issues of leadership structure, staff intimidation, insufficient staff and faculty as a result of the furlough of all staffers, non-viable financial sustainability, and the questionable independence of the trustees. On June 17, 2022, WSCUC withdrew the accreditation of the school, however, the school has filed for an appeal. ITU remained accredited until a decision to the appeal was made. WSCUC officially withdrew ITU's accreditation effectively on June 27, 2025.

The university's MBA program in business analytics is accredited by the Accreditation Council for Business Schools and Programs (ACBSP). It has been ACBSP-accredited since 2017.

== Academics ==
ITU offers several master's degree programs, three doctoral programs, four certificate programs, in six academic departments:

=== North San Jose Campus ===
In 2014, it was announced that ITU would move from its Downtown San Jose location to a new facility, on 2711 North First Street. The new facility is approximately three times the size of ITU's previous location. The campus has a 300-seat lecture hall, gym, yoga studio, research labs, as well as additional classrooms and faculty offices.

=== Laboratories ===
The university operates laboratories in the following areas: IoT/Embedded Systems, Artificial Intelligence/Robotics, Green Energy, and Bioelectronics staffed by faculty and graduate students of the Department of Electrical Engineering (EE). The SAP Laboratory operated by the Department of Business Administration, serves as an SAP training center for the region. ITU is a member of the SAP University Alliance Program. The University also operates a joint laboratory with Peking University’s School of Software and Microelectronics through its Artificial Intelligence/Robotics Laboratory.

== Enrollment practices ==
The Chronicle of Higher Education reported that after its near-bankruptcy in 2006, ITU began to promise international students the opportunity to work full-time jobs immediately upon arrival. It became popular in online Indian student forums as a good place to extend a student visa or get a job. In March 2011, enrollment increased to 1500 students, 94% of which were Indian. ITU has been criticized for attracting unknowing international students when its accreditation and credit transfer policy are questionable. The Chronicle noted that ITU's provost at that time, Gerald A. Cory, was paid $445,832 in 2009, an unusually high salary.

On January 8, 2021, ITU entered into a settlement agreement with the United States to pay $1,170,000 under the qui tam provisions of the False Claims Act, in order to settle allegations related to student visa fraud.
