= 2013 in literature =

This article contains information about the literary events and publications of 2013.

== Events ==
- 21 January – An annual Orwell Day is instituted.
- 26 January – Fleeing Islamist insurgents set fire to library buildings in Timbuktu containing manuscripts, mostly in Arabic, dating back to 1204.
- 7 March – World Book Day becomes a UNESCO-designated event marked in more than 100 countries.
- April – J. K. Rowling publishes a detective novel, The Cuckoo's Calling, under the pseudonym Robert Galbraith, with the U.K. publisher Sphere Books. The author's identity is revealed by the media in July.
- 23 April – World Book Night.
- 28 April – The Curious Incident of the Dog in the Night-Time, Simon Stephens' stage adaptation of a novel by Mark Haddon, wins a record seven awards at the 2013 Laurence Olivier Awards in London.
- 1 July – Publisher Penguin Random House is created by a merger.
- 3 September – The new Library of Birmingham, the largest public library in the U.K., is opened by Malala Yousafzai. Its public spaces are integrated with those of the Birmingham Repertory Theatre.
- October – Jo Nesbø reveals himself as Tom Johansen, author of three forthcoming novels.
- 28 November – Three unpublished works by J. D. Salinger (died 2010), including "The Ocean Full of Bowling Balls", are leaked onto the internet.

=== Anniversaries ===
- 11 February
  - 50th anniversary of the death of Sylvia Plath in 1963
  - 200th anniversary of the birth of Harriet Jacobs in 1813
- 28 January – 200th anniversary of the publication of Pride and Prejudice in 1813
- 5 May – 200th anniversary of the birth of Søren Kierkegaard in 1813
- 2 June – 100th anniversary of the birth of Barbara Pym
- 29 June – 400th anniversary of the burning of the Globe Theatre during a production of Shakespeare and Fletcher's Henry VIII in 1613
- 2 August – 25th anniversary of the death of US short story writer Raymond Carver
- 7 November – 100th anniversary of the birth of Albert Camus
- 22 November – 50th anniversary of the death of Aldous Huxley

== New books ==
=== Fiction ===
- Chimamanda Ngozi Adichie – Americanah
- José Eduardo Agualusa – A General Theory of Oblivion (Teoria Geral do Esquecimento)
- Jacob M. Appel – The Biology of Luck
- Ketan Bhagat – Complete/convenient
- Dan Brown – Inferno
- Adam Christopher – The Burning Dark
- J. M. Coetzee – The Childhood of Jesus
- Troy Denning – Crucible
- Doug Dorst – S.
- Richard Flanagan – The Narrow Road to the Deep North
- Aminatta Forna – The Hired Man
- Frederick Forsyth – The Kill List
- Neil Gaiman – The Ocean at the End of the Lane
- Elizabeth Graver – The End of the Point
- David G. Hartwell (ed.) – Year's best SF 18
- Neamat Imam – The Black Coat
- Reinhard Jirgl – Nichts von euch auf Erden
- Philip Kerr – A Man Without Breath
- Stephen King – Doctor Sleep
- Rachel Kushner – The Flamethrowers
- Paul Kwiatkowski – And Every Day Was Overcast
- Pierre Lemaitre – Au revoir là-haut (The Great Swindle)
- Eimear McBride – A Girl Is a Half-formed Thing
- Alex Miller – Coal Creek
- Haruki Murakami (村上 春樹) – Colorless Tsukuru Tazaki and His Years of Pilgrimage (色彩を持たない多崎つくると、彼の巡礼の年, Tsukuru to, kare no junrei no toshi)
- Adam Nevill – House of Small Shadows
- Nnedi Okorafor – Kabu-Kabu: Stories
- Chuck Palahniuk – Doomed
- Rick Riordan – The House of Hades
- Veronica Roth – Allegiant
- J. K. Rowling (as Robert Galbraith) – The Cuckoo's Calling
- Ahmed Saadawi – Frankenstein in Baghdad (فرانكشتاين في بغداد)
- M. G. Sanchez – The Escape Artist: a Gibraltarian novel
- John Scalzi – The Human Division
- Sjón – Moonstone – The Boy Who Never Was (Mánasteinn – drengurinn sem aldrei var til)
- Robert Stone – Death of the Black-Haired Girl
- Donna Tartt – The Goldfinch
- Zlatko Topčić – Dagmar
- Peter Watts – Beyond the Rift (collected stories)
- Tim Winton – Eyrie

=== Children's and young people ===
- David Almond – Mouse Bird Snake Wolf
- John Barrowman and Carole Barrowman – "Bone Quill"
- Anthony Horowitz – Russian Roulette
- Patricia MacLachlan – Cat Talk
- Rainbow Rowell – Fangirl
- Maggie Stiefvater – The Dream Thieves (second book in The Raven Cycle)

=== Drama ===
- Annie Baker – The Flick
- Elfriede Jelinek – Die Schutzbefohlenen
- Lucy Kirkwood – Chimerica
- Stefano Massini – The Lehman Trilogy
- Edward Petherbridge and Kathryn Hunter – My Perfect Mind

=== Non-fiction ===
- Saroo Brierley – A Long Way Home
- Olavo de Carvalho – O Mínimo Que Você Precisa Saber para Não Ser um Idiota
- Kate Christensen – Blue Plate Special: An Autobiography of My Appetites
- Pat Conroy – The Death of Santini: The Story of a Father and His Son
- Jared Diamond – The World Until Yesterday
- Craig Dworkin – No Medium
- Peter Freeman – The Wallpapered Manse
- Malcolm Gladwell – David and Goliath
- Ben Goldacre – Bad Pharma
- Temple Grandin – The Autistic Brain
- Gary Greenberg – The Book of Woe
- Wil Haygood – The Butler: A Witness to History
- Michael Kimmel – Angry White Men
- Mark Levin – The Liberty Amendments
- Peter H. Maguire – Thai Stick
- Diane Muldrow – Everything I Need To Know I Learned From A Little Golden Book
- Dimitra Papagianni and Michael A. Morse – The Neanderthals Rediscovered
- Thomas Piketty – Capital in the Twenty-First Century (Le Capital au XXIe siècle)
- Lisa Randall – Higgs Discovery
- Sheryl Sandberg – Lean In
- Nina Stibbe – Love, Nina: Despatches from Family Life
- Jeff VanderMeer – The Illustrated Guide to Creating Imaginative Fiction

== Deaths ==
- 2 January
  - Alexei Rudeanu, Romanian writer (born 1939)
  - Teresa Torańska, Polish journalist and writer (born 1944)
- 7 January – Maruša Krese, Slovene poet, writer and journalist (born 1947)
- 10 January – Evan S. Connell, American novelist, poet and short story writer (born 1924)
- 11 January – Robert Kee, English writer, journalist and broadcaster (born 1919)
- 18 January – Jacques Sadoul, French novelist, book editor and non-fiction writer (born 1934)
- 20 January
  - Yemi Ajibade, Nigerian playwright and actor (born 1929)
  - Dolores Prida, Cuban-American journalist and playwright (born 1943)
  - Toyo Shibata (柴田トヨ), Japanese poet (born 1911)
- 24 January – Richard G. Stern, American novelist and educator (born 1928)
- 2 February – Sirajul Haq Memon, Pakistani author, journalist and scholar in Sindhi (born 1933)
- 3 February – Robert Anthony Welch, Irish author and academic (born 1947)
- 4 February – Margaret Frazer (Gail Lynn Brown), American historical novelist (born 1946)
- 5 February – Leda Mileva, Bulgarian writer, translator, and diplomat (born 1920)
- 7 February
  - Niki Marangou, Cypriot writer and painter (born 1948)
  - Jonathan Rendall, English author (born 1964)
- 8 February – Alan Sharp, Scottish-American screenwriter and author (born 1934)
- 10 February – W. Watts Biggers, American novelist (born 1927)
- 12 February – Barnaby Conrad, American author (born 1922)
- 13 February – Oswald LeWinter, Austrian-born American writer (born 1931)
- 14 February
  - Glenn Boyer, American author (born 1924)
  - Mary Brave Bird, American Lakota writer and activist (born 1954)
  - Friedrich Neznansky, Russian writer (born 1932)
- 17 February
  - William Bridges, American author and business consultant (born 1933)
  - Manoranjan Das, Indian playwright (born 1923)
  - Debbie Ford, American motivational author (born 1955)
- 23 February
  - Maurice Rosy, Belgian comics writer (born 1927)
  - Sylvia Smith, English writer (born 1945)
- 24 February – Mahmoud Salem, Egyptian author (born 1931)
- 26 February
  - Jan Howard Finder, American science fiction writer (born 1939)
  - Stéphane Hessel, German-born French author and diplomat (born 1917)
- 27 February
  - Molly Lefebure, English writer (born 1919)
  - Imants Ziedonis, Latvian poet (born 1933)
- 10 March – Robert Chrisman, American poet, scholar, and critic, co-founder of The Black Scholar (born 1937)
- 1 April – Kildare Dobbs, Canadian author (born 1923)
- 11 April – Adam Galos, Polish historian (born 1924)
- 13 April – Nick Pollotta, American science fiction author (born 1954)
- 20 April
  - Jocasta Innes, China-born English non-fiction writer (born 1934)
  - E. L. Konigsburg, American children's novelist and illustrator (born 1930)
- 22 April – Clément Marchand, Canadian poet and journalist (born 1912)
- 1 May – Gregory Rogers, Australian children's author and illustrator (born 1957)
- 12 May – Per Maurseth, Norwegian historian (born 1932)
- 23 May – William Demby, American author (born 1922)
- 26 May – Jack Vance, American mystery, fantasy, and science fiction writer (born 1916)
- 6 June – Tom Sharpe, English comic novelist (born 1928)
- 9 June – Iain Banks, Scottish novelist (born 1954)
- 15 June – Peride Celal, Turkish author (born 1915)
- 23 June – Richard Matheson, American author and screenwriter (born 1926)
- 12 July – Elaine Morgan, Welsh writer on anthropology (born 1920)
- 2 September – Frederik Pohl, American science fiction writer (born 1919)
- 18 September – Marcel Reich-Ranicki, Polish-born German literary critic (born 1920)
- 19 September – Edilberto K. Tiempo, Filipino novelist and literary critic (born 1913)
- 21 September – Kofi Awoonor, Ghanaian poet (shot dead, born 1935)
- 23 September
  - Christopher Koch, Australian novelist (born 1932)
  - Álvaro Mutis, Colombian poet, novelist and essayist (born 1923)
  - Luciano Vincenzoni, Italian screenwriter (born 1926)
- 1 October – Tom Clancy, American thriller writer (born 1947)
- 25 November – Joel Lane, English author, poet, and critic (born 1963)
- 11 December – Barbara Branden, Canadian-American author (born 1929)

== Awards ==
- Akutagawa Prize (Early): Kaori Fujino for Tsume to Me (爪と目) "Nails and Eyes"
- Caine Prize for African Writing: Tope Folarin, "Miracle"
- Camões Prize: Mia Couto
- Danuta Gleed Literary Award: (announced 11 June 2013)
- David Cohen Prize: Hilary Mantel
- Dayne Ogilvie Prize: Main award, C. E. Gatchalian; honours of distinction, Anand Mahadevan, Barry Webster
- Dylan Thomas Prize: Battleborn by Claire Vaye Watkins
- European Book Prize: Eduardo Mendoza, An Englishman in Madrid, and Arnaud Leparmentier, The French, gravediggers of the euro
- Friedenspreis des Deutschen Buchhandels: Svetlana Alexievich
- German Book Prize: Terézia Mora, Das Ungeheuer
- Goldsmiths Prize: A Girl Is a Half-formed Thing by Eimear McBride
- Gordon Burn Prize: Pig Iron by Ben Myers
- Governor General's Award for English-language fiction: The Luminaries by Eleanor Catton
- Governor General's Award for French-language fiction: Quand les guêpes se taisent by Stéphanie Pelletier
- Grand Prix du roman de l'Académie française: Plonger by Christophe Ono-dit-Biot
- Hugo Award for Best Novel: John Scalzi for Redshirts
- International Dublin Literary Award: City of Bohane by Kevin Barry
- International Prize for Arabic Fiction: The Bamboo Stalk by Saud Alsanousi
- Lambda Literary Awards: Multiple categories; see 2013 Lambda Literary Awards
- Man Booker Prize: The Luminaries by Eleanor Catton
- Miles Franklin Award: Questions of Travel by Michelle de Kretser
- National Biography Award (5 August): The Two Frank Thrings by Peter Fitzpatrick
- National Book Award for Fiction: The Good Lord Bird by James McBride
- National Book Critics Circle Award: to Americanah by Chimamanda Ngozi Adichie
- Nobel Prize in Literature: Alice Munro
- PEN/Faulkner Award for Fiction: Everything Begins and Ends at the Kentucky Club by Benjamin Alire Sáenz
- Premio Planeta de Novela: El cielo ha vuelto by Clara Sánchez
- Premio Strega: Resistere non serve a niente by Walter Siti
- Pritzker Military Library Literature Award: to Tim O'Brien
- Prix Goncourt: Au revoir là-haut by Pierre Lemaitre
- Pulitzer Prize for Fiction: The Orphan Master's Son by Adam Johnson
- Pulitzer Prize for Poetry: Stag's Leap by Sharon Olds
- Russian Booker Prize: Возвращение в Панджруд (Return to Panjrud) by Andrei Volos
- SAARC Literary Award: Suman Pokhrel, Abhay K, Daya Dissanayake, Farheen Chaudhary, Abdul Khaliq Rashid
- Samuel Johnson Prize: (announced November 2013) The Pike by Lucy Hughes-Hallett
- Scotiabank Giller Prize: Lynn Coady, Hellgoing
- Whiting Awards: Fiction: Hannah Dela Cruz Abrams (fiction/nonfiction), Amanda Coplin, Jennifer duBois, C.E. Morgan, Stephanie Powell Watts; Nonfiction: Morgan Meis, Clifford Thompson; Plays: Virginia Grise; Poetry: Ishion Hutchinson, Rowan Ricardo Phillips
- Women's Prize for Fiction: May We Be Forgiven by A.M. Homes
- Zbigniew Herbert International Literary Award: W.S. Merwin
