= Overcast (disambiguation) =

Overcast is the state of the sky when it is covered by clouds; a type of weather.

Overcast may also refer to:

- Overcast (app), a podcast listening app by Marco Arment
- Overcast (band), an American metalcore band
- Overcast! (album), Atmosphere's first studio album
- Overcast! (EP), an "extended play" album by Atmosphere released prior to Overcast!
- The Overcast, a monthly arts and culture newspaper in St. John's, Newfoundland and Labrador
- Overcast, an episode of the Japanese anime Death Note

== See also ==
- Overcast stitch, a type of sewing stitch
- Central dense overcast, large central area of thunderstorms surrounding a cyclone's circulation center (eye)
- Operation Overcast, original name of Operation Paperclip, an Office of Strategic Services program to recruit German scientists after World War II
- Aluminum Overcast, a specific Boeing B-17 Flying Fortress bomber
  - Aluminum overcast, the type of bomber generically referred to as an "aluminum overcast" but more commonly known as Convair B-36
- And Every Day Was Overcast, a 2013 photo-illustrated novel by American author Paul Kwiatkowski
- Matthew Overcast, American politician
- Morning, An Overcast Day, Rouen, a late 19th century painting by Danish-French artist Camille Pissarro
- Overcast Off, a three piece indie rock band based out of Tucson, Arizona
- Overcast Media, a digital media technology company based in Seattle, Washington
- Overcasting, the process of broadcasting content that is meant to be played over and in sync with another piece of content
