= Rudeanu =

Rudeanu is a Romanian surname. Notable people with the surname include:

- Alexei Rudeanu (1939–2013), Romanian author
- Ion Rudeanu, Romanian fencer
