= Camille (Lemaitre novel) =

2012 novel by Pierre Lemaitre

- First edition (French)
- Author: Pierre Lemaitre
- Original title: Sacrifices
- Translator: Frank Wynne
- Language: French
- Series: Verhœven series
- Genre: Crime fiction
- Publisher: Albin Michel
- Publication date: 2012
- Publication place: France
- Media type: Print (hardcover)
- Pages: 496
- Preceded by: Alex
- Followed by: Rosy

Camille (Camille Verhœven Trilogy #3) is a crime novel written by French novelist Pierre Lemaitre. The novel, though originally published in French in 2012, came to be translated to English by Frank Wynne in 2015. It won the CWA International Dagger award 2015 amidst much international acclaim. It is the 3rd novel in the Camille Verhœven series by publication order.

== Reception ==
- "LeMaitre is a beautiful writer."―Crime Pieces
- "[The] stunning final volume of Lemaitre's Commandant Camille Verhoeven trilogy . . . The author won the CWA International Dagger Award for 2013's Alex, the first book in the trilogy to be published in the U.S., and this gut-wrenching entry may well garner similar honors."―Publishers Weekly (Starred Review)
- "Verhoeven remains a laser-focused detective who is relentless in doing whatever it takes to impose just a sliver of justice in a consistently unjust world. A bittersweet conclusion to this ferociously intense series."

―Booklist

== Awards ==
CWA International Dagger award 2013
