= Alex (Lemaitre novel) =

2013 novel by Pierre Lemaitre

- Cover of Alex
- Author: Pierre Lemaitre
- Original title: Alex
- Translator: Frank Wayne
- Language: English
- Series: Verhœven series
- Genre: Crime fiction
- Publisher: MacLehose Press
- Publication date: 1 August 2013
- Publication place: France
- Media type: Print (hardcover)
- Pages: 496
- ISBN: 978-1-782-06748-1
- OCLC: 1782060790
- Preceded by: Irene
- Followed by: Camille

Alex (Camille Verhœven Trilogy #2) is a crime novel written by French novelist Pierre Lemaitre. The novel was published in French in 2011 and was translated into English by Frank Wynne in 2013. Despite being Pierre Lemaitre's second novel in the Camille Verhœven series, it is the first novel to be translated into English.

It won the CWA International Dagger award 2013.

== Plot ==
Alex Prevost – kidnapped, savagely beaten, suspended from the ceiling of an abandoned warehouse in a wooden cage – is running out of time. Her abductor appears to want only to watch her die. Apart from a shaky eyewitness report, Police Commandant Camille Verhœven has nothing to go on: no suspects, no leads.

To find the young woman, the detective - a man with a tragic past and extraordinary abilities as an investigator - must first understand more about her.

== Summary ==
Part I

The plot is thrown open with the abduction of a 30 year old beautiful woman, Alex Prevost with an unreliable eyewitness who identifies 'a white van' as the abduction vehicle. Citing similarities to his wife's abduction and murder a couple of years ago, Police Commandant Camille Verhœven reluctantly accepts the case. The futile interrogation at the crime scene yields no leads and he sends an indecipherable sliver of nameplate (of the van) caught on a CCTV camera to the forensics' team.

The kidnapper places Alex, unclad, in a wooden cage and leaves it hanging off the ground in a defunct mill. He supplies her with dog food and water and abandons her, to return briefly, to click her snaps on his phone.

The van is traced to belong to 53 year old John-Pierre Trarieux. Upon recognizing the ambush set up by the police at his home, Trarieux makes a narrow escape and drives off to downtown Paris only to be cornered on a bridge. Trarieux jumps off the bridge to his death instead of surrendering. Verhœven finds Alex's pictures on his phone and another picture (in print) of Trariuex's son Pascal posing with another girl. They think of a possible link between Pascal's disappearance and Alex's kidnapping and interrogate the people with whom Trarieux had established communication prior to the abduction. This leads them to Sandrine - Alex's former roommate who identifies the girl with Pascal as Nathalie (a false name assumed by Alex) - and discover Pascal's body buried in her backyard under a water harvesting project which had been abruptly implemented by Nathalie before her untimely departure. Pascal's body had been scoured by sulphuric acid and Camille recollects two other deaths with a similar Modus operandi and postulates that Nathalie/Alex could have been a serial murderer.

Verhœven receives crucial information about Alex's location. Simultaneously, Alex smears her own blood onto the hemp rope holding her cage in place to lure rats to nibble upon the rope. The rope eventually snaps and the cage breaks apart as it falls on the floor. Alex escapes before the police get to the scene.

Part II

Verhœven convinced of Alex's involvement in the preceding two murders, interrogates the relatives of the victims - Stefen Maciak and Brenard Gattegno. Their respective wives identify Alex on an E-FIT, albeit by a different name, consolidating Verhœven's theory about Alex. Another murder of a hotel owner in Toulouse, Jacqueline Zanette, a middle aged women, leaves Verhœven puzzled. They trace Alex's current residence to a rental accommodation run by a landlady who informs them about Alex's preterm annulment of the rental contract sighting 'family problems' and of moving out luggage ensuite, a few days prior. This as well as Alex's luggage traced to a storage unit in Paris, both prove to be dead ends.

Alex on the other hand returns to Paris and arranges a dinner date with Felix Maniere. She seduces him and kills him (her fifth murder) at his own residence. Alex then makes plans to abscond to Germany and hitchhikes a ride with truck driver Robert Praderie. Upset by her decision of abandoning her hometown Paris, she commits her sixth murder (Robert) and returns to Paris and instead decides to reroute her itinerary, booking a flight to Switzerland. She checks into a hotel near the airport and calls her brother to schedule a meeting for later that night. She gets inebriated, bangs her head on the wash basin and empties a bottle of barbiturates into her mouth, committing suicide.

Part III

The hotel staff who discover Alex's body recounts seeing her dumping her belongings in a bin in the parking lot. Verhœven finds Alex's secret diary among her effects procured in the garbage bin. The diary puts Alex in a completely different light, for in it, she has shared incidents of being raped by her half brother at the age of 12. It delves into her memories of being prostituted by her brother to the men whose life she ended during her killing rampage. Her autopsy brings to light a barbaric act of genital mutilation by acid, inflicted upon her by one of her rapists. Her brother, Thomus Vasseur, after much denial finally owns up to his doings and is appropriately convicted for his crimes.

== Characters ==
- Commandant Camille Verhœven - Detective Chief Inspector. '4 ft 11in, bald, scrawny, pugnacious, complicated, driven and, irritatingly for his superiors, brilliant'.
- Commissaire Divisionnaire Jean Le Guen - Chief Superintendent.
- Alex Prevost - The female protagonist - beautiful, resourceful, tough - whose character evolves through the parts, from the victim of a brutal kidnapping to a prime suspect in serial murders and ultimately a revengeful victim of pedophile exploitation, prostitution and inhumane suffering. Despite her death in the second part of the novel, her character stays alive through her secret diary.
- Louis Mariana - Camille's assistant.
- Armand - A penny pincher who peppers his conversation with English and works tirelessly like a worker ant.
- Jean-Pierre Trarieux - The kidnapper of Alex, father of Pascal - one of the men murdered by her.
- Thomus Vasseur - Alex's half-brother, her tormentor.

== Reception ==
- 'An absolute gem' Eurocrime.
- 'An invigoratingly scary one-sitting read' The Guardian.
- 'It enthrals at every stage of its unpredictability. Grippingly original' The Times.

== Awards ==
Pierre Lemaitre's first novel Travail soigné originally published in 2006 in the French language, won the "Prix du premier roman du festival de Cognac" - an award for the best debut crime novel. This brought the author national fame throughout France. The English translation of his second novel, Alex won the CWA International Dagger award 2013 and thereby catapulted Pierre Lemaitre's career into international limelight.
