= Camille Verhœven series =

Book series by Pierre Lemaitre

Camille Verhœven series is an oeuvre of the crime genre by French author Pierre Lemaitre. The books initially written in French have been translated into English. The first three books in the series have been nominated to the shortlist in CWA International Dagger award and two have garnered the prestigious award.

== About the author ==
Pierre Lemaitre (born 19 April 1951 in Paris) is a Prix Goncourt-winning French author and a screenwriter. His first novel to be translated into English, Alex, is a translation of the French book of the same title, it won the CWA International Dagger for best crime novel of 2013. In November 2013, he was awarded the Prix Goncourt, France's top literary prize, for Au revoir là-haut, an epic about World War I. His novel Camille won the CWA International Dagger in 2015.

== Books ==
- 2014 Irène (translated from 2006 Travail soigné by Frank Wynne)
- 2013 Alex (translated from 2011 Alex by Frank Wynne)
- 2015 Camille (translated from 2012 Sacrifices by Frank Wynne)

No.	Title	Publisher	Year	ISBN
1	Irène	MacLehose Press	6 March 2014	978-0857052889
The debut novel featuring Commandant Verhœven investigating a series of murders ultimately connected to his lovely wife Irène. It was shortlisted in the CWA International Dagger award 2014 and received positive reviews internationally.
2	Alex	MacLehose Press	1 August 2013	978-0143115625
In this second volume of the series, Commandant Verhœven is running against time to find Alex Prévost who is kidnapped, savagely beaten and suspended from the ceiling of an abandoned warehouse in a wooden cage. It won the CWA International Dagger award 2013 amidst much international acclaim.
3	Camille	MacLehose Press	5 March 2015	978-0857056283
The third and the last in the trilogy, featuring Commandant Camille Verhœven, again faced with the challenge of protecting his love interest amidst possible betrayal within his own police department. It won the CWA International Dagger award 2015

== Awards ==
- 2013 CWA International Dagger, Alex
- 2015 CWA International Dagger, Camille
