= J. J. Abrams =

American filmmaker (born 1966)

- Abrams in 2026
- Born: Jeffrey Jacob Abrams; June 27, 1966 (age 60); New York City, U.S.
- Education: Sarah Lawrence College (BA)
- Occupations: Film director; film producer; screenwriter; composer
- Years active: 1982–present
- Spouse: Katie McGrath (m. 1996)
- Children: 3, including Gracie
- Parents: Gerald W. Abrams (father); Carol Ann Kelvin (mother)

Jeffrey Jacob Abrams (/ˈeɪbrəmz/; born June 27, 1966) is an American filmmaker. He is best known for his work in the genres of action, drama, and science fiction. Abrams wrote and produced films such as Regarding Henry (1991), Forever Young (1992), Armageddon (1998), Cloverfield (2008), Star Trek (2009), Super 8 (2011), and the Star Wars sequels The Force Awakens (2015) and The Rise of Skywalker (2019). Abrams's films have grossed more than $4 billion.

Abrams has created numerous television series, including Felicity (co-creator, 1998–2002), Alias (2001–2006), Lost (co-creator, 2004–2010), Fringe (co-creator, 2008–2013), and Duster (co-creator, 2025). He won two Emmy Awards for Lost: Outstanding Directing for a Drama Series and Outstanding Drama Series.

His directorial film work includes Mission: Impossible III (2006), Star Trek (2009), Super 8 (2011), and Star Trek Into Darkness (2013). He also directed, co-produced, and co-wrote The Force Awakens (2015), the seventh episode of the Star Wars Skywalker Saga and the first film of the sequel trilogy. The film is his highest grossing, the seventh-highest-grossing film of all time not adjusted for inflation, as well as the most expensive film ever made. He returned to Star Wars by executive producing The Last Jedi (2017) and directing, co-producing, and co-writing The Rise of Skywalker (2019).

Abrams's frequent collaborators include producer Bryan Burk; producer/directors Damon Lindelof and Tommy Gormley; actors Greg Grunberg, Simon Pegg, Amanda Foreman, and Keri Russell; composers Michael Giacchino and John Williams; writers Alex Kurtzman and Roberto Orci, cinematographers Dan Mindel and Larry Fong; editors Maryann Brandon and Mary Jo Markey; and violinist Charlie Bisharat.

== Early life ==
Abrams was born on June 27, 1966, in New York City, to veteran television producer Gerald W. Abrams and Carol Ann Abrams (née Kelvin; 1942–2012), a Peabody Award-winning television executive producer as well as an author and law academic. His sister is the screenwriter Tracy Rosen. His father worked at CBS in Midtown Manhattan the year prior to Abrams's birth. By 1971, the family had relocated to Los Angeles. His mother worked as a real estate agent while Abrams and his sister were at school.

Abrams attended Palisades High School and graduated in 1984. He planned on going to art school rather than a traditional college, but he ultimately attended Sarah Lawrence College in Yonkers, New York, graduating in 1988 with a Bachelor of Arts.

== Career ==
=== Early career ===
Abrams's first job in the movie business was at age 16 when he wrote the music for Don Dohler's 1982 horror movie Nightbeast. During his senior year at college, he teamed with Jill Mazursky, the daughter of award-winning writer/director Paul Mazursky, to write a feature film treatment. Purchased by Touchstone Pictures, the treatment was the basis for Taking Care of Business, Abrams's first produced film, which starred Charles Grodin and James Belushi and was directed by Academy Award winner Arthur Hiller. He followed with Regarding Henry, starring Harrison Ford, and Forever Young, starring Mel Gibson. He also co-wrote with Mazursky the script for the comedy Gone Fishin' starring Joe Pesci and Danny Glover.

In 1994, he was part of the "Propellerheads" with Rob Letterman, Loren Soman, and Andy Waisler. The Propellerheads were a group of Sarah Lawrence alums experimenting with computer animation technology. They were contracted by Jeffrey Katzenberg to develop animation for the film Shrek. Abrams worked on the screenplay for the 1998 film Armageddon with producer Jerry Bruckheimer and director Michael Bay. That same year, he made his first foray into television with Felicity, which ran for four seasons on The WB Network, serving as the series' co-creator (with Matt Reeves) and executive producer. He also composed its opening theme music.

=== 2000s ===
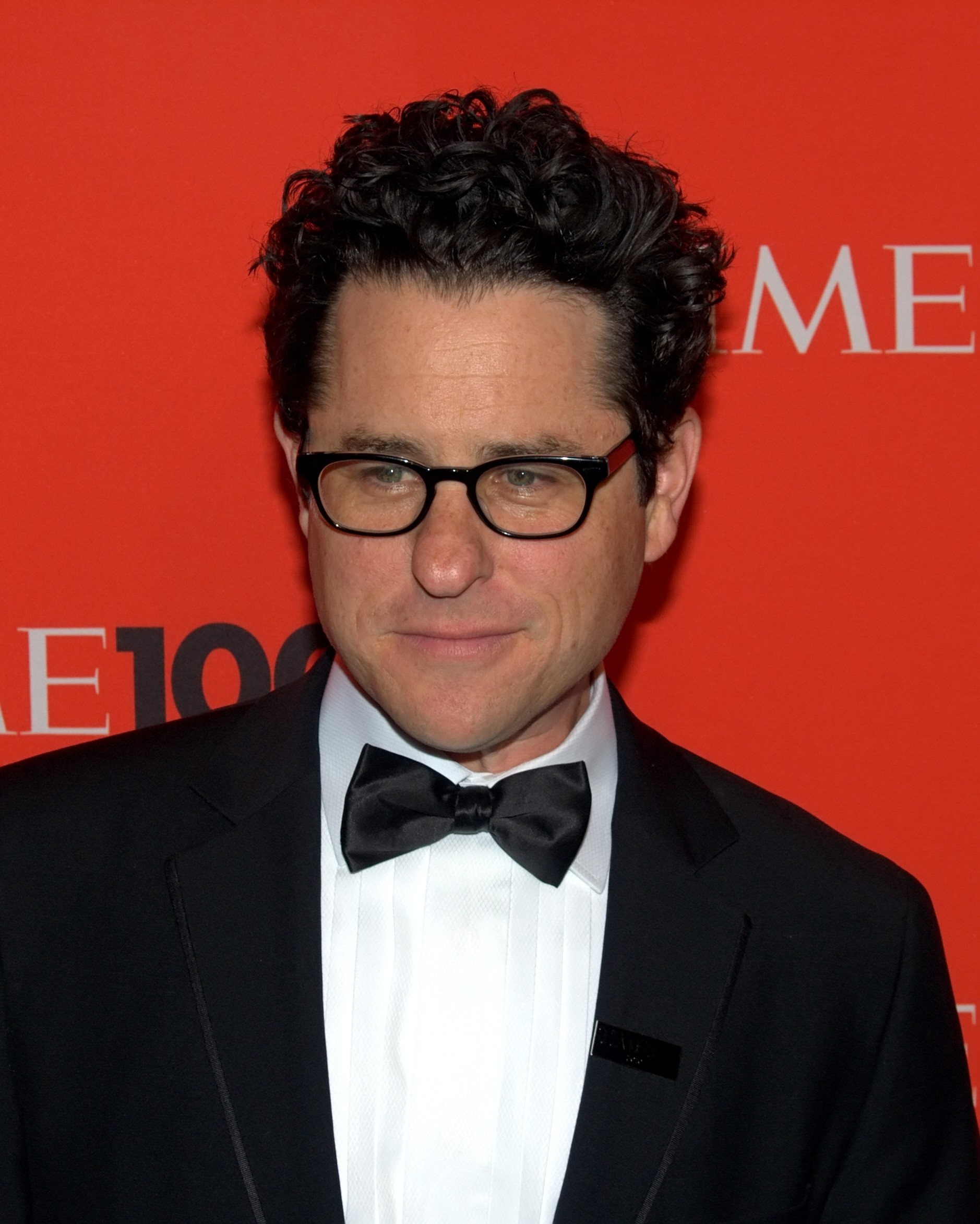
Abrams at the 2010 Time 100 Gala in Manhattan

Under his production company, Bad Robot, which he founded in 2001, Abrams created and executive-produced ABC's Alias and is co-creator (along with Damon Lindelof and Jeffrey Lieber) and was executive producer of Lost. As with Felicity, Abrams also composed the opening theme music for Alias and Lost. Abrams directed and wrote the two-part pilot for Lost and remained active producer for the first half of the season. Also in 2001, Abrams co-wrote and produced the horror-thriller Joy Ride. In 2006, he served as executive producer of What About Brian and Six Degrees, also on ABC. He also co-wrote the teleplay for Lost's third-season premiere "A Tale of Two Cities" and the same year, he made his feature directorial debut with Mission: Impossible III, starring Tom Cruise. Abrams spoke at the TED conference in 2007.

In 2008, Abrams produced the monster movie Cloverfield, which Matt Reeves directed. In 2009, he directed the science fiction film Star Trek, which he produced with Lost co-creator Damon Lindelof. While it was speculated that they would be writing and producing an adaptation of Stephen King's The Dark Tower series of novels, they publicly stated in November 2009 that they were no longer looking to take on that project. In 2008, Abrams co-created, executive produced, and co-wrote (along with Roberto Orci and Alex Kurtzman) the FOX science fiction series Fringe, for which he also composed the theme music. He was featured in the 2009 MTV Movie Awards 1980s-style digital short "Cool Guys Don't Look at Explosions", with Andy Samberg and Will Ferrell, in which he plays a keyboard solo. NBC picked up Abrams's Undercovers as its first new drama series for the 2010–11 season.

=== 2010s ===
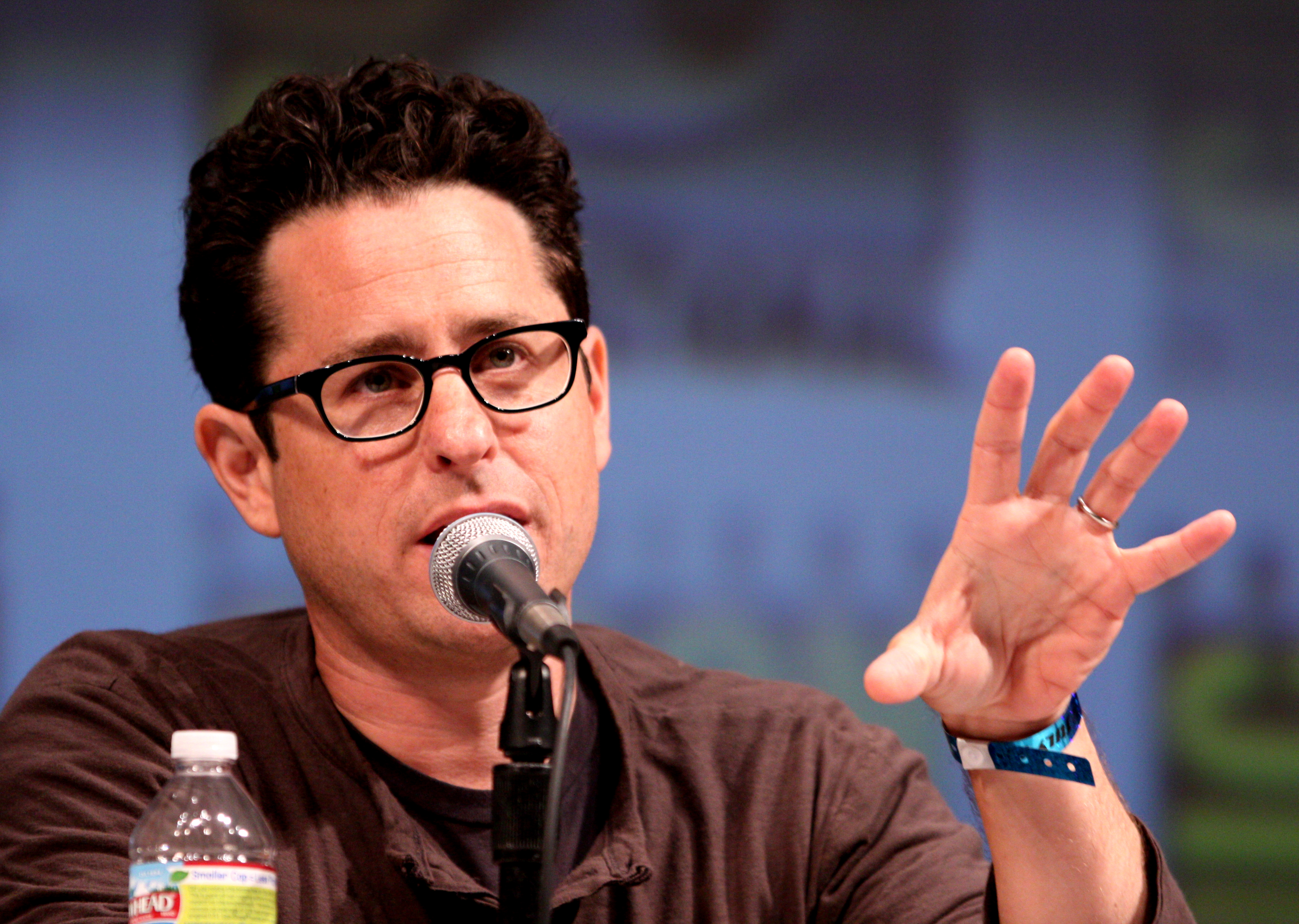
Abrams speaking at San Diego Comic-Con in mid-2010

Abrams wrote and directed the Paramount science fiction thriller Super 8, starring Joel Courtney and Elle Fanning, while co-producing with Steven Spielberg and Bryan Burk; it was released on June 10, 2011.

Abrams directed the sequel to Star Trek, Star Trek Into Darkness, released in May 2013. The film was interpreted as a loose remake of Star Trek II: The Wrath of Khan. Critics generally reacted positively to the film, while Nicholas Meyer, the director of The Wrath of Khan, called it a "gimmick". Abrams was criticized for the film's treatment of classic villain Khan Noonien Singh (Benedict Cumberbatch). Many felt that much of the character, originally played by Mexican actor Ricardo Montalbán, had been lost, especially his ethnic identity. (Note: Khan is an explicitly non-white character in the Star Trek canon, introduced as a Sikh and former ruler of much of eastern Eurasia.) Two years after the film's release, Abrams said of the film:

There were certain things I was unsure of. ... Any movie ... has a fundamental conversation happening during it. And [for Into Darkness,] I didn't have it... [The weakness of the plot] was not anyone's fault but mine. ... [The script] was a little bit of a collection of scenes that were written by my friends ... And yet, I found myself frustrated by my choices, and unable to hang my hat on an undeniable thread of the main story. So then I found myself on that movie basically tap-dancing as well as I could to try and make the sequences as entertaining as possible. ... I would never say that I don't think that the movie ended up working. But I feel like it didn't work as well as it could have, had I made some better decisions before we started shooting.

Abrams was known for a distinctive visual style, involving heavy use of lens flare as an aesthetic choice, despite admitting they were sometimes overused. He grew out of the habit after Star Trek Into Darkness, partly because his wife, Katie McGrath, urged him to.

On January 25, 2013, Disney and Lucasfilm introduced Abrams as director and producer of Star Wars: The Force Awakens, the seventh entry in the Star Wars film saga, with Bryan Burk and Bad Robot producing the film. Following this news, speculation arose as to Abrams's future with Paramount Pictures, under which he had released all of his previous feature work as a director, and which had a first-look deal with his company, Bad Robot. Paramount vice-chairman Rob Moore stated that Abrams would continue to have a hand in the Star Trek and Mission: Impossible franchises going forward. On October 29, 2013, S., a novel written by Doug Dorst based on a concept by Abrams, was released.

Abrams directed, produced, and co-wrote the screenplay for The Force Awakens, which opened in theaters on December 18, 2015. Despite its strong box office performance and positive reviews, the film was considered by some, including Star Wars creator George Lucas, to be too similar to the original 1977 film. In 2016, Abrams responded towards these complaints, stating: "What was important for me was introducing brand new characters using relationships that were embracing the history that we know to tell a story that is new — to go backwards to go forwards". (Note: In 2017, Abrams said he would not do more remakes or reboots, to instead focus on his own creations, saying: "You know, I do think that if you're telling a story that is not moving anything forward, not introducing anything that's relevant, that's not creating a new mythology or an extension of it, then a complete remake of something feels like a mistake.")

Abrams returned as producer for Star Trek Beyond, released in 2016. In 2016, he also produced The Cloverfield Paradox, a sequel to 10 Cloverfield Lane, which was released on Netflix in February 2018. Also in 2018, Abrams produced Overlord, a horror film set behind German enemy lines in World War II and directed by Julius Avery. Abrams also produced the fourth, fifth, and sixth Mission: Impossible films.

In September 2017, Abrams returned to direct and co-write Star Wars: The Rise of Skywalker with Chris Terrio. The film was released in December 2019 and received mixed reviews from critics and fans, while audience reactions were also mixed.

In September 2019, Abrams and his Bad Robot company signed a $250 million five-year deal with WarnerMedia, including HBO and Warner Bros. Pictures. In 2019, Abrams made his debut as a writer for Marvel Comics, co-authoring the company's title Spider-Man from September of that year with his son Henry. The first issue of the comic includes the death of Mary Jane Watson, and a twelve-year time shift, with the series' protagonist being Ben Parker, son of Peter Parker and Mary Jane.

=== 2020s ===
In April 2020, it was announced that Abrams would be developing three new shows for HBO Max: Duster, Overlook, and Justice League Dark. By July 2025, Duster had been canceled after one season.

Abrams was one of the producers of an animated short film of The Boy, the Mole, the Fox and the Horse, shown on BBC One and BBC iPlayer at Christmas 2022.

Abrams served as executive producer and co-creator of a new Batman animated series titled Batman: Caped Crusader alongside Matt Reeves and Bruce Timm. The production team created ten episodes, which premiered August 1, 2024.

On May 8, 2024, it was announced that Abrams would write and direct an untitled new film, with Glen Powell in early talks to star in the project with Bad Robot signing on as the production company. The film, eventually titled The Great Beyond, is set to be released in theatres on October 1, 2027, by Warner Bros. Bad Robot's five-year deal with Warner Bros. was also extended in August 2024, although it was expected to be less expensive than the previous agreement with future projects having significant budget cuts.

Future projects include a Hot Wheels film adaptation and an animated film based on Dr. Seuss' Oh, the Places You'll Go!.

=== Unrealized projects ===
J. J. Abrams has developed many film and television projects over his career that never made it past the development or pre-production stages.

=== Bad Robot ===
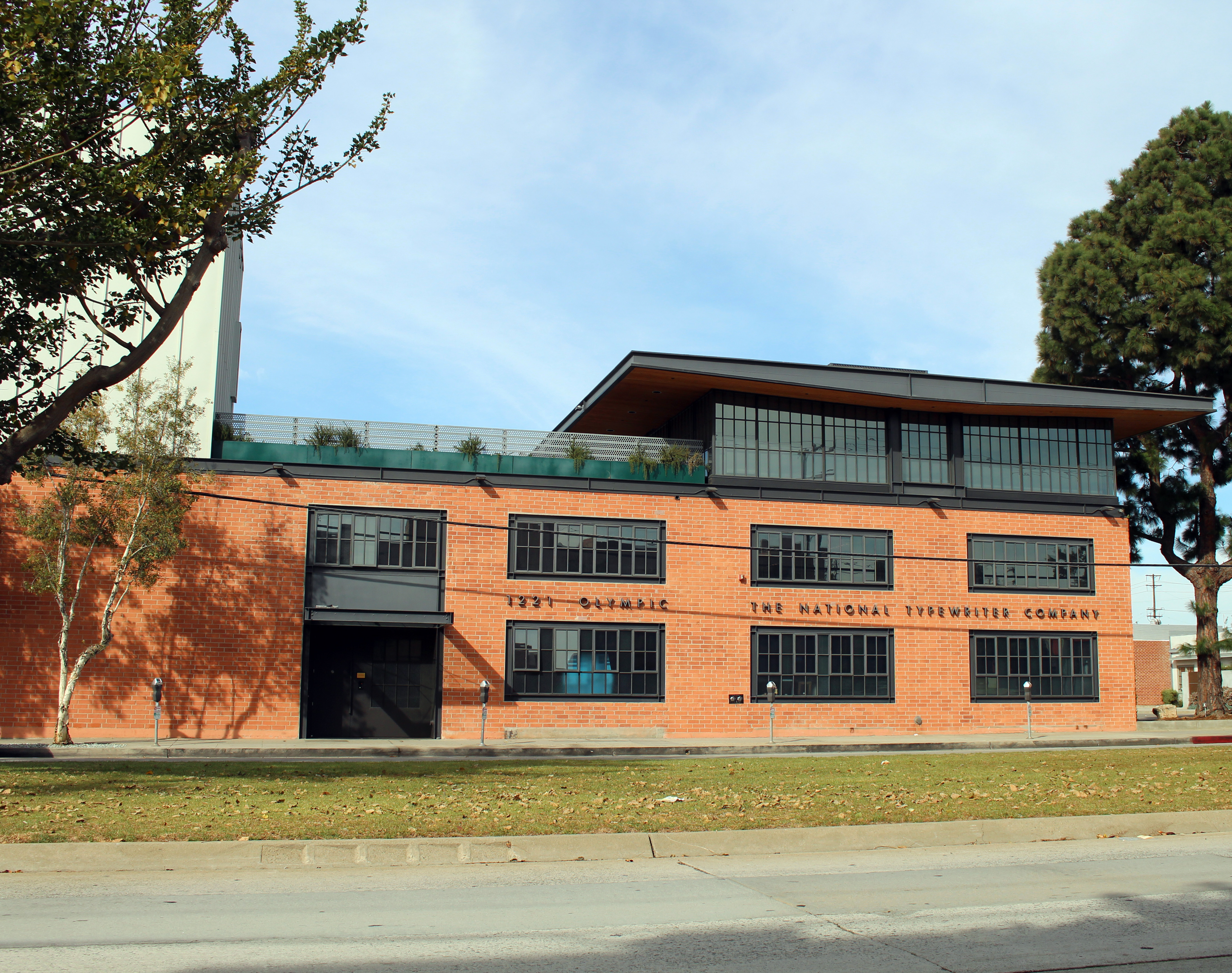
Bad Robot's Santa Monica headquarters

In 2001, Abrams founded his own production company, Bad Robot, in association with Paramount Pictures and Warner Bros. Pictures. Initially a television production company under Touchstone Television, Bad Robot would branch out into film production, with the first movie to be produced under the Bad Robot name being Joy Ride (2001). Bad Robot is well known for Lost, the Star Trek Kelvin timeline films, three Mission: Impossible films, the Cloverfield franchise, and the Star Wars sequel trilogy.

== Personal life ==
Abrams is married to public relations executive Katie McGrath and has three children. His daughter, Gracie Abrams, is a pop singer-songwriter. He resides in Pacific Palisades, Los Angeles, California. He is Jewish and his wife is Catholic.

Abrams serves on the Creative Council of Represent.Us, a nonpartisan anti-corruption organization and the Motion Picture & Television Fund (MPTF) Board of Governors. It was also reported that he attended the 2024 Democratic National Convention in Chicago.

In September 2024, Abrams signed a letter along with over 125 other Hollywood professionals urging California governor Gavin Newsom to sign AI safety bill SB 1047.

== Filmography ==
=== Film ===
| Year | Title | Credited as | | |
| Year | Title | Director | Writer | Producer |
|---|---|---|---|---|
| 1990 | Taking Care of Business | No | Yes | No |
| 1991 | Regarding Henry | No | Yes | Co-producer |
| 1992 | Forever Young | No | Yes | Executive |
| 1995 | Shrek – I Feel Good Animation Test | No | Yes | No |
| 1997 | Gone Fishin' | No | Yes | No |
| 1998 | Armageddon | No | Yes | No |
| 2001 | Joy Ride | No | Yes | Yes |
| 2006 | Mission: Impossible III | Yes | Yes | No |
| 2009 | Star Trek | Yes | No | Yes |
| 2011 | Super 8 | Yes | Yes | Yes |
| 2013 | Star Trek Into Darkness | Yes | No | Yes |
| 2015 | Star Wars: The Force Awakens | Yes | Yes | Yes |
| 2019 | Star Wars: The Rise of Skywalker | Yes | Yes | Yes |
| 2027 | The Great Beyond | Yes | Yes | Yes |

Producer only

- The Pallbearer (1996)
- The Suburbans (1999)
- Cloverfield (2008)
- Morning Glory (2010)
- Mission: Impossible – Ghost Protocol (2011)
- Mission: Impossible – Rogue Nation (2015)
- 10 Cloverfield Lane (2016)
- Star Trek Beyond (2016)
- The Cloverfield Paradox (2018)
- Mission: Impossible – Fallout (2018)
- Overlord (2018)
- Lou (2022)
- The Boy, the Mole, the Fox and the Horse (2022, short film)
- The Blue Angels (2024)
- Elizabeth Taylor: The Lost Tapes (2024)
- The End of Oak Street (2026)
- Skeletons (2027)
- Oh, the Places You'll Go! (2028)

Executive producer

- Infinitely Polar Bear (2014)
- Star Wars: The Last Jedi (2017)

Acting credits

| Year | Title | Role | Notes | Ref. |
|---|---|---|---|---|
| 1991 | Regarding Henry | Delivery Boy | | |
| 1993 | Six Degrees of Separation | Doug | | |
| 1996 | Diabolique | Video Photographer #2 | | |
| 1999 | The Suburbans | Rock Journalist | | |
| 2015 | Star Wars: The Force Awakens | "Jabba Flow" performance | Vocal cameo | |
| 2017 | The Disaster Artist | Himself | | |
| 2019 | Love, Antosha | Himself | Documentary film | |
| 2019 | Star Wars: The Rise of Skywalker | D-O | Voice | |
| 2024 | Music by John Williams | Himself | Documentary film | |

Other roles

| Year | Title | Role | Ref. |
|---|---|---|---|
| 1982 | Nightbeast | Composer / Sound effects composer | |
| 1995 | Casper | Uncredited rewrites | |
| 2006 | Mission: Impossible III | Digital artist: Industrial Light & Magic | |
| 2008 | Iron Man | Uncredited rewrites | |
| 2026 | The Mandalorian and Grogu | Special Thanks | |
| 2027 | The Great Beyond | Composer | |

=== Television ===
| Year | Title | Credited as | | | | | Notes |
| Year | Title | Creator | Director | Writer | Executive Producer | Theme Composer | Notes |
|---|---|---|---|---|---|---|---|
| 1998–2002 | Felicity | Yes | Yes | Yes | Yes | Yes | Director (2 episodes) / Writer (23 episodes) |
| 2001–06 | Alias | Yes | Yes | Yes | Yes | Yes | Director (3 episodes) / Writer (13 episodes) |
| 2004–10 | Lost | Yes | Yes | Yes | Yes | Yes | Director (2 episodes) / Writer (3 episodes) |
| 2006 | Jimmy Kimmel Live! | No | Yes | No | No | No | Episode: "4.269" |
| 2007 | The Office | No | Yes | No | No | No | Episode: "Cocktails" |
| 2008–13 | Fringe | Yes | No | Yes | Yes | Yes | Writer (6 episodes) |
| 2010 | Undercovers | Yes | Yes | Yes | Yes | No | Director (1 episode) / Writer (3 episodes) |
| 2011–16 | Person of Interest | No | No | No | Yes | Yes | |
| 2012 | Alcatraz | No | No | No | Yes | Yes | |
| 2012–14 | Revolution | No | No | No | Yes | Yes | |
| 2013–14 | Almost Human | No | No | No | Yes | Yes | |
| 2025 | Duster | Yes | No | Yes | Yes | Yes | Writer (3 episodes) |

Executive producer only

- What About Brian (2006–07)
- Six Degrees (2006–07)
- Believe (2014)
- 11.22.63 (2016) (Miniseries)
- Roadies (2016)
- Westworld (2016–2022)
- Castle Rock (2018–19)
- Little Voice (2020)
- Lovecraft Country (2020)
- Challenger: The Final Flight (2020)
- Lisey's Story (2021) (Miniseries)
- UFO (2021)
- Presumed Innocent (2024–present)
- Batman: Caped Crusader (2024–present)

Acting credits

| Year | Title | Role | Notes |
|---|---|---|---|
| 2012 | Family Guy | Himself | Voice, Episode: "Ratings Guy" |
| 2017 | Nightcap | Himself | Episode: "The Show Might Go on, Part 2" |
| 2017 | Tour de Pharmacy | Himself | TV movie |
| 2021 | The Simpsons | Himself | Episode: "Do Pizza Bots Dream of Electric Guitars" |
| 2022 | Light & Magic | Himself | Documentary series |

=== Theatre ===
Producer

- The Play That Goes Wrong (2017) (Broadway version)
- Derren Brown: Secret (2019) (Broadway version)

== Bibliography ==
- S. (with Doug Dorst, 2013)

== Awards and nominations ==
| Year | Award | Category | Nominated work | Result |
|---|---|---|---|---|
| 1999 | Razzie Award | Worst Screenplay | Armageddon | Nominated |
| 2002 | Emmy Award | Outstanding Writing for a Drama Series | Alias | Nominated |
| 2004 | PGA Award | Best Drama | Alias | Nominated |
| 2005 | ASCAP Film and Television Music Awards | Top TV Series | Lost | Won |
| 2005 | Directors Guild of America | Best Director | Lost | Nominated |
| 2005 | Emmy Award | Outstanding Directing for a Drama Series – Pilot | Lost | Won |
| 2005 | Emmy Award | Outstanding Drama Series | Lost | Won |
| 2005 | Emmy Award | Outstanding Writing for a Drama Series – Pilot | Lost | Nominated |
| 2006 | ASCAP Film and Television Music Awards | Top TV Series | Lost | Won |
| 2006 | PGA Award | Best Drama | Lost | Won |
| 2006 | Writers Guild of America | Dramatic Series | Lost | Won |
| 2007 | Saturn Award | Best Director | Mission: Impossible III | Nominated |
| 2007 | BAFTA | Best International Programme | Lost | Nominated |
| 2007 | PGA Award | Best Drama | Lost | Nominated |
| 2007 | Writers Guild of America | Dramatic Series | Lost | Nominated |
| 2008 | Emmy Award | Outstanding Drama Series | Lost | Nominated |
| 2009 | Emmy Award | Outstanding Drama Series | Lost | Nominated |
| 2009 | Writers Guild of America | Long Form | Fringe | Nominated |
| 2009 | Writers Guild of America | New Series | Fringe | Nominated |
| 2009 | Scream Awards | Best Director | Star Trek | Won |
| 2010 | Saturn Award | Best Director | Star Trek | Nominated |
| 2010 | Empire Awards | Best Director | Star Trek | Nominated |
| 2010 | PGA Award | Theatrical Motion Picture | Star Trek | Nominated |
| 2010 | SFX Awards | Best Director | Star Trek | Won |
| 2010 | Hugo Awards | Best Dramatic Presentation – Long Form | Star Trek | Nominated |
| 2010 | Emmy Award | Outstanding Drama Series | Lost | Nominated |
| 2011 | Scream Award | Best Director | Super 8 | Nominated |
| 2011 | Scream Award | Best Scream-Play | Super 8 | Won |
| 2011 | BAM Awards | Best Director | Super 8 | Nominated |
| 2011 | BAM Awards | Best Screenplay | Super 8 | Won |
| 2012 | Saturn Award | Best Director | Super 8 | Won |
| 2012 | Saturn Award | Best Writing | Super 8 | Nominated |
| 2012 | SFX Awards | Best Director | Super 8 | Nominated |
| 2013 | PGA Award | Norman Lear Achievement Award in Television | | Won |
| 2014 | Saturn Award | Best Director | Star Trek Into Darkness | Nominated |
| 2016 | Saturn Award | Best Director | Star Wars: The Force Awakens | Nominated |
| 2016 | Saturn Award | Best Writing | Star Wars: The Force Awakens | Won |
| 2016 | Empire Awards | Best Director | Star Wars: The Force Awakens | Won |
| 2016 | Empire Awards | Best Sci-Fi/Fantasy Film | Star Wars: The Force Awakens | Won |
| 2016 | Empire Awards | Best Film | Star Wars: The Force Awakens | Nominated |
| 2016 | Critics' Choice Movie Awards | Best Picture | Star Wars: The Force Awakens | Nominated |
| 2016 | Jupiter Awards | Best International Film | Star Wars: The Force Awakens | Won |
| 2016 | Hugo Awards | Best Dramatic Presentation, Long Form | Star Wars: The Force Awakens | Nominated |
