= See You up There =

See You Up There
- Film Poster
- Au revoir là-haut
- Directed by: Albert Dupontel
- Written by: Albert Dupontel; Pierre Lemaitre
- Based on: Au revoir là-haut by Pierre Lemaitre
- Produced by: Catherine Bozorgan
- Starring: Albert Dupontel; Nahuel Pérez Biscayart; Laurent Lafitte; Niels Arestrup; Mélanie Thierry; Émilie Dequenne
- Cinematography: Vincent Mathias
- Edited by: Christophe Pinel
- Music by: Christophe Julien
- Production companies: Gaumont; Stadenn Prod; Manchester Films
- Distributed by: Gaumont
- Release dates: 22 August 2017 (Angoulême); 25 October 2017
- Running time: 117 min
- Country: France
- Language: French
- Budget: $21.2 million
- Box office: $16.1 million

See You Up There (French: Au revoir là-haut) is a 2017 French historical war drama film written and directed by and starring Albert Dupontel, adapted from the 2013 novel The Great Swindle (Au revoir là-haut in French) by Pierre Lemaitre.

== Plot ==
In November 1918, a few days before the Armistice, Edouard Péricourt saves Albert Maillard's life. The two men have nothing in common but the war. Lieutenant Pradelle, by ordering a senseless assault, destroys their lives while binding them as companions in misfortune. On the ruins of the carnage of WWI, condemned to live, the two attempt to survive. Thus, as Pradelle is about to make a fortune with the war victims' corpses, Albert and Edouard mount a monumental scam with the bereaved families' commemoration and with a nation's hero worship.

== Cast ==
- Nahuel Pérez Biscayart as Édouard Péricourt
- Albert Dupontel as Albert Maillard
- Laurent Lafitte as Captain Henri d'Aulnay-Pradelle
- Niels Arestrup as President Marcel Péricourt
- Émilie Dequenne as Madeleine Péricourt
- Mélanie Thierry as Pauline
- Philippe Uchan as Labourdin, mayor of the 8th arrondissement of Paris
- Héloïse Balster as Louise
- André Marcon as the gendarme officer
- Kyan Khojandi as Dupré
- Michel Vuillermoz as Joseph Merlin
- Carole Franck as Sister Hortense
- Gilles Gaston-Dreyfus as the mayor at the cemetery
- Jacques Mateu as the prefect
- Philippe Duquesne as the station officer
- Denis Podalydès as the minister (voice)
- Matthieu Sausset as sergeant at Côte 113
- Frédéric Épaud as catalogue deliveryman (as Fred Épaud)
- Axelle Simon as Madame Belmont
- Augustin Jacob as the Paris surgeon
- Frans Boyer as officer at Côte 113
- Éloïse Genet as Cécile
- Bing Yin as Chinese 1 (as Yin Bing)
- Cheng Xiaoxing as Chinese 2 (as Xiaoxing Cheng)
- Gustave Kervern (credited for deleted scenes)
- Nicolas Lormeau (credited for deleted scenes)

== Production ==
Movie production started in March 2016 in the region of the Vexin plateau over the Seine river valley.

== Reception ==
On review aggregator Rotten Tomatoes, the film holds an approval rating of 93%, based on 15 reviews with an average rating of 7.5/10.

Jordan Mintzer from The Hollywood Reporter wrote that "the film features a handful of jaw-dropping moments — such as an excruciating battle across no man's land — held together by a strong cast, including BPM (Beats Per Minute) star Nahuel Perez Biscayart as a disfigured artist hidden behind an array of exquisitely ornamental masks. But condensing nearly 600 pages of story into a two-hour movie proves increasingly difficult as too many plot points take away from all the visual splendor, while the characters hardly have time to be drawn out." Peter Debruge writing for the Variety magazine said: "...simultaneously grand and eccentric, and though it sometimes struggles to sustain its identity amid such a strange mix of tones, the film holds together via DP Vincent Mathias’ dramatic widescreen lensing and a splendid, understated score from Christophe Julien." Jordi Costa from the Spanish newspaper El País stated: "Albert Dupontel knows that a black comedy doesn't only have to be cynical and his film finds its soul in the masks that communicate the emotions of one of his characters."

=== Accolades ===
See You Up There earned 13 nominations at the 43rd César Awards, winning 5 awards. The film also won other awards.

Award	Subject	Nominee	Result
César Awards	Best Adaptation	Albert Dupontel; Pierre Lemaitre	Won
César Awards	Best Cinematography	Vincent Mathias	Won
César Awards	Best Production Design	Pierre Queffelean	Won
César Awards	Best Costume Design	Mimi Lempicka	Won
César Awards	Best Director	Albert Dupontel	Won
César Awards	Best Actor	Albert Dupontel	Nominated
César Awards	Best Supporting Actress	Mélanie Thierry	Nominated
César Awards	Best Supporting Actor	Niels Arestrup	Nominated
César Awards	Best Supporting Actor	Laurent Lafitte	Nominated
César Awards	Best Original Music	Christophe Julien	Nominated
César Awards	Best Sound	Jean Minondo; Gurwal Coïc-Gallas; Cyril Holtz; Damien Lazzerini	Nominated
César Awards	Best Editing	Christophe Pinel	Nominated
César Awards	Best Film	Catherine Bozorgan; Albert Dupontel	Nominated
Globes de Cristal Awards	Best Film	Albert Dupontel	Nominated
Globes de Cristal Awards	Best Actor	Albert Dupontel	Nominated
Lumière Awards	Best Cinematography	Vincent Mathias	Nominated
Lumière Awards	Best Film	Albert Dupontel	Nominated
Lumière Awards	Best Screenplay	Albert Dupontel; Pierre Lemaitre	Nominated
Seattle International Film Festival	Best Director (Golden Space Needle Award)	Albert Dupontel	Fifth Place
