= Irène (novel) =

2014 novel by Pierre Lemaitre

Irene
- Cover of Irène
- Author: Pierre Lemaitre
- Original title: Travail soigné
- Translator: Frank Wynne
- Language: English
- Series: Verhœven series
- Genre: Crime fiction
- Publisher: MacLehose Press
- Publication date: March 6, 2014
- Publication place: France
- Media type: Print (hardcover)
- Pages: 398
- ISBN: 978-0-857-05288-9
- Followed by: Alex

Irène (Camille Verhœven Trilogy #1) is a crime novel written by French novelist Pierre Lemaitre. The novel, though originally published in French in 2006, came to be translated into English by Frank Wynne in 2014. It is the first book in the Camille Verhœven series by order of publication but the second to be translated in English after Alex.

It was shortlisted in the CWA International Dagger award 2014 and received positive reviews internationally.

== Plot ==
Commandant Verhœven is happily married, expecting his first child with his lovely wife Irène. A series of unsolved murders starts to put a strain on his relationship. With his personal life in shambles, he further has to deal with the press. Then Verhœven makes a breakthrough discovery: the murders are modelled after the exploits of serial killers from classic works of crime fiction and that the killer has killed before. With time running out, Verhœven realizes that all along he has been the unwitting dupe in The Novelist's plans to create an original work of his own.

== Reception ==
- "Irène gets off to a fast start and races pell-mell to a jaw-dropping conclusion . . . Mr. Lemaitre fires away in a prose style that's like a flurry of short jabs to the solar plexus."―William Grimes, The New York Times
- "Verhœven is a one-of-a-kind detective . . . Not for the faint of heart, this gritty thriller will appeal to fans of Chelsea Cain, for the grisly details, and Fred Vargas, for the French setting and iconoclastic sleuth."― Kirkus Reviews
- "French literary sensation Lemaitre earned comparisons to Stieg Larsson (and a 2013 CWA International Dagger Award) with Alex, a gruesome and twisty mashup of police procedural, thriller, and psychological horror. Its newly translated predecessor might be even better . . . [Irène is] hardly predictable, as [Lemaitre] pushes the pulse-quickening plot toward an ingenious-and shocking-finale."―Library Journal
