= Overcast Media =

Overcast Media Inc.
- Stable release: Overcast Flash Player Version 1.0 / 2008-10-15
- Operating system: Macintosh, Windows XP, Windows Vista, Linux
- Available in: English
- Type: UGC / TV
- License: Freeware
- Website: www.overcastmedia.com

Overcast Media Inc. was a digital media technology company based in Seattle, Washington, United States. Its main product, the Overcast player, was a video player that overlaid user-generated content on television broadcasts and home media. Their service enabled anyone to add their own commentary to television shows, sporting events and movies, while respecting the intellectual property rights of the underlying television show.

== Technology ==
Overcast Media developed a synchronization technology which allowed authors to create commentary over one video source (ex. a digital recording) and allowed consumers to view the commentary in sync with a different video source (ex. a show acquired through Amazon Unbox). This process is called overcasting. Additionally, their synchronization technology worked with many Flash-based players formerly used online. Overcasting handles timing variations found across different sources and file formats. Features included live streaming, storage, transcription, security, editing tools and more.

== Availability and closing ==
Overcast Media shut down shortly after December 31, 2020, following Adobe's discontinuation of Flash Player. The Flash-based player was previously available on their own site and on partner websites such as RiffTrax. Shortly before closing, the client-side software was available only to partners. The service was previously able to be accessed on the Overcast Media homepage. Currently, the domain of overcastmedia.com is defunct and for sale. Users are no longer allowed to access the Flash-based player previously available for Mac, Linux, Windows and Vista. The client-side components were only available for Windows and Vista.
