= Everything I Need to Know I Learned from a Little Golden Book =

Humor book

- First edition
- Author: Diane Muldrow
- Illustrator: Various
- Language: English
- Subject: Humor, behavior
- Published: 2013 (Golden Books)
- Publication place: USA
- Media type: Print (hardback)
- Pages: 88
- ISBN: 9780307977618
- OCLC: 1057575957

Everything I Need to Know I Learned from a Little Golden Book is a 2013 best selling picture book by Diane Muldrow. It is a humorous guide to life that is derived from Little Golden Books stories and their illustrations.

== Reception ==
In a review for School Library Journal, Renee McGrath writes, "The author, the longtime editorial director at Golden Books, has cleverly strung together a collection of images and text from approximately 65 different books into a guide about enjoying life and what's important." Kirkus Reviews describes the book as "Chicken soup for fans of Golden Books". According to Publishers Weekly, "Readers who grew up with Little Golden Books illustrated by the likes of Mary Blair, Tibor Gergely, and Garth Williams will enjoy this optimistic and cheering trip down memory lane."

In a review for the Sydney Morning Herald, Alan Stokes describes the book as "a nostalgic trip with wonderful illustrations", and observes "with the focus on pictures, Muldrow cannot explore the books in greater depth", particularly The Saggy Baggy Elephant, and states Muldrow's summary "belittles Saggy Baggy's positive contribution to the psychological well-being of countless individuals who have felt different or lonely, or struggled with their identity." Radio New Zealand also reviewed the book.

The book is a best seller.
