= S. (Dorst novel) =

2013 novel by Doug Dorst

- The slipcover of S.
- Author: Doug Dorst, J. J. Abrams
- Language: English
- Genre: Mystery, Ergodic
- Publisher: Mulholland Books
- Publication date: October 29, 2013
- Media type: Print (hardback)
- Pages: 472
- ISBN: 0316201642

S. is a 2013 novel written by Doug Dorst and conceived by J. J. Abrams. The novel is unusual in its format, presented as a story within a story. It is composed of the novel Ship of Theseus (by a fictional author), hand-written notes filling the book's margins as a dialogue between two college students hoping to uncover the author's mysterious identity and the novel's secret, plus loose supplementary materials tucked in between the pages.

== Description ==
S. is presented in the form of a novel called Ship of Theseus, written by a fictional, elusive author named V. M. Straka and published in 1949. Beyond the black slipcover with the S. title, no reference is made to Dorst or Abrams, and the only reference to the book's true publishing information appears in fine print inside the back cover. The publication information is printed under a mock-up of a high school library's check-out history of the book, spanning the years 1957 to 2000.

Removed from the slipcover, S. is designed to appear entirely as a copy of the standalone novel Ship of Theseus written by Straka that was borrowed from and never returned to the Laguna Verde High School Library. The pages are worn and yellowed with library stamps in the front and back cover and stains on the pages. The book's spine is labeled with a library sticker marking the novel's location number in the Dewey Decimal Classification.

The novel can be read alone in its entirety. Presented as Straka's nineteenth and final novel before his mysterious death, Ship of Theseus tells the story of an amnesiac on a strange journey to discover himself. In the metafictional narrative, Straka's enigmatic life and death are considered one of the literary world's greatest mysteries and enshrouded by conspiracy theories and claims of espionage and assassination. His identity is indicated to be the subject of much scholarly debate as evidenced by a foreword and footnotes from F. X. Caldeira, described as Straka's chosen translator for many of his books, including Ship of Theseus, though even Caldeira never encountered Straka face-to-face.

A second storyline takes place in the book's margins. Eric is a disgraced graduate student who has spent his life studying Straka and his literary works. Jen is a college senior contemplating the next step of her life. The two begin to trade a copy of Ship of Theseus back and forth without meeting, using the book's margins to carry out discussions about who Straka was by using handwritten notes, arrows, and symbols. The pair hope to solve the mystery of Straka's identity before Eric's graduate professor, who allegedly stole his research and had him expelled, publishes his research on Straka. The hand-written marginalia are not always chronological. Different pen colors and handwriting styles denote the dialogues between the two and how they change on subsequent re-readings of the novel.

A third story happens within Straka's novel and the conversations between Eric and Jen, a story about Straka and Caldeira. This storyline serves as the most hidden and core section of the whole novel and answers the mystery of Straka's disappearance. It reveals the background of the world Straka and Caldeira lived in and the relationship between the novelist and the translator.

Concurrent with Jen and Eric's timeline of reading and annotating the novel, there are postcards, handwritten letters, maps, and photocopied articles and book excerpts physically folded and loosely inserted between the book's bound pages as Jen and Eric provide evidence and clues to each other while exchanging the book.

== Development ==
S. is a collaboration between film producer J. J. Abrams, who came up with the concept for the book, and writer Doug Dorst. Abrams stated that the idea came from finding a book on a bench that had an inscription: "to whomever finds this book please read it and take it somewhere and leave it for someone else to read." Dorst has stated that his idea for the central concept of the story was inspired by two literary mysteries: the Shakespeare authorship question and the controversy over the identity of B. Traven, who wrote several acclaimed and successful novels in the early 20th century but so closely guarded his privacy that his true identity has never been conclusively established. He wrote Ship of Theseus first, intending it to be read on its own merits. The marginal notes and ephemera were added later.

The authors intended the book as a physical object, and not just a story. Abrams noted that "to physically hold it is kind of the point." One reviewer called S. an argument for paying extra for a physical book, "a possessor of wonders that cannot be translated into digital bits."

In August 2013, Abrams' film production company, Bad Robot, released a trailer on YouTube entitled "Stranger", leading to rumors that it could be Abrams' next film or TV project, perhaps even a spin-off to the TV series Lost. It was finally explained to be promoting S., after an official trailer for the book was released in the following month.

== Reception ==
The Guardian called the novel "[...] a brilliant piece of publishing rather than a wholly coherent rethinking of the novel." The Independent was not convinced of the coherence of the novel but recommended it as a worthwhile read regardless. Toronto Star criticized the story within a story but praised the production and design. Chicago Tribune addressed the book as an intriguing experience of holding a real tome, not an e-book.

== See also ==
- Ship of Theseus
- Pale Fire – a 1962 novel by Vladimir Nabokov written in a similar format.
- House of Leaves
