= Sylvia Smith =

British writer of autobiography (1945–2013)

Sylvia Smith (2 May 1945 – 23 February 2013) was a British author known for her volumes of autobiography.

Smith's first title - Misadventures (Canongate, 2001) - covered her life of office work, boyfriends and day-to-day events. The book divided critics and audiences, some believing it to be an elaborate hoax, others praising the deadpan style. Misadventures never achieved best-seller status, but it did sell 15,000 copies. Further books concentrated on specific aspects of Smith's life: Appleby House (2003) covering a year in which she lived in a rented house and My Holidays (2004) detailing her holidays. It is only in the latter book that an event of widespread significance is described as Smith details her experience of the September 11 attacks. She was promoting Misadventures in New York City at the time. Most recently Smith had been working on a book entitled The Men In My Life.

The Guardian described her as a "committed minimalist", and Misadventures as "unusual, deflated, hilarious", with "a certain fascinating banality in these tales of an utterly normal woman, worker, lover and carer. It is a rare glimpse into a life lived quietly and unexceptionally, exactly like millions of others".

Smith died of pulmonary disease, according to her literary agent, Caroline Dawnay.
