= Pierre Lemaitre =

French writer (born 1951)

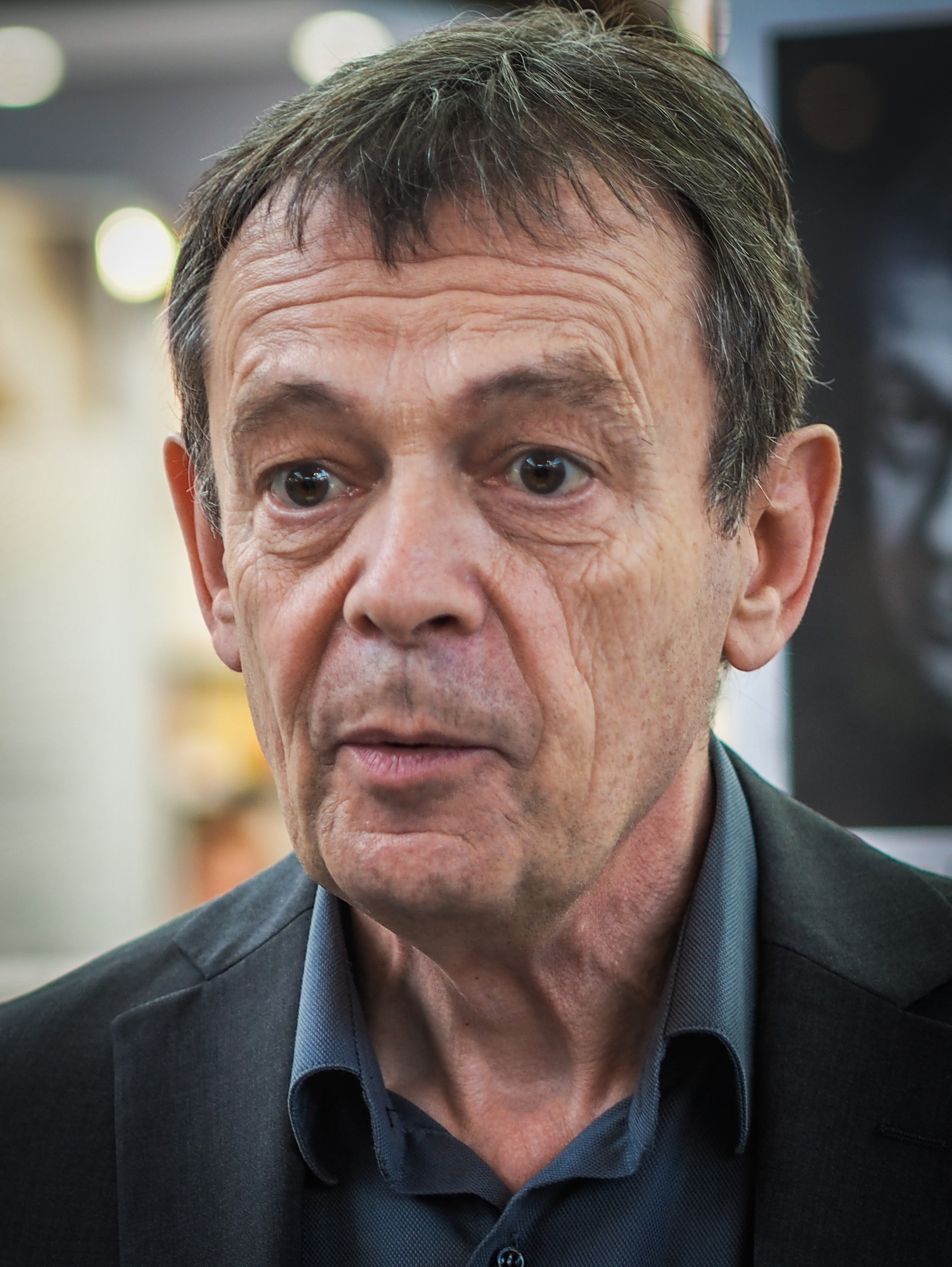
- Pierre Lemaitre - Paris Book Fair - 23 March 2014
- Born: 19 April 1951 (age 75); Paris, France
- Occupations: Author, screenplay writer
- Writing career
- Period: 2006–present
- Genres: Fiction, thriller, mystery, History
- Notable works: Alex; Camille; Au revoir là-haut

Pierre Lemaitre (French pronunciation: [pjɛʁ ləmɛtʁ]; born 19 April 1951) is a French author and a screenwriter, internationally known for crime novels featuring the fictional character Commandant Camille Verhœven.

His first novel translated to English was Alex. It jointly won the CWA International Dagger for best translated crime novel of 2013.

In November 2013, Lemaitre was awarded the Prix Goncourt, France's top literary prize, for Au revoir là-haut (published in English as The Great Swindle), an epic about World War I. His novels Camille and The Great Swindle won the CWA International Dagger in 2015 and 2016 respectively.

== Personal life ==
Pierre Lemaitre worked as a teacher in literature and now devotes his time writing novels and screenplays.

== Bibliography ==
=== Novels ===
Camille Verhœven series:

1. Irène (Travail soigné) (2006), English translation by Frank Wynne, 2014
2. Alex (2011), English translation by Frank Wynne, 2013
3. Les Grands Moyens (2011), reissued in 2013 as Rosy & John
4. Camille (Sacrifices) (2012), English translation by Frank Wynne, 2015

Les Enfants du désastre trilogy:

1. The Great Swindle (Au revoir là-haut) (2013), English translation by Frank Wynne, 2015
2. All Human Wisdom (Couleurs de l'incendie) (2018), English translation 2021
3. Mirror of our Sorrows (Miroir de nos peines) (2020), English translation 2022

Les Années Glorieuses, tetralogy:

1. The Wide World (Le Grand Monde) (February 2022) English translation July 2023
2. Le Silence et la Colère (January 2023)

Stand-alones:

- Blood Wedding (Robe de marié) (2009), English translation by Frank Wynne, 2016
- Inhuman Resources (Cadres noirs) (2010), English translation: by Sam Gordon, 2018
- Three Days and a Life (Trois jours et une vie) (2016), English translation by Frank Wynne, 2017
- The Great Serpent (Le Serpent majuscule) (2021), English translation: 2023

=== Short stories ===
- "Une initiative" (2014)
- "Les Événements de Péronne" (2018)

=== Comics ===
Les Enfants du désastre series:

1. Au revoir là-haut (2016), with Christian De Metter

Camille Verhœven series (with Pascal Bertho, illustrated by Yannick Corboz):

1. Irene (2019), based on novel Irene
2. Rosie (2018), based on novel Rosy & John

=== Non-fiction ===
- Savoir apprendre (1986), with François Maquere, guide
- Dictionnaire amoureux du polar (2020), literature

== Awards and honours ==
- Travail soigné
  - 2006 Prix du premier roman du festival de Cognac, Travail soigné
  - 2009 Prix des lectrices Confidentielles, Travail soigné
  - 2009 Prix Sang d'encre et Prix des lecteurs Goutte de Sang d'encre, Vienne, Travail soigné
  - 2009 Prix du polar francophone de Montigny les Cormeilles, Travail soigné
- Cadres noirs
  - 2010 Prix Le Point du polar européen, Cadres noirs
- Alex
  - 2012 Prix des lecteurs policier du Livre de poche, Alex
  - 2013 CWA International Dagger, Alex (translated by Frank Wynne)
- Au revoir là-haut
  - 2013 Prix des libraires de Nancy Le Point, Au revoir là-haut
  - 2013 Roman français préféré des libraires à la Rentrée, Au revoir là-haut
  - 2013 Prix Goncourt, Au revoir là-haut
  - 2016 CWA International Dagger, The Great Swindle (translated by Frank Wynne)
- Camille
  - 2015 CWA International Dagger, Camille (translated by Frank Wynne)

== Adaptations ==
- See You Up There (2017), film directed by Albert Dupontel, based on novel The Great Swindle
- Three Days and a Life (2019), film directed by Nicolas Boukhrief, based on novel Three Days and a Life
- Inhuman Resources (2020), miniseries directed by Ziad Doueiri, based on novel Inhuman Resources
- Couleurs de l'incendie (2022), film adapted from his eponymous 2018 novel (English title: All Human Wisdom), directed by Clovis Cornillac
