= Ahmed Saadawi =

Iraqi writer and film maker

- أحمد سعداوي
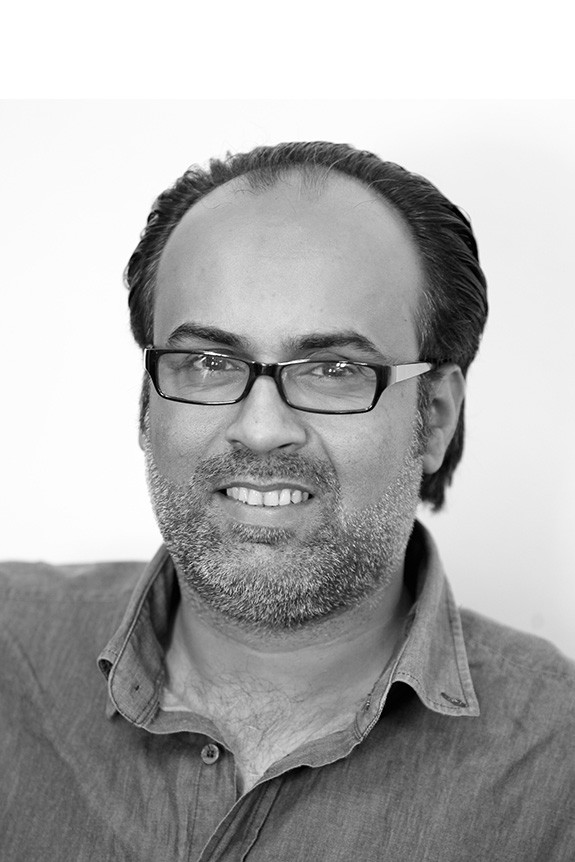
- Born: 1973 (age 52–53); Iraq
- Occupation: Novelist
- Writing career
- Notable work: Frankenstein in Baghdad
- Notable awards: International Prize for Arabic Fiction (2014)

Ahmed Saadawi (born 1973, Arabic: أحمد سعداوي) is an Iraqi novelist, poet, screenwriter and documentary film maker. He won the 2014 International Prize for Arabic Fiction for Frankenstein in Baghdad. He lives and works in Baghdad.

== Awards and honours ==
- 2010 Beirut39 project, one of 39 chosen participants
- 2014 International Prize for Arabic Fiction, winner for Frankenstein in Baghdad
- 2017 Grand prix de l'Imaginaire, Foreign-language novel winner for Frankenstein in Baghdad

== Bibliography ==
- 2000 Anniversary of Bad Songs (poetry)
- 2004 The Beautiful Country (novel)
- 2008 Indeed He Dreams or Plays or Dies (novel)
- 2013 Frankenstein in Baghdad (novel)
- 2017 The Chalk Door (novel)
- 2018 The Bare Face Inside the Dream (short story collection)
- 2018 A Sense of Remorse (short story included in Baghdad Noir)
- 2019 The Diary of D (novel)
