= Complete Convenient =

2013 novel by Ketan Bhagat

Complete/Convenient
- First edition
- Author: Ketan Bhagat
- Language: English
- Genre: Fiction
- Publisher: Srishti Publishers, New Delhi
- Publication date: May 2013
- Publication place: India
- Media type: Print (Paperback)
- Pages: 384
- ISBN: 978-93-8034-992-3

Complete/Convenient is a 2013 novel by Indian author Ketan Bhagat, an ex-presenter with Indian broadcaster Doordarshan. The book was published by Srishti publications.

Complete/Convenient focuses on the life an emotional Non-Resident Indian named Kabir, who faces new challenges when he marries and then is transferred to Australia. Bhagat started writing the book in 2010, after he himself had returned from a three-year stint in Australia.

Bhagat, who holds and MBA, is the younger brother of established author Chetan Bhagat. Ketan Bhagat was interviewed by several magazines. The book has received generally favourable reviews, although it has been criticized for being too long. About 10,000 copies were sold in the first two months after publication.
