= Diane Muldrow =

American Author and Editor

Diane Muldrow is an American author and former editorial director at Golden Books. Her work as an author includes a New York Times bestselling series written for adults that began with Everything I Need to Know I Learned from a Little Golden Book.

== Biography ==
Muldrow graduated from Ohio University with Bachelor's in Fine Arts and Magazine Journalism. Immediately following graduation, she worked as a dancer and actor in New York City. While working as a junior editor for Golden Books, she occasionally wrote licensed books for Disney and Barbie. Her first original work, The Happy Book, an interactive novelty book with sensory elements, was published in 1999 by Scholastic. In the same year, Muldrow returned to work at Golden Books as an editor, and planned on creating a series focused on teen girls with fellow editor Bonnie Bader. The series later materialized with Muldrow as the author and Bader as the editor as the Dish series

In 2013, she published Everything I Need to Know I Learned from a Little Golden Book, the first book in a series written for adults. She has since published four other titles in the series: Everything I Need to Know About Christmas I Learned from a Little Golden Book (2014), Everything I Need to Know About Love I Learned from a Little Golden Book (2014), Everything I Need to Know About Disney I Learned from a Little Golden Book (2015), and Everything I Need to Know About Family I Learned from a Little Golden Book (2017).

Muldrow also edited Golden Legacy: The Story of Little Golden Books, a history of the series by children's literature historian Leonard S. Marcus, which was first published in 2007 and reissued in 2017. For the 75th anniversary of the Little Golden Book series in 2017, Muldrow and Marcus participated in the Golden Legacy National Author Tour.

In 2019, she stepped down as editorial director at Golden Books.

== Selected works ==
- The Happy Book (1999), Scholastic
- We Planted a Tree (2010), Penguin Random House
- Where Do Giggles Come From (2011), Penguin Random House
- The Pink Book (2020), Penguin Random House
- The Pokey Little Puppy's Special Spring Day (2021), Penguin Random House
- The Fairies' Ball (2021), Penguin Random House
- Meowl-o-Ween (2023), Penguin Random House

=== Dish series ===
- Stirring It Up (Dish #1, 2002), Grosset & Dunlap
- Turning up the Heat (Dish #2, 2007), Penguin Random House
- Boiling Point (Dish #3, 2007), Penguin Random House
- Into the Mix (Dish #4, 2007), Penguin Random House
- Truth Without the Trimmings (Dish #5, 2007), Penguin Random House
- On the Back Burner (Dish #6, 2003), Grosset & Dunlap
- Recipe for Trouble (Dish #7, 2003), Grosset & Dunlap
- Lights! Camera! Cook! (Dish #8, 2007), Penguin Random House
- Sweet-and-Sour Summer (Dish #9, 2007), Penguin Random House
- A Measure of Thanks (Dish #10, 2007), Penguin Random House
- Winner Takes the Cake (Dish #11, 2007), Penguin Random House
- Deep Freeze (Dish #12, 2007), Penguin Random House

=== Everything I Need to Know series ===
- Everything I Need to Know I Learned from a Little Golden Book (2014), Penguin Random House
- Everything I Need to Know About Christmas I Learned from a Little Golden Book (2014), Penguin Random House
- Everything I Need to Know About Love I Learned from a Little Golden Book (2014), Penguin Random House
- Everything I Need to Know about Disney I Learned from a Little Golden Book (2015), Penguin Random House
- Everything I Need to Know about Family I Learned from a Little Golden Book (2017), Penguin Random House
