= The Burning Dark =

2014 novel by Adam Christopher

- First image
- Author: Adam Christopher
- Cover artist: Will Staehle
- Language: English
- Series: Spider War
- Genre: Science fiction, horror
- Published: 2014, Tor Books (US); Titan Books (UK)
- Publication place: United States; United Kingdom
- Media type: Print, ebook
- Pages: 336 pages
- ISBN: 0765335085
- Followed by: The Machine Awakes

The Burning Dark (originally titled Shadow's Call) is a 2014 science fiction horror novel by Adam Christopher. The novel was published in the United States and the United Kingdom on March 25, 2014 through Tor Books and Titan Books, respectively. The Burning Dark is the first book in the Spider War trilogy but can also be read as a stand-alone novel.

While writing the novel, Christopher was inspired by the Lost Cosmonauts conspiracy theory, Blake's 7, and Japanese mythology. Christopher has stated that while Spider War will be a trilogy, he has plans for further books set within the same universe.

== Synopsis ==
The book follows several people tasked with the job of decommissioning a remote space station, the U-Star Coast City. The job is to be the final orders for black ops Captain Abraham Idaho Cleveland (referred to as "Ida"), as he is going to retire shortly after the task is completed. He's haunted by the memories of a battle against a Mother Spider, an alien creature capable of devouring entire worlds. Ida managed to successfully stop her from destroying a planet, but at the cost of lives and Ida's knee.

His arrival in Coast City sparks the ire of the crew members Carter and DeJohn, who are unwilling to believe that Ida was capable of the feat – especially since there was no news reporting about the event. His only true friend is the medic Izanami, with whom Ida frequently confides. Knowing that his presence aboard the ship is for appearances only, Ida spends his time constructing a space radio, through which he listens in to various conversations between other space crews. He is startled when he overhears an ancient communication from a Russian woman in some distress, as the woman talks about how she is burning and in danger from ship failure.

At the same time several strange occurrences are happening on board the Coast City and the psi-marine Serra has been frequently hearing the voice of her dead grandmother calling to her. This is compounded by the multiple electronic malfunctions on the station and the fact that the Coast City is effectively cut off from the rest of mankind because of this. Things come to a breaking point when Zia Hollywood, a space profiteer and celebrity, boards the ship to refuel and rest before she and her crew move on. As tensions rise and more strange and frightening phenomena increase in frequency, the crew must discover who or what is causing all of the trouble and what it all means.

== Reception ==
Critical reception for The Burning Dark has been mostly positive, and the novel received praise from The Roanoke Times, SciFiNow, and Starburst Magazine. SFX wrote that the book was "studded with memorable imagery" and that "although it’s clear to the reader from early on that certain things are not what they seem, Christopher keeps you guessing concerning how the major plot elements link up." In contrast, RT Book Reviews and Publishers Weekly both criticized the work, and RT Book Reviews commented that "The big reveal of character backstory and motivation for the “big evil” is short, inadequate and a bit trite."
