= Overcast Off =

American indie rock band

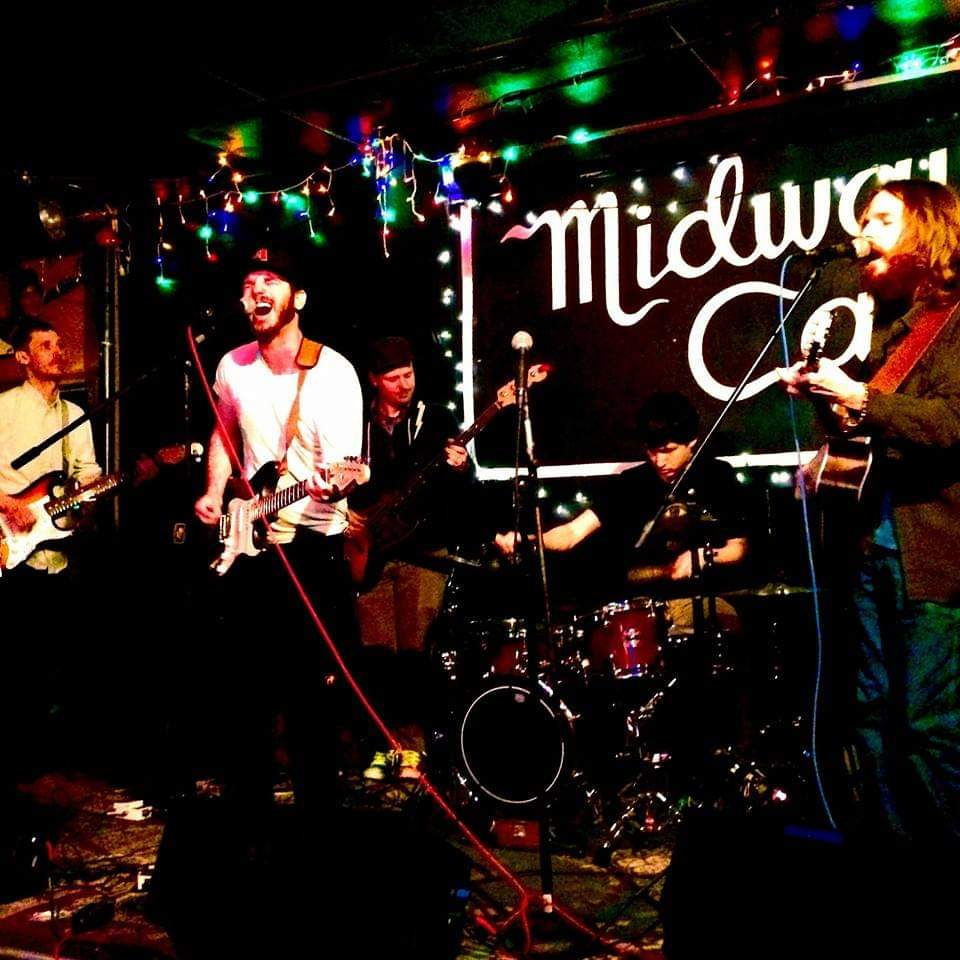
- Overcast Off in concert, 2015.

Background information
- Origin: Tucson, Arizona, United States
- Genres: Indie rock, Folk rock, Lo-Fi
- Years active: 2009—present

Overcast Off is an American indie rock band formed in Tucson, Arizona and currently located in Boston, Massachusetts. After a successful west coast tour in 2009, the band started to gain a fair amount of underground buzz. Overcast Off has described their sound as "electric folk music that doesn't sound like folk music." In early 2010, they participated in the Camp Wildcat benefit concert at Club Congress.

The band's genre is generally considered indie rock, lo-fi, or folk.

== Discography ==
=== Studio albums ===
- Rags of Youth (2010)
- Utopia's Expatriate (2011)
- You Didn't Know Me (2015)
- Rabid Underdogs (2019)
