= Friedrich Neznansky =

Russian writer (1932–2013)

Friedrich Neznansky (Russian: Фридрих Евсеевич Незнанский; 27 September 1932 – 14 February 2013) was a popular Russian crime novelist.

Neznansky was born in Rahachow District, Belarus. He was a lawyer by education, practiced law in Moscow, and was an investigator at the Moscow Prosecutor General's office for fifteen years. Although Neznansky's crime novels are light fiction, the political and social currents of the day can be sensed in them, as well as everyday Russian realities. Neznansky's novels have been translated in several languages and some of them have been adapted for television. Neznansky died on 14 February 2013, aged 80, in Garmisch-Partenkirchen, Germany.

== English Translations ==
- Red Square (with Edward Topol), Berkley, 1984.
- Deadly Games (with Edward Topol), Berkley, 1985.
- The Body in Sokolniki Park, Bantam, 1987.
- Fair at Sokolniki, Corgi Books, 1987.
- Operation Faust, Corgi Books, 1988.
- Night Wolves, Infinity Publishing, 2004.
