= Frankenstein in Baghdad =

2013 novel by Ahmed Saadawi

- First edition (publ. al Kamel)
- Author: Ahmed Saadawi
- Language: Arabic
- Genre: War, horror, supernatural fiction
- Set in: Baghdad, Iraq
- Published: 2013
- Publisher: al-Kamel (Arabic), Penguin Books (English)
- Publication place: Iraq
- English publication date: 2018
- Award: 2014 IPAF award (International Prize for Arabic Fiction)

Frankenstein in Baghdad (Arabic: فرانكشتاين في بغداد) is a 2013 novel by Iraqi writer Ahmed Saadawi. The novel was translated into English by Jonathan Wright. The novel is a wartime spin on Mary Shelley's 1818 novel Frankenstein; or, The Modern Prometheus. The novel has won several awards – it won the IPAF award (International Prize for Arabic Fiction) for 2014, making Saadawi the first Iraqi writer to win the prize, and the 2017 Grand Prix de l'Imaginaire.

== Background ==
The novel took Saadawi four years to write. Saadawi's personal experience informed the creation of the novel: during the civil war, he was working as a journalist in Baghdad; at a morgue, he witnessed how a young man wished to find the corpse of his brother who had been killed by a bomb, but was told to simply take any body parts he could find and make a body.

== Plot ==
In the aftermath of the U.S. invasion of Iraq, Hadi al-Attag, a junk-dealer from the neighborhood of Bataween, collects the scattered body parts of bomb victims with the intention of giving them a proper burial. Hadi first stitches the body parts together to create a single body, calling it "Whatsitsname". One bombing kills a bodyguard and pulverizes his body completely, and his soul enters Whatsitsname and brings it to life. Whatsitsname leaves Hadi's residence and is found by his next-door-neighbor, an elderly Assyrian Christian woman named Elishva, who believes Whatsitname to be her son, Daniel, who was drafted into the conflict with Iran twenty years prior and never returned. Her daughters in Australia, hearing the news of "Daniel"'s return, believe her insane and ask her to leave Iraq and come to live with them; Elishva grows furious and cuts off all contact with them.

Mahmud al-Sawadi is an ambitious young journalist from the city of Amarah. He is in self-imposed exile: in Amarah, he had written an article theorizing that there were three types of justice – legal justice, divine justice, and street justice – and that every criminal would at some point receive one of those justices. The brother of a gangster was killed soon after, and Mahmud was accused of inciting the murder, forcing him to escape to Baghdad, where he works under a charismatic but shady editor, al-Saïdi, whom he aspires to emulate.

Soon, stories spread of unexplained murders and an invincible criminal. Hadi realizes that the murders are likely the work of Whatsitsname. Later he is visited by Whatsitsname, who tells him he is on a mission to avenge those responsible for the deaths of those whose body parts compose his own body. Once he has successfully avenged a victim, their body part will decompose, however, it will also decompose if he fails to avenge them within a certain time. Hadi convinces him to record his story and, in exchange for Mahmud's secret about his origins, he gives him the recording.

Mahmud publishes Whatsitsname's story; the story reaches the Brigadier General Majid, a friend of al-Saïdi, who suspects the story to be connected to the murders. He questions Mahmud, who tells him that he received the story from Hadi, and gives him Hadi's address. Majid then sends his men to Hadi's residence, where they interrogate him about Whatsitsname. Hadi insists that Whatsitsname is not real, nevertheless, he is beaten, left for dead, and robbed. His neighbors find him and nurse him back to health. Meanwhile, Whatsitsname is running out of body parts, and begins to kill innocent civilians to harvest their organs and thus maintain his body. He begins to doubt his mission, wondering if in fact "there are no innocents who are only innocent, and no criminals who are only criminals".

Aziz the Egyptian, Hadi's only friend, tells Mahmud that Hadi began to collect body parts after the death of his friend and business partner, Nahem Abdaki, in a bombing. When Hadi had gone to collect Nahem's body from the morgue, he was told that there were body parts from multiple people who died in the bombing, but no way to tell which body parts belonged to whom, and to simply take any body parts he believed belonged to Nahem. Hadi then decided to collect body parts to give their owners an honorable burial. Aziz convinces Mahmud that Whatsitsname was not real, and Mahmud does not interview Hadi afterwards.

Elishva is convinced to move to Australia by her grandson Daniel, who looks and seems so similar to her son that the old woman is tricked into believing that her son came back from the war. Whatsitsname comes to her home to see her, but finds the home empty. Al-Saïdi is accused of embezzling 13 million dollars, but leaves the country before he can be arrested, leaving Mahmud to be arrested and interrogated and the magazine to be liquidated. Mahmud sells all his possessions to pay the salaries of the magazine employees.

Majid is tipped off by one of his men to Whatsitsname's location in Bataween. When he arrives, a bomb, set by another one of his men to kill Whatsitsname, explodes in the neighborhood, injuring Hadi severely and destroying his home. The bomb, however, fails to kill Whatsitsname. Hadi wakes up in a hospital and discovers that his face has been so badly disfigured that he is now indistinguishable from Whatsitsname. He is then arrested for the crimes of Whatsitsname; Mahmud knows that Hadi could not have been behind the murders, but cannot do anything about it. The fate of Whatsitsname remains unclear. Mahmud returns to Amara, disillusioned with his former ideals of justice; he now believes that there is no justice in Iraq, only anarchy.

== Analysis ==
Whatsitsname is a blank slate who represents different things depending on the individual. For the Sunnis, he is a Shiite extremist, for the Shia, he is a Wahhabi; the Iraqi government describes him as an agent of foreign powers, while the Americans claim that he works against them. For one of his followers, he represents the "first Iraqi citizen", because his body is composed of individuals from diverse ethnic groups, religions, social classes, and races. Whatsitsname sees himself, however, as the deliverer of justice; ultimately, he will find out that "anyone who unilaterally attempts to impose justice... will ultimately fail".

== Translations ==
Language	Title	Translator	Year of Publication	Publisher	ISBN
Bosnian	Frankenštajn u Bagdadu	Nedim Ćatović	2020	Buybook	ISBN 9789958304835
Bulgarian	Франкенщайн от Багдад	Emil Tsenkov (Емил Ценков)	2019	Kivi	ISBN 9786197300628
Catalan	Frankenstein a Bagdad	Alexandre Queraltó Bartrés	2019	Ara Llibres	ISBN 9788417918057
Chinese	巴格達 x 怪客	Shaoqi Huang (黃紹綺)	2018	Yuan shen chu ban she you xian gong si	ISBN 9789869452472
Czech	Frankenstein z Bagdádu	Jitka Jeníková	2022	Akropolis	ISBN 9788074704604
Dutch	Frankenstein in Bagdad	Djûke Poppinga	2019	De Geus	ISBN 9789044541328
French	Frankenstein à Bagdad	France Meyer	2016	Piranha	ISBN 9782371190474
German	Frankenstein in Bagdad	Hartmut Fähndrich	2019	Assoziation A	ISBN 9783862414727
Hebrew	פרנקנשטיין בבגדאד	Bruriah Horwitz (ברוריה הורביץ)	2017	Kinneret Zmora-Bitan Dvir	ISBN 9789655664775
Hungarian	Frankenstein Bagdadban	Gellért Marcell	2019	Athenaeum	ISBN 9789632938288
Italian	Frankenstein a Baghdad	Barbara Teresi	2015	Edizioni E/O	ISBN 9788866326830
Japanese	バグダードのフランケンシュタイン	Ayumi Yanagiya (柳谷あゆみ)	2020	Shueisha	ISBN 9784087735048
Korean	바그다드의 프랑켄슈타인	Yŏng-hak Cho (조 영학)	2018	Deobom	ISBN 9791188522118
Lithuanian	Frankenšteinas Bagdade	Matas Geležauskas	2018	Liūtai ne avys	ISBN 9786099603315
Norwegian (Bokmal)	Frankenstein i Bagdad		2019	Solum Bokvennen	ISBN 9788256020928
Persian	فرانكشتاين در بغداد	Imil Nabhānī (امل نبهانى)	2015	Nashr-i Nīmāzh	ISBN 9786003670563
Polish	Frankenstein w Bagdadzie	Magdalena Zawrotna	2019	Znak	ISBN 9788324048830
Portuguese	Frankenstein em Bagdade		2021	Gradiva	ISBN 9789896169404
Romanian	Frankenstein în Bagdad	Cătălina Stanislav	2018	Paralela 45	ISBN 9789734728589
Russian	Франкенштейн в Багдаде	Viktoriya Nikolayevna Zarytovskaya (Зарытовская Виктория Николаевна)	2019	Eksmo	ISBN 9785041036652
Slovak	Frankenstein v Bagdade	Samo Marec	2020	Premedia	ISBN 9788081598074
Spanish	Frankenstein en Bagdad	Ana Gil Bardají	2019	Libros del Asteroide	ISBN 9788417007935
Swedish	Frankenstein i Bagdad	Jonathan Morén	2019	Tranan	ISBN 9789188253750
Turkish	Frankenstein Bağdat'ta	Süleyman Şahin	2018	Timaş Yayınları	ISBN 9786050829242

== Reception ==
The book received almost entirely positive reviews from Western press. The New York Times stated that the novel "blends the unearthly, the horrific and the mundane to terrific effect". A review in Haaretz called Saadawi's writing style clever, combining "compassionate moments of grace and sympathy" with "macabre humor that adds a cynical view of the goings-on". British reviewer Sarah Perry suggested that the novel evokes Kafka as well as Shelley, its story emphasizing the pointlessness and surrealism of war. It has been characterized as "one of the most important novels of post-2003 Iraqi literature", and "one of the best novels to emerge from the catastrophe of the Iraq War".

=== Honors and awards ===
- Winner of the International Prize for Arabic Fiction, 2014
- Winner of the Grand Prix de l'Imaginaire (Foreign Novel), 2017
- Shortlisted for the International Booker Prize, 2018
- Shortlisted for the Arthur C. Clarke Award, 2019
