= The Wallpapered Manse =

Book by Peter Freeman

- Author: Peter Freeman
- Illustrator: Peter Freeman, Andrew Metcalf (photographs)
- Language: English
- Subject: Historic building, conservation and restoration
- Published: 2013 (The Watermark Press)
- Publication place: Australia
- Media type: Print (paperback)
- Pages: 151 pp.
- ISBN: 9780992315603
- OCLC: 855783565

The Wallpapered Manse: The Rescue of an Endangered House is a book by Australian architect Peter Freeman. Published in 2013, it is about the restoration of a Georgian styled 1860s Presbyterian manse located in Moruya.

== Reception ==
The Wallpapered Manse has been called "an outstanding example of the skills of a leading conservation architect" and "a fascinating story of renovation and the recovery of more than just a house."

It was shortlisted in the 2014 New South Wales Premier's History Awards for the New South Wales Community and Regional History prize and highly commended in the 2013 NSW National Trust Heritage Awards for Education Interpretation and Community Engagement.
