= William Bridges (author) =

American writer

William Bridges (1933 – February 17, 2013) was an American author, speaker, and organizational consultant. He emphasized the importance of understanding transitions as a key for organizations to succeed in making changes. He says transition is the psychological process of adapting to change. Transition consists of three phases: letting go of the past, the "neutral zone" where the past is gone but the new isn't fully present, and making the new beginning.

He was educated at Harvard (BA, English), Columbia (MA, American History) and Brown (PhD, American Civilization) Universities and taught American Literature at Mills College until 1974, when he became a consultant.

Bridges died on February 17, 2013, from complications of Lewy body disease at his home in Larkspur. He was 79.

== Books ==
- Managing Transitions ISBN 0-7382-1380-2
- Transitions ISBN 0-7382-0904-X
- The Way of Transition ISBN 0-7382-0529-X
- Creating You & Co ISBN 0-7382-0032-8
- Jobshift: How to Prosper in a Workplace Without Jobs ISBN 978-0201489330

== External sources ==
- William Bridges' Amazon Page
- wmbridges.com
