= The Neanderthals Rediscovered =

2013 non-fiction book

- Authors: Dimitra Papagianni; Michael A. Morse
- Publisher: Thames & Hudson
- Publication date: 2013
- Pages: 208
- Awards: 2015 Society for American Archaeology Popular Book Award
- ISBN: 978-0-500-05177-1
- Dewey Decimal: 569.986

The Neanderthals Rediscovered: How Modern Science is Rewriting Their Story is a 2013 non-fiction book by Dimitra Papagianni and Michael A. Morse, published by Thames & Hudson. The book focuses on the history, culture, and extinction of Neanderthals, the closest known relatives of anatomically modern humans. Neanderthals are widely stereotyped as primitive or unintelligent compared to modern humans, a myth dispelled by research in the twentieth and twenty-first centuries. Written to summarize substantial advances in Neanderthal research in the previous few decades, The Neanderthals Rediscovered addresses subjects like how Neanderthals used tools, how they hunted, the societies they formed, and potential reasons for their extinction. The book is fully illustrated, including 16 all-illustration pages.

Upon release, The Neanderthals Rediscovered received positive reviews. Critics praised its accessibility, its focus, and the quality of its illustrations. The Neanderthals Rediscovered won the Society for American Archaeology's 2015 Popular Book Award, with the organization describing it as "strik[ing] an excellent balance between broad popular appeal and satisfyingly rich content".

== Context and background ==
Neanderthals were extinct hominins who lived until about 40,000 years ago. They are the closest known relatives of anatomically modern humans. Neanderthal skeletons were first discovered in the early 19th century; research on Neanderthals in the 19th and early 20th centuries argued for a perspective of them as "primitive" beings socially and cognitively inferior to modern humans. This concept of the "brutish Neanderthal" was revealed to be a misconception in the late twentieth century, as research found Neanderthals had markedly greater cognitive and cultural sophistication than previously thought. Nonetheless, negative stereotypes of Neanderthals remain widespread amongst the general population.

The Neanderthals Rediscovered was co-written by the husband and wife team Dimitra Papagianni and Michael A. Morse. Papagianni is an archaeologist specializing in Paleolithic stone tools, while Morse is a historian of science. Both authors had published books previously. Papagianni was an editor of the 2008 archaeological compilation Time and Change: Archaeological and Anthropological Perspectives on the Long-Term in Hunter-Gatherer Societies. Morse was the author of How the Celts Came to Britain, published in 2005 by Tempus Publishing, which was selected as one of The Times Literary Supplement's Books of the Year.

== Synopsis ==
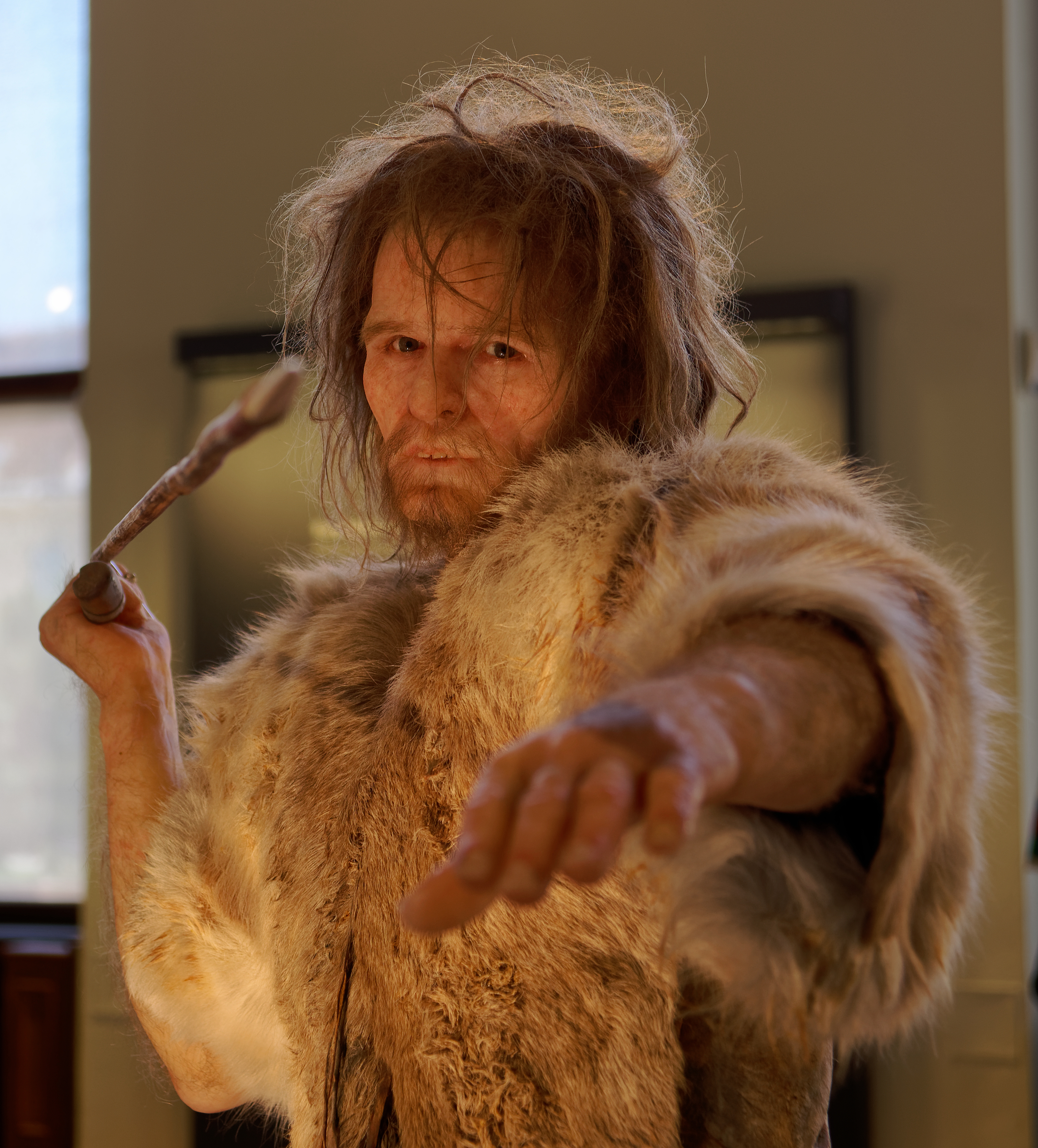
Reconstructed Neanderthal man

The Neanderthals Rediscovered covers the scientific understanding of Neanderthals and how it advanced over the years until the book's publication. The period over which the book was written was one of substantial advances in scientific understanding of Neanderthals, their culture, their interactions with anatomically modern humans, and the circumstances under which they went extinct; its preface discusses this, noting that if the book had been finished by its original deadline of 2008, it would have become obsolete before publication. The book is illustrated with a total of 77 images, including 16 all-image pages; image subjects include maps of areas Neanderthals inhabited, reconstructions, and prehistoric tools.

The first chapter chronologies the nineteenth-century discovery of Neanderthal fossils and the varying conceptualizations of them over time, including how it had changed over the authors' careers. Papagianni and Morse, who met as graduate students at the University of Cambridge in the early 1990s, give the example that at the time it was not yet clear if Neanderthals and anatomically modern humans lived in Europe at the same time; later research showed they coexisted for thousands of years. They mark the 1993 publication of In Search of the Neanderthals by Chris Stringer and Clive Gamble as a turning point in Neanderthal research for clarifying that Neanderthals were replaced by Homo sapiens sapiens, rather than the latter having evolved directly from them.

The Neanderthals Rediscovered's coverage of the eponymous people traces topics such as their diet (including theories of cannibalism), their housing, their tool use, the organization of their societies, and their speech and symbolic thought. Owing to Papagianni's background as a researcher of Paleolithic stone tools, the book extensively discusses the complexity of Neanderthal tools and its implications; a subsection of a chapter is dedicated to explaining the use and production of stone tools. Papagianni and Morse argue for the social brain hypothesis, positing that the hunting patterns implied by Neanderthal tool use require both advanced cognition and a complex society. They describe complex Neanderthal hunts, such as large group hunts that ran woolly mammoths off cliffs, and present these as requiring substantial and sophisticated coordination between many individuals.

As the book moves from the period in which Neanderthals inhabited Europe alone to the time they coexisted with H. s. sapiens, it discusses the history of scholarship of that coexistence. In a discussion of Neanderthal burial, Papagianni and Morse focus on the nearby sites of Tabun Cave and Skhul Cave in northern Israel. Skhul was a H. s. sapiens burial site, while Tabun was a Neanderthal one. Early researchers assumed the Neanderthal site was dated earlier based on the knowledge that Neanderthals pre-dated H. s. sapiens within Europe; more advanced techniques found they were both far closer together and far earlier than once thought. The authors draw attention to the fact this early H. s. sapiens attempt to migrate from Africa to Eurasia "ended in failure", with Neanderthals being the primary occupants of Eurasia for tens of thousands of years while anatomically modern humans failed to take root in the area.

The book addresses the question of why and how Neanderthals went extinct. It discusses common hypotheses, such as Neanderthals having a more limited capacity for symbolic and creative thought than H. s. sapiens. The evidence for art or decorative work amongst Neanderthals is limited, while Paleolithic H. s. sapiens is known to have produced extensive creative work, such as cave paintings, figurines, and simple music instruments like flutes. The authors compare the remnants of Neanderthal culture during this period of coexistence to that of anatomically modern humans 100,000 years prior, who, like Neanderthals, buried their dead and used red ochre as a dye, but lacked the complex art of their progeny.

Natural climate change is one of the major factors to which The Neanderthals Rediscovered ascribes the Neanderthals' extinction. The authors note that Neanderthal population decline was contemporaneous with that of Stephanorhinus kirchbergensis and the straight-tusked elephant, which they consider to have been some of its major prey. They discuss the hypothesis that expansion of steppe areas benefitted humans from tree-sparse regions, with negative consequences for both Neanderthals and for other cultures of anatomically modern humans.

The Neanderthals Rediscovered ends by discussing the role Neanderthals play in modern culture. The book addresses the prevalence of popular misconceptions about Neanderthals, including the idea they had stooped postures, were unintelligent, or were especially aggressive. It criticises both this practice and its backlash of portraying Neanderthals as noble savages, "a gentle, gifted, morally superior people with extraordinary tracking abilities, all reminiscent of Native Americans in 19th-century literature". The authors end on the statement that by contrasting the known intelligence and complexity of Neanderthals with their simplistic cultural portrayals, "we can start to remember them for what they were and what they accomplished, rather than seeing them only through the lens of our own insecurities".

== Publication ==
The genesis of The Neanderthals Rediscovered was Papagianni's experience teaching a university course on prehistory from a Neanderthal perspective, which she found was exceptionally popular amongst students. Many of her students queried her for book recommendations on the subject, and she felt there was a lack of recent works on Neanderthals to recommend them. The book was written over a several-year period, during which the couple moved from Oxfordshire to Armonk, New York. Their book proposal was accepted by the publisher in 2007, which they learned on the same day they took their newborn twin sons home from hospital. Papagianni and Morse collaborated on the project through their different writing styles; Papagianni would write early drafts in a "traditional, academic style", after which Morse expanded them in a more literary fashion.

The Neanderthals Rediscovered was published in 2013 by Thames & Hudson, a family-run publisher of illustrated books. It is 208 pages long with 77 illustrations. A second edition was released in 2015, and an expanded third edition in 2022.

== Reception ==
The Neanderthals Rediscovered received generally positive reviews. Critics praised its accessibility, its focus, and the quality of its illustrations. The work won the Society for American Archaeology's 2015 Popular Book Award, with the organization describing it as "strik[ing] an excellent balance between broad popular appeal and satisfyingly rich content".

Reviewers drew attention to the book's handling of Neanderthal stereotypes. Robert S. Davis, a professor of history at Wallace State Community College, remarked upon its attempt to dispel views of Neanderthals as "crude and stupid" and on how it juxtaposed the history of Neanderthals themselves with the history of scholarship on them. The paleontologist Stephen Donovan, in a review for Geological Journal, drew attention to the final chapter's focus on Neanderthals in popular culture; he remarked that, prior to reading, he had underestimated just how widely portrayed they were. Dan Clendenin, an author and scholar of religious studies, contextualized The Neanderthals Rediscovered within an evolution of opinion on Neanderthals from "cavemen" to complex humans.

The Neanderthals Rediscovered's prose and illustrations were critically acclaimed. Donovan called the book "a pleasure to read, as fascinating as a good novel" and praised its illustrations and design as "of the highest quality in all the important ways". Clendenin stated he "enjoyed" the illustrations, while Davis praised the book's lack of "technical jargon" and how its authors "share their extensive knowledge, raise questions, and debate answers in a most collegial way". David Quammen, reviewing The Neanderthals Rediscovered for Harper's Magazine alongside Neanderthal Man: In Search of Lost Genomes by Svante Pääbo and Lone Survivors: How We Came to Be the Only Humans on Earth by Chris Stringer, praised its "fresh charm" and described it as less "discursive" than the other works.

Quammen's review presents Papagianni and Morse as coming from the perspective of organismic biology, which understands biology primarily on the level of organisms and populations, as juxtaposed with molecular biology, which studies life from a molecular perspective. He contrasts this position with Pääbo, a molecular biologist. Quammen praised all three works for their in-depth research on Neanderthal history, a subject with exceptionally limited evidence compared to that offered by living species. He drew particular attention to The Neanderthals Rediscovered's presentation of human evolution as "a curious story that leads to the Neanderthals, rather than as a moral tale that rises ever upward and inevitably to us godlike moderns", and deemed its chapters focusing on the period from 250,000 to 60,000 years ago superior to its early chapters that focused on pre-Neanderthal prehistory.

In the years following its release, The Neanderthals Rediscovered has remained a significant popular work on Neanderthals. In 2023, the philosopher Nikhil Krishnan described it in The Guardian as a "fascinating survey of Neanderthal science". The novelist Lee Child praised The Neanderthals Rediscovered in a 2021 interview with The Times. The book has been reprinted twice following its original publication in 2013; reviewing in 2022, Clendenin felt it was slightly dated, but still a high-quality work. He recommended Kindred: Neanderthal Life, Love, Death and Art by Rebecca Wragg Sykes, published in 2020, for a more up-to-date perspective on Neanderthals.
