= Adam Christopher =

New Zealand novelist

- Born: Adam Christopher McGechan; 2 February 1978 (age 48); Auckland, New Zealand
- Occupation: Writer
- Writing career
- Period: 2008–present
- Genres: Science fiction Superhero fiction Urban fantasy Horror fiction Crime fiction
- Website: www.adamchristopher.me

Adam Christopher McGechan (born 2 February 1978 in Auckland, New Zealand), who writes under the name Adam Christopher, is a New York Times Bestselling novelist known for his genre fiction. Born in New Zealand, he moved to North West England in 2006, where he lives with his wife.

== Career ==
Christopher has released several books through Angry Robot and Tor Books. He has also worked as an editor for nine issues of Time/Space Visualiser, the journal of the New Zealand Doctor Who Fan Club, from 2003 to 2009. In 2010, he won a Sir Julius Vogel Award for Best Fan Publication for TSV.

== Bibliography ==
=== Standalone novels ===
- Seven Wonders (September 2012 – ISBN 978 0 85766 195 1 [UK] | ISBN 978 0 85766 196 8 [US], Angry Robot)
- Hang Wire (2014, Angry Robot)
- Crawlspace (2026, Tor Books)

=== Series ===
==== Empire State ====
- Empire State (January 2012 – ISBN 978 0 85766 192 0 [UK] | ISBN 978 0 85766 193 7 [US], Angry Robot)
- The Age Atomic (2013, Angry Robot)

==== Ray Electromatic Mysteries ====
"Brisk Money" is a novelette published by Tor.com in 2014 set in the same universe of the Ray Electromatic Mysteries.

- Made to Kill (2015, Tor Books)
- Standard Hollywood Depravity (2017, Tor Books)
- Killing Is My Business (2017, Tor Books)
- I Only Killed Him Once (2018, Tor Books)

==== Spider Wars ====
- The Burning Dark (2014, originally titled Shadow's Call, Tor Books)
- The Machine Awakes (2015, originally titled The Jovian Conspiracy, Tor Books)
- The Dead Stars (2023, Tor Books)

"Cold War" is a novelette published by Tor.com in 2014 set in the same universe of the Spider Wars series.

=== Tie-in fiction ===
==== Dishonored ====
- Dishonored: The Corroded Man (September 27, 2016, Titan Books)
- Dishonored: The Return of Daud (March 27, 2018, Titan Books)
- Dishonored: The Veiled Terror (2018, Titan Books)

==== Elementary ====
- Elementary: The Ghost Line (2015, Titan Books)
- Elementary: Blood and Ink (2016, Titan Books)

==== Stranger Things ====
- Stranger Things: Darkness on the Edge of Town (2019, Del Rey)

==== Star Wars ====
- "End of Watch" in Star Wars: From A Certain Point of View (2017, Del Rey)
- "The Witness" in Star Wars: From A Certain Point of View: The Empire Strikes Back (2020, Del Rey)
- Shadow of the Sith (2022, Del Rey)
- Master of Evil (2025, Random House)

=== Comics ===
==== Dark Circle Comics/Archie Comics ====
- The Shield vol. 5 #1-4 (with Chuck Wendig and Drew Johnson, October 2015-November 2016)

==== Star Wars Adventures ====
- Alone in the Dark in Star Wars Adventures #26 (with Megan Levens, September 25, 2019)

==== Lazarus ====
- Ganymede in Lazarus: Rising #2 (prose short story, illustrated by Michael Lark, July 24, 2019)
