= The Great Swindle (novel) =

2013 novel by Pierre Lemaitre

- First edition
- Author: Pierre Lemaitre
- Language: French
- Series: Interwar period's trilogy
- Release number: 1st in series
- Publication place: France
- Followed by: Couleurs de l'incendie

The Great Swindle (original title: Au revoir là-haut) is a 2013 novel by Pierre Lemaitre set in France in the aftermath of the First World War. It was published in French in 2013 by Albin Michel under its original title, and subsequently released in an English translation by Frank Wynne in 2015 by MacLehose Press.

It won several notable awards, such as the Prix Goncourt, and was adapted into a film, See You Up There, in 2017. It is the first of three novels by Lemaitre spanning the interwar period. The second novel in the series, Couleurs de l'incendie, was published in January 2018. The third and final novel in the series, Miroir de nos peines, was published in January 2020.

== Synopsis ==
In the final days of the First World War, Lieutenant Henri d'Aulnay Pradelle purposely kills two of his subordinates to incite the rest of the troops under his command. Two witnesses, Albert Maillard and Édouard Péricourt, survive the assault on the Germans, though Péricourt is severely injured. Pradelle, Maillard and Péricourt struggle to adjust to civilian life after the war ends. Péricourt and Maillard decide to take revenge on a society that appears to have more sympathy for its war dead than its war wounded by mounting a scheme to sell monuments to invented war heroes. Meanwhile, Pradelle has devised his own fraudulent scheme, and is involved with Péricourt's sister, Madeleine.

== Adaptations ==
- Au revoir là-haut (2015), comic book by Christian De Metter
- See You Up There (2017), film directed by Albert Dupontel
