= And Every Day Was Overcast =

Novel by Paul Kwiatkowski

- Paperback cover
- Author: Paul Kwiatkowski
- Language: English
- Genre: Literary fiction Photography
- Publisher: Black Balloon Publishing
- Publication date: October 15, 2013
- Publication place: United States
- Media type: Print (Hardcover) (Paperback); Digital (iBooks) (EPUB)
- Pages: 280
- ISBN: 978-1-936-78707-4

And Every Day Was Overcast is a photo-illustrated novel by American author Paul Kwiatkowski, published on October 15, 2013, by Black Balloon Publishing.

It has been praised by Ira Glass as "a mix of this clean, spare, unaffected prose about growing up near the swamps of South Florida — plus these incredible photos .... A completely original and clearheaded voice." Alec Soth also referred to the book as "a landmark in visual storytelling."

== Description ==
Set throughout the 1990s, And Every Day Was Overcast revolves around an unnamed male narrator coming of age in Southern Florida. In an effort to overcome his own asocial character and the anti-social behavior of those around him, the teenage narrator relies on television, alcohol and drugs to escape reality. The narrative text is complemented by over 100 photographs from Kwiatkowski's own childhood in Loxahatchee, Florida during the 1990s. Though the photographs do not directly illustrate the text, they depict a similar environment.

== Publication ==
And Every Day Was Overcast was simultaneously released in hardcover, paperback, e-book and iBooks formats. The hardcover edition was available in a limited quantity with a photographic print signed by Kwiatkowski and a vinyl record soundtrack produced by the author and Black Balloon Publishing. The soundtrack is also digitally included on the iBooks version, along with interviews Kwiatkowski conducted with women from Southern Florida about their experiences growing up there.
