= Alexei Rudeanu =

Romanian author (1939–2013)

Alexsei Rudeanu
- Born: April 12, 1939; Chișinău, Kingdom of Romania (today in Moldova)
- Died: January 2, 2013 (aged 73); Bucharest, Romania
- Occupation: Novelist
- Writing career
- Language: Romanian
- Years active: 1969–2007

Alexei Rudeanu (April 12, 1939 – January 2, 2013) was a Romanian author.

== Works ==
- Exilul Pisicilor (1969)
- Ultimul Monac (1973)
- Focul rece (1973)
- Destine din nord (1974)
- Pietrele acestel case (1975)
- Mansarda colibei (1976)
- Fratele norocos (1980)
- Rusinea familiea (1983)
- Maraton spre fericire (2007) ISBN 9789738769588 (as Aleksander Mertz)
