= 2013 in the United Kingdom =

Events from the year 2013 in the United Kingdom.

== Incumbents ==
- Monarch – Elizabeth II
- Prime Minister – David Cameron (Coalition)

== Events ==
=== January ===
- 1 January – the United Kingdom assumes presidency of the G8 group. The next G8 summit is to be held on the shores of Lough Erne, County Fermanagh in June.
- 4 January – Mark Cahill, a 51-year-old former pub landlord from West Yorkshire becomes the first person in the UK to receive a hand transplant.
- 10 January – April Casburn, a senior detective with the Metropolitan Police is found guilty of trying to sell information on the investigation into phone hacking to the News of the World, the newspaper at the centre of the scandal. On 1 February she is jailed for fifteen months.
- 11 January – publication of the Giving Victims a Voice report, initiated as a result of publicity surrounding the Jimmy Savile sexual abuse scandal.
- 13 January – 86 year old Una Crown is found murdered at her home in Wisbech, Cambridgeshire.
- 16 January – a helicopter crash in central London kills two people and injures 13 others.
- 19 January – an avalanche at Glencoe in Argyll and Bute, Scotland, kills four people.
- 22 January – a death sentence handed to British citizen Lindsay Sandiford by an Indonesian court for drug smuggling is condemned by the UK government.
- 28 January – Government plans to redraw Parliamentary constituency boundaries before the next general election are defeated in the House of Commons by 334 to 292.
- 30 January – Tony McCluskie is found guilty of the March 2012 murder of his sister, actress Gemma McCluskie, and jailed for life with a recommendation he serve a minimum term of 20 years.

=== February ===
- 4 February – former government Minister Chris Huhne pleads guilty to perverting the course of justice over claims he caused his ex-wife to accept speeding points he had incurred. He also announces his intention to resign his House of Commons seat.
- 5 February – the House of Commons votes 400 to 175 in favour of a vote on the bill to legalise same-sex marriage in England and Wales.
- 7 February – Secretary of State for Education Michael Gove confirms that plans to replace the General Certificate of Secondary Education with a new English Baccalaureate qualification have been abandoned.
- 23 February – the UK loses its top AAA credit rating for the first time since 1978 after being downgraded by the ratings agency Moody's.
- 25 February – Cardinal Keith O'Brien, Britain's most senior Roman Catholic cleric, resigns as the Archbishop of St Andrews and Edinburgh due to allegations of inappropriate sexual behaviour towards priests in the 1980s.
- 27 February – Archbishop of Glasgow Philip Tartaglia is appointed apostolic administrator of the Roman Catholic Archdiocese of St Andrews and Edinburgh following the resignation of Cardinal Keith O'Brien.
- 28 February – the Eastleigh by-election, triggered by the resignation of Chris Huhne, sees the Liberal Democrats hold the seat despite a UKIP surge that pushes the Conservatives into third place.

=== March ===
- 4 March
  - Queen Elizabeth II is admitted to hospital for observation after experiencing symptoms of gastroenteritis. Buckingham Palace have described it as a "precaution". She is discharged the following day.
  - Psychiatric patient Nicola Edgington, who stabbed a woman to death six years after killing her mother is jailed for life with a minimum of 37 years.
- 7 March
  - Foreign Secretary William Hague announces the UK will send armoured vehicles and body armour to opposition forces in Syria to help save lives.
  - The Office of Fair Trading gives the leading 50 companies providing payday loans in the United Kingdom 12 weeks to change their practices after identifying "widespread irresponsible lending".
  - Mid Ulster by-election results in Sinn Féin retaining the seat vacated by Martin McGuinness.
  - Vicky Pryce, ex-wife of former Cabinet Minister Chris Huhne, is convicted of perverting the course of justice after accepting speeding penalty points on Huhne's behalf.
  - Closure of Daw Mill colliery following a major fire, the last mine in the Warwickshire coalfield.
- 11 March – Chris Huhne and Vicky Pryce are each jailed for eight months for perverting the course of justice.
- 14 March
  - Prime Minister David Cameron says talks between himself and the leaders of the UK's other main political parties on the recommendations of the Leveson report have broken down and that he intends to publish a Royal Charter on press regulation.
  - Labour Party peer Lord Ahmed is suspended from the party after claiming a conspiracy by Jewish-owned media organisations was responsible for his imprisonment for dangerous driving.
- 16 March
  - Lance Corporal James Ashworth, who died in southern Afghanistan in 2012 while protecting his colleagues from a grenade blast, is to be awarded the Victoria Cross.
  - 62 people are arrested by Warwickshire Police following civil unrest in Nuneaton town centre ahead of a football match between Nuneaton Town and Lincoln City.
- 18 March – the final BBC news bulletins are transmitted from Television Centre, after 43 years of occupying the building, as the corporation moves its entire news operation to Broadcasting House in central London.
- 21 March
  - The date for the Scottish independence referendum is announced as 18 September 2014.
  - A man is killed when his vehicle is hit by a First Great Western express train on Athelney Level Crossing on the Reading–Taunton line in Somerset.
- 23 March – a blizzard which brings the heaviest March snow for 50+ years hits the north of England.
- 26 March
  - Former Foreign Secretary David Miliband confirms he is to resign as an MP and move to the United States to become head of the International Rescue Committee in New York.
  - A teenage girl is found dead by police at a house in the Atherton area of Greater Manchester where four "out of control" dogs are subsequently put down. Police said her injuries are consistent with those of a dog attack. She is named the following day as 14-year-old Jade Anderson.

=== April ===
- 1 April – Police Scotland begins operations, merging all the former forces in the country.
- 3 April – 17-year-old Paris Brown is appointed as the first youth Police and crime commissioner by Kent PCC Ann Barnes. Her job is to represent young people's views on policing in Kent.
- 8 April – former British Prime Minister Margaret Thatcher dies in London following a stroke. Street parties are held in a number of cities across the UK to "celebrate".

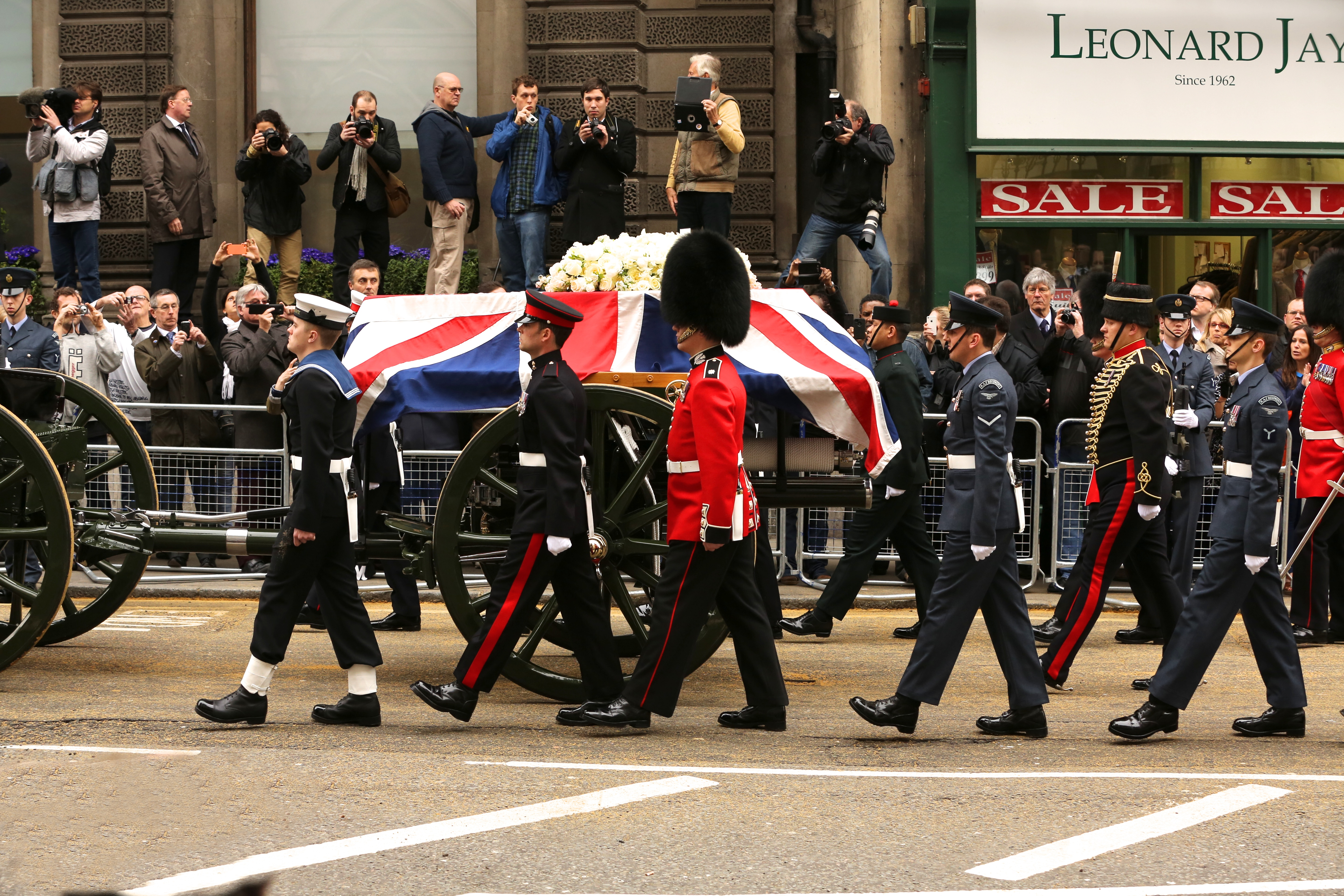
Thatcher's horse drawn hearse

- 9 April – six days after being appointed as Britain's first Youth Police and Crime Commissioner, Paris Brown steps down from the role after controversy over postings she made on Twitter.
- 10 April – "Ding-Dong! The Witch Is Dead" charts at number 10 in the Official Midweek Charts as opponents of former Prime Minister Margaret Thatcher have been buying copies of the song following her death two days earlier.
- 17 April – the funeral of Margaret Thatcher takes place at London's St Paul's Cathedral.
- 19 April – the Royal Agricultural College at Cirencester is granted full university status as the Royal Agricultural University.
- 22 April
  - A London house goes on sale for a record £250 million, 700 times greater than the average £370,000 cost of a property in the city.
  - Manchester United F.C. are crowned champions of England for the 20th time. It is their 13th Premier League title.
- 23 April – businessman James McCormick is convicted at the Old Bailey on three counts of fraud after selling fake bomb detectors, based on a device for finding golf balls, to countries including Iraq and Georgia. On 2 May he is jailed for ten years.
- 25 April – passing of the following Acts of Parliament:
  - Defamation Act 2013.
  - Succession to the Crown Act 2013 alters the laws of succession to the British throne in accordance with the 2011 Perth Agreement to replace male-preference primogeniture with absolute primogeniture for those in the line of succession. This comes into effect in the UK and Commonwealth realms in 2015.

=== May ===
- 2 May
  - 2013 local elections show gains for the Labour Party and UKIP and losses for the Liberal Democrats and the Conservative Party.
  - Labour's Emma Buck retains the South Shields Parliamentary seat for the party following the by-election triggered by the resignation of David Miliband. However, Labour's majority is reduced significantly after the UK Independence Party secures almost a quarter of the votes cast.
- 8 May – Sir Alex Ferguson, the most successful manager in English football during his 27 years as manager of Manchester United, announces his retirement after the end of the Premier League season later in the month.
- 9 May – David Moyes, who has managed Everton for 11 years during which they have qualified for European competitions on five occasions, is announced as the successor to Sir Alex Ferguson.
- 11 May – Wigan Athletic win the FA Cup with a 1–0 win over Manchester City. Ben Watson scores the winning goal, a header from Shaun Maloney's corner, in the 90th minute of the game.
- 13 May – Stuart Hazell, 38, admits the murder of Tia Sharp, 12-year-old granddaughter of his partner Christine Sharp, who was found dead in New Addington, London, nine months ago. His murder trial at the Old Bailey began six days ago but he has previously denied the charge against him. The following day, he is sentenced to life imprisonment with a recommended minimum term of 38 years.
- 14 May
  - The Conservative Party publishes a draft European Union (Referendum) Bill aimed at holding a referendum on Britain's membership of the European Union by 2017. Prime Minister David Cameron had previously said a referendum would be held if he could renegotiate the terms of Britain's EU membership, but Tory MPs have been unhappy that legislation for a referendum was not included in the recent Queen's Speech.
  - Three days after winning the FA Cup, Wigan Athletic are relegated from the Premier League after a 4–1 defeat to Arsenal, making history as the first team to win the FA Cup and get relegated in the same season.
- 15 May
  - In the House of Commons, an amendment to the Queen's Speech expressing regret that it did not contain legislation for a referendum on Britain's EU membership is defeated 277–131.
  - MPs debate government proposals to tighten the law governing dangerous dogs following the death of Jade Anderson in March. The legislation would give police greater powers to deal with attacks on private property.
- 16 May – UKIP leader Nigel Farage is heckled by angry protesters during a campaign visit to Edinburgh.
- 21 May – MPs vote 366–161 in favour of the Marriage (Same Sex Couples) Bill taking an important step towards allowing gay marriage in England and Wales.
- 22 May – murder of Lee Rigby in Woolwich: off-duty British soldier Fusilier Lee Rigby, a former drummer serving with 2nd Battalion the Royal Regiment of Fusiliers, is killed in the street. Two men carrying knives and a meat cleaver are subsequently apprehended by police. The government treats the killing as a terrorist incident. The victim's identity is confirmed the following day.
- 24 May – a 24-year-old zoo worker is seriously injured after being attacked by a Sumatran tiger at South Lakes Wild Animal Park in Cumbria. Sarah McClay subsequently dies in hospital as a result of her injuries. Police launch an investigation into the attack.
- 25 May – 48 people are rescued from a trip boat which begins taking on water after colliding with a rock off the coast of Pembrokeshire.
- 30 May – a court in Mold, Wales, finds Mark Bridger guilty of abducting and murdering five-year-old April Jones in October 2012. The trial judge recommends that 47-year-old Bridger should never be released from prison. Only bone fragments of April Jones are ever found.
- 31 May – Conservative MP Patrick Mercer resigns the Tory whip following allegations he broke the rules on lobbying. He will not contest his seat in the next general election.

=== June ===
- 2 June – two Labour Party peers are suspended by their party after allegations they offered to undertake Parliamentary work in exchange for payment. A third peer, from the Ulster Unionist Party resigns the whip following the allegations.
- 4 June – members of the House of Lords vote in favour of the Marriage (Same Sex Couples) Bill, paving the way for gay marriage in the United Kingdom.
- 5 June – Prince Philip is admitted to a London hospital for an exploratory operation.
- 10 June – Tory MP Tim Yeo temporarily steps aside as head of the Energy and Climate Change Select Committee amid allegations he offered to advise energy companies in exchange for payment.
- 13 June – at Manchester Crown Court, Dale Cregan is given a whole life tariff for the murders of four people, including two police officers.
- 20 June – four Conservative MPs Christopher Chope, Peter Bone, Philip Hollobone camp outside Parliament in a move to facilitate parliamentary debate on an 'Alternative Queen's Speech' – an attempt to show what a future Conservative government might deliver. 42 policies are listed including reintroduction of the death penalty and conscription, the privatisation of the BBC, banning the burka in public places, holding a referendum on same-sex marriage and preparing to leave the European Union.
- 28 June – Moors murderer Ian Brady loses a legal challenge to be transferred from a psychiatric hospital back to prison.

=== July ===
- 6 July – John Prescott resigns from the Privy council in protest at delays to changes in press regulations.
- 7 July
  - Abu Qatada, a Muslim cleric with alleged links to al-Qaeda is deported to Jordan from the UK to face charges of terrorism.
  - Andy Murray wins the Men's Singles at Wimbledon 2013 defeating Novak Djokovic of Serbia in straight sets. Murray becomes the first British man to win Wimbledon since Fred Perry in 1936.
- 9 July
  - Ed Miliband says he will end the automatic "affiliation" fee paid by three million union members to the Labour Party after Unite the Union was accused of secretly signing up its members to get its favoured candidate elected in the Falkirk constituency.
  - A man who posted threats to kill 200 people on social networking site Facebook leading to school closures in the US state of Tennessee is jailed for 28 months at Newcastle Crown Court.
  - The option of imposing a whole life tariff for the worst murders in England and Wales is ruled illegal by the European Court of Human Rights following a legal challenge by three convicted murderers serving such sentences. They are Jeremy Bamber, Douglas Vinter and Peter Moore, who are among a group of at least 49 prisoners in England and Wales serving such sentences. The sentence is not an option in Scotland. The legal decision is overturned on appeal.
- 11 July – party leaders criticise Independent Parliamentary Standards Authority recommendations to increase MPs annual salaries by £6,000 to £74,000 from 2015.
- 12 July – the funeral of murdered fusilier Lee Rigby takes place in Bury; attendees include Prime Minister David Cameron.
- 13 July – two soldiers die during a training exercise on the Brecon Beacons on one of the hottest days of the year. The Ministry of Defence works with Dyfed-Powys Police to investigate. On 30 July a third soldier dies in hospital.
- 15 July – the House of Lords approves the Marriage (Same Sex Couples) Bill, enabling gay marriages to take place in England and Wales from 2014.
- 16 July – Health Secretary Jeremy Hunt announces that eleven hospitals will be placed in special measures because of major failings.
- 17 July
  - Rising temperatures lead to heat health warnings being issued for Southern England and the Midlands in the UK's first prolonged heatwave since 2006.
  - Same-sex marriage becomes legal in England and Wales after the Marriage (Same Sex Couples) Act 2013 receives Royal Assent.
- 22 July
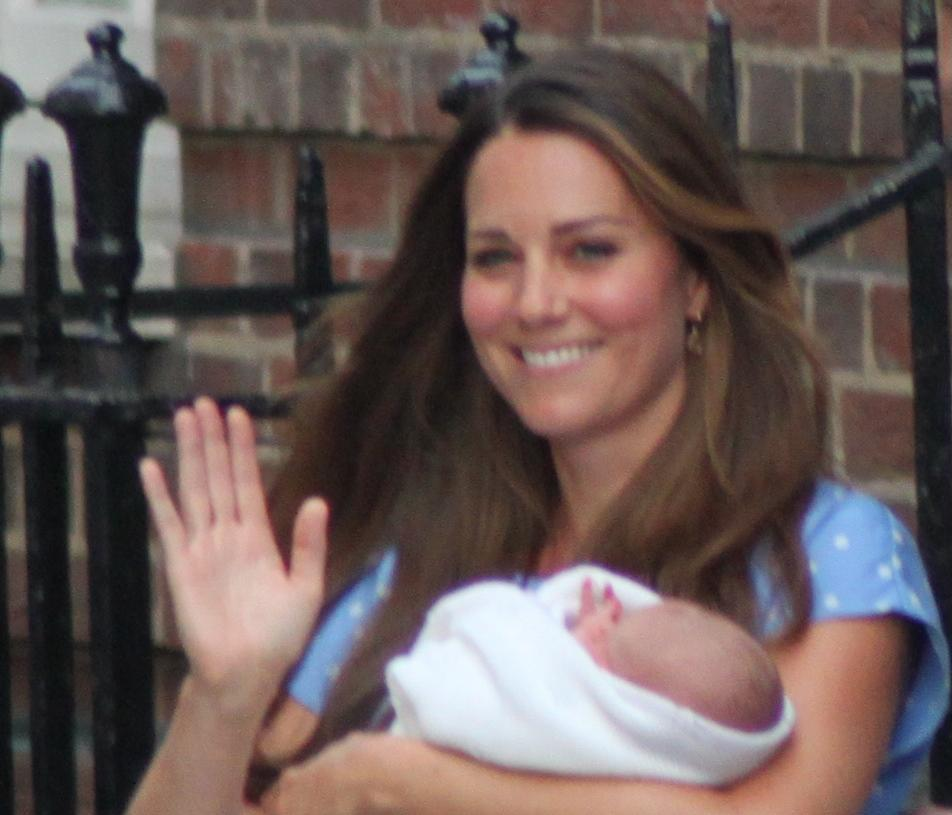
  - The Duchess of Cambridge with her newborn baby
    Prime Minister David Cameron announces plans for every household in the UK to have pornography automatically blocked by their internet provider unless they choose otherwise. The possession of online material depicting rape will also become illegal in England and Wales, bringing them into line with current Scottish legislation.
  - The UK records its hottest day since July 2006, with 33.5C (92.3F) recorded at Heathrow and Northolt in west London.
  - Home Office "Go Home" vans begin to tour areas of London with high immigrant populations.
  - Catherine, Duchess of Cambridge (later Princess of Wales) gives birth to a boy at St Mary's Hospital, London who becomes third in line to the throne and Queen Elizabeth II's third great-grandchild. He is subsequently named George Alexander Louis.
- 23 July – overnight thunderstorms bring the three-week heat wave to an end.
- 27 July – six people are taken to hospital after a double-decker bus has its roof ripped off by a bridge in Stockport, Greater Manchester.
- 31 July – administrators recommend the dissolution of Mid Staffordshire NHS Trust after it went into administration in April.

=== August ===
- 1 August – temperatures of 33.7C are recorded at Heathrow Airport and 34.1 in London – the hottest since 2006 – as the hot weather makes a brief return. The Met Office says it is the hottest day since 2003 and the warmest summer since 2006.
- 2 August – Magdelena Luczak and her partner, Mariusz Krezolek, are jailed for life with a minimum of 30 years for the murder of Luczak's four-year-old son Daniel Pelka, who was starved, then beaten to death, in Coventry. The perpetrators both die in prison within three years (of suicide and heart attack respectively).
- 3 August – Tony Wang, head of Twitter, apologises after women received bombing and rape threats by users of the site. The apology comes as the company updates its rules to help clamp down on threats and harassment.
- 5 August – the world's first lab-grown burger – produced from bovine stem cells – is cooked and eaten at a news conference in London.
- 6 August – it is reported that sewage workers from Thames Water have removed a fifteen ton bus-sized "fatberg" – thought to be Britain's largest – from a sewer beneath London, after the mass caused a 95% blockage and threatened to send raw sewage spurting from manhole covers.
- 7 August – Bank of England governor Mark Carney says the Bank will not consider raising interest rates until the unemployment rate has fallen to 7% or below.
- 8 August – BPP University College of Professional Studies, a for-profit institution under US ownership at this time, is granted the title of university as BPP University.
- 10 August – 56 police officers are injured in Belfast after a night of loyalist rioting.
- 19 August
  - Senior politicians urge police to explain why the partner of a Guardian journalist who published leaked documents from US whistleblower Edward Snowden was detained at Heathrow Airport for nine hours.
  - Green MP Caroline Lucas and her son are among protesters arrested at a site in West Sussex where energy firm Cuadrilla is drilling for oil.
  - The chief executive of the UK Independence Party, Will Gilpin, steps down from his post.
- 20 August – Britons Michaella McCollum and Melissa Reid are formally charged with attempting to smuggle £1.5m worth of cocaine out of Peru. They are remanded in custody the following day.
- 21 August – an inspection report reveals that a female inmate at HMP Bronzefield was kept in solitary confinement for more than five years.
- 22 August – Yes Scotland is forced to close its computer systems after being hacked by "forces unknown". Police Scotland's Digital Forensic Unit launches an investigation but uncovers no evidence of criminality.
- 23 August – a Super Puma L2 helicopter crashes near Sumburgh Airport in the Shetland Islands, resulting in four fatalities among the oil rig workers being carried. Operation of the helicopter model is globally suspended.
- 27 August – David Cameron recalls Parliament from its summer recess to discuss responses to the Syrian crisis in the wake of a chemical weapons attack in Damascus.
- 29 August
  - MPs vote 285–272 against the principle of British involvement in any military intervention in the Syrian conflict.
  - Members of the Fire Brigades Union vote to take industrial action in a dispute over pensions, threatening the first firefighters' strike across England, Scotland and Wales since 2002.

=== September ===
- 3 September – the Library of Birmingham, the largest public library in the UK, is opened.
- 5 September – sixty people are injured as more than 130 vehicles are involved in a series of crashes in thick fog on the Sheppey Crossing in Kent.
- 7 September – a man is arrested on suspicion of burglary, trespass and criminal damage after scaling a fence to get into Buckingham Palace.
- 10 September – MP Nigel Evans resigns as a Deputy Speaker of the House of Commons after being charged with sexual offences.
- 11 September – Conservative Party chairman Grant Shapps writes to the UN Secretary General demanding an explanation after a UN official criticised housing benefit changes as a "disgrace".
- 14 September – Robert Lund, who was convicted of the 1999 murder of his wife Evelyn, is released from prison in France.
- 20 September – UKIP withdraws the party whip from MEP Godfrey Bloom after he referred to female activists as "sluts" during his party's annual conference.
- 24 September – at its annual conference, Labour leader Ed Miliband says that if elected in 2015, his party would freeze energy prices for their first 20 months in office.
- 25 September
  - Firefighters in England and Wales stage a four-hour strike in a dispute over changes to their pensions.
  - Chessington World of Adventures bans animal print clothing because it says animals at the wildlife park find it confusing.
- 27 September – Prime Minister David Cameron rejects an invitation for a head-to-head TV debate on Scottish independence with Scotland's First Minister Alex Salmond

=== October ===
- 3 October – The Mail on Sunday editor Geordie Greig issues an unreserved apology to Ed Miliband after a reporter was sent to a private memorial service for one of his relatives in an attempt to gather opinions from his family about a recent Daily Mail article that had accused the Labour Leader's late father, Ralph of hating Britain. Two reporters are suspended as a result of the incident.
- 7 October – launch of the National Crime Agency, a new body designed to tackle some of Britain's most serious crimes.
- 8 October
  - Banks begin to unveil details of the mortgages they will offer under the government's expanded Help to Buy scheme.
  - The Scottish Government announces that the loss making Prestwick Airport in Glasgow is to be taken into public ownership.
  - British physicist Peter Higgs is awarded the Nobel Prize in Physics for his theory of the Higgs boson.
- 10 October – Justice Minister Jeremy Wright confirms that former Liberian President Charles Taylor will serve his jail sentence for war crimes in the UK.
- 11 October – the UK government publishes a draft Royal Charter aimed at underpinning self-regulation of the press following an agreement by the three main political parties. However, the proposals are greeted with concerns about press freedom by the industry. Proposals put forward by the press has previously been rejected by the Privy council.
- 15 October – former Liberian President Charles Taylor arrives in the UK to serve the remainder of his 50-year prison sentence, the first head of state to be convicted of war crimes since World War II.
- 18 October – a planned firefighters strike in England and Wales for the following day is called off at the eleventh hour, following progress in talks over pensions.
- 19 October – The Sidemen are formed.
- 20 October – about 100 homes are damaged when a "tornado" hits Hayling Island in Hampshire.
- 21 October – the government approves Hinkley Point C, the first nuclear plant to be constructed in the UK since 1995. Originally due to be completed in 2023, the date is later changed to 2028. The plant is intended to remain operational for 60 years, supplying about 7% of the country's electricity.
- 22 October – former Prime Minister John Major calls for the government to levy a windfall tax on Britain's energy companies after three of the six major gas and electricity suppliers raise their prices by between eight and ten percent.
- 23 October – Prime Minister David Cameron announces a review of green energy taxes after saying they had pushed up household bills to "unacceptable" levels.
- 26 October – the Rugby League World Cup begins.
- 28 October – St Judes Day storm: 99 mph gust recorded at the Needles on the Isle of Wight
- 30 October – the Privy council grants a Royal charter on press regulations after the newspaper industry loses a last minute legal bid to seek an injunction against the plans.

=== November ===
- 1 November – firefighters in England and Wales stage a four and a half-hour strike in a row over pension ages, as "contingency" crews battle a large scrapyard blaze in London.
- 14 November – the last living British person to be born in the 1800s, Grace Jones, dies aged 113.
- 18 November – Prime Minister David Cameron welcomes a decision by search engine companies Google and Microsoft to block online images of child abuse.
- 20 November – the General Synod of the Church of England votes in favour of legislation to allow the ordination of women as bishops by 2014.
- 21 November
  - Former non-executive chairman of the Co-operative Bank Paul Flowers is arrested by police in a drugs supply investigation, having been exposed agreeing to buy cocaine and methamphetamine by The Mail on Sunday newspaper. Flowers is also suspended from the Labour Party and Methodist Church as a result of the allegations.
  - It is reported that three women believed to have been held as slaves for the last three decades were rescued from a residence in London on 25 October.
- 23 November – the fiftieth anniversary of science fiction TV series Doctor Who is celebrated with the broadcast and cinema screenings of the anniversary special "The Day of the Doctor".
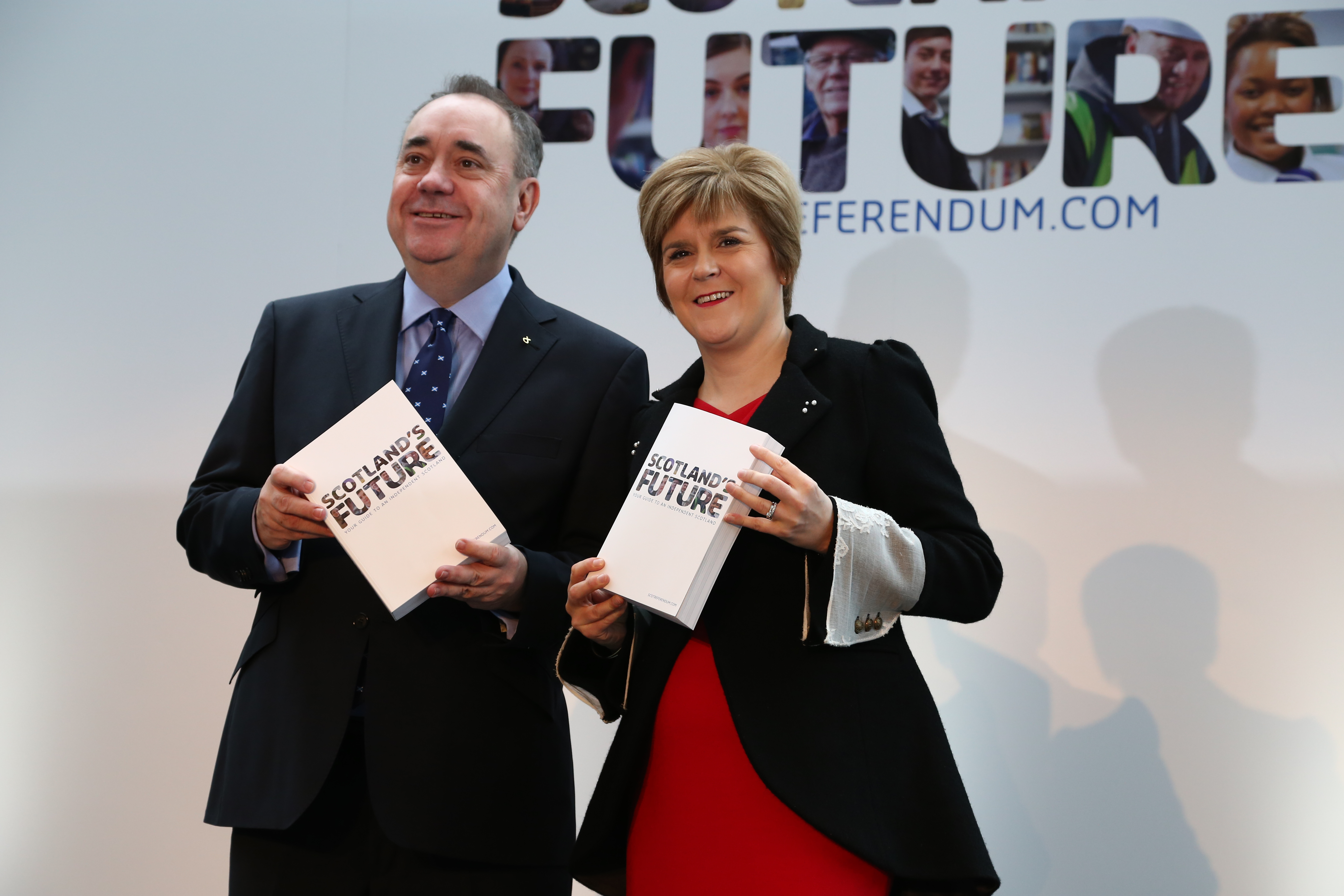
  Alex Salmond and Nicola Sturgeon launch the Scottish independence White Paper
- 26 November – Scotland's First Minister Alex Salmond launches the Scottish Government's White Paper setting out its vision for an independent Scotland.
- 27 November – following a trial at Northampton Crown Court, businessman Anxiang Du is convicted of the 2011 murder of a family of four in a revenge attack after losing a legal case against them.
- 29 November – eight people are killed and 19 seriously injured after a police helicopter crashes into The Clutha pub in Glasgow.

=== December ===
- 4 December – pig semen exports from Britain to China are the subject of a protocol signed in Beijing by Environment Secretary Owen Paterson as part of a trade mission that includes the Prime Minister, David Cameron. The Chinese wish to improve their semen stock from boars in England and Northern Ireland.
- 5 December – Cyclone Bodil hits the UK, Netherlands, Denmark and Germany, disrupting traffic and causing widespread damage amid fears of flooding along the North Sea coast.
- 15 December – Andy Murray wins BBC Sports Personality of the Year 2013.
- 16 December – Home Secretary Theresa May announces draft legislation to introduce tougher prison sentences for people convicted of offences relating to human trafficking.
- 19 December – part of the ornate ceiling of the Apollo Theatre in London collapses during a performance, injuring at least 81 people in the audience.
- 20 December – following a trial at Isleworth Crown Court, sisters Elisabetta and Francesca Grillo, who worked as personal assistants to food writer Nigella Lawson and her husband Charles Saatchi for several years, are found not guilty on charges of stealing from the couple.
- 23 December
  - Former MP Denis MacShane is sentenced to six months in jail for expenses fraud after he admitted to submitting 19 false receipts totalling £12,900.
  - World War II computer pioneer and codebreaker Alan Turing, who had been chemically castrated in 1952 following his conviction for homosexuality, is given a posthumous royal pardon.

== Publications ==
- The Quarry novel by Iain Banks
- Diary of A Wimpy Kid: Hard Luck by Jeff Kinney

== Births ==
- 22 July – Prince George of Wales

== Deaths ==
=== January ===
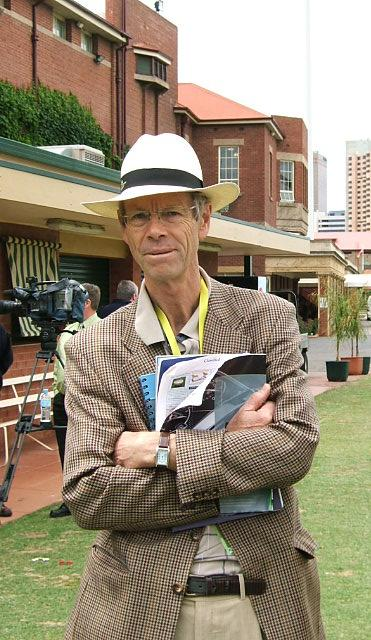
Christopher Martin-Jenkins 1945–2013

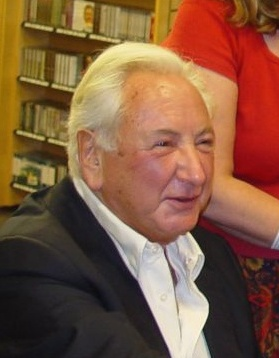
Michael Winner 1935–2013

- 1 January
  - Allan Hancox, 80, judge, Chief Justice of Kenya (1989–1993).
  - Christopher Martin-Jenkins, 67, cricket journalist (Test Match Special), xancer.
- 2 January
  - Beatrice Bolam, 93, politician.
  - Charles Chilton, 95, BBC Radio writer, producer and presenter (Journey into Space).
- 3 January
  - Sir Robert Clark, 89, naval officer and businessman.
  - George Falconer, 66, Scottish footballer (Dundee, Raith Rovers).
  - Alfie Fripp, 98, RAF pilot, longest-serving British POW during World War II.
  - Jimmy Halliday, 85, leader of the Scottish National Party from 1956 to 1960.
- 4 January
  - Sir Geoffrey de Bellaigue, 81, Surveyor of the Queen's Works of Art (1972–1996).
  - Derek Kevan, 77, footballer (West Bromwich Albion).
  - Jim Watson, 95, politician, Mayor of Blackburn (1982–1983).
- 5 January
  - Gwendoline Butler, 90, author.
  - Mary Susan McIntosh, 76, sociologist, feminist, political activist and campaigner for lesbian and gay rights.
- 7 January
  - Stanley Cohen, 70, sociologist.
  - Jeremy Hindley, 69, horse trainer, motor neurone disease.
- 8 January
  - Alasdair Milne, 82, television producer and former Director-General of the BBC.
  - Percy White, 96, chemist and nuclear scientist.
- 9 January
  - Brigitte Askonas, 89, immunologist.
  - Peter Carson, 74, publisher, editor and translator.
  - Jim Godbolt, 90, jazz writer and historian.
  - Trevor Gordon, 64, singer (The Marbles).
  - Tarsem King, Baron King of West Bromwich, 75, politician and peer.
  - Harold Searson, 88, footballer.
- 10 January – Geoffrey Coates, 95, organometallic chemist.
- 11 January
  - David Chisnall, 64, rugby league player (Warrington Wolves).
  - Tom Parry Jones, 77, inventor (electronic breathalyser).
  - Robert Kee, 93, author, journalist and broadcaster.
  - James Charles Macnab of Macnab, 86, aristocrat, chief of Clan MacNab.
- 12 January
  - Anthony Cavendish, 85, MI6 officer.
  - Helen Elliot, 85, table tennis player, world champion (1949 and 1950).
  - Harry Fearnley, 77, footballer.
  - Roy Sinclair, 68, footballer (Watford)
- 13 January
  - Stanley Caine, 76, actor (The Italian Job).
  - Katie Stewart, 78, cookery writer.
  - Geoff Thomas, 64, footballer (Swansea City).
- 14 January
  - Danny Beath, 52, photographer and botanist.
  - Tony Conran, 81, poet and translator.
  - Maharani Gina Narayan, 82, British-born Indian royal, second wife of the Maharaja of Cooch Behar, Jagaddipendra Narayan.
- 15 January – Daphne Anderson, 90, stage and film actress.
- 16 January
  - Peter Barnes, 50, helicopter pilot (Vauxhall helicopter crash).
  - Nic Potter, 61, bassist (Van der Graaf Generator).
- 17 January
  - Sophiya Haque, 41, actress, singer and dancer.
  - Paul McKeever, 57, police officer, Chairman of the Police Federation of England and Wales.
  - Lizbeth Webb, 86, soprano and stage actress.
- 18 January – Ken Jones, 77, footballer.
- 19 January
  - Nick Broad, 38, football coach and nutritionist.
  - John Trim, 88, linguist.
  - Ian Wells, 48, footballer.
- 20 January – Freddie Williams, 86, speedway racer.
- 21 January
  - Zina Harman, 98, British-born Israeli politician.
  - Inez McCormack, 66, trade union leader and human rights campaigner.
  - Michael Winner, 77, film director, producer and food critic.
- 22 January – Kevin Ash, 53, motorcycling journalist.
- 23 January
  - Jimmy Payne, 86, footballer.
  - Dolours Price, 62, Northern–Irish IRA member.
- 24 January
  - Yemi Ajibade, 82, playwright and actor.
  - Dave Harper, 74, footballer.
  - Jim Wallwork, 93, World War II glider pilot.
- 25 January
  - Leila Buckley, 96, poet, novelist and translator.
  - Frank Keating, 75, sports writer.
- 26 January
  - Peter Beales, 76, British rosarian, author and lecturer.
  - Lesley Fitz-Simons, 51, actress (Take the High Road).
- 27 January – Acer Nethercott, 35, coxswain, Olympic silver medallist (2008) and two-time Boat Race winner.
- 28 January – Reg Jenkins, 74, footballer (Rochdale).
- 29 January
  - Malcolm Brodie, 86, sports journalist.
  - Frank Hahn, 87, economist (Hahn's Problem).
  - Bernard Horsfall, 82, actor (Doctor Who, Gandhi, Braveheart).
  - Herbert Loebl, 89, businessman and philanthropist.
  - David Taylor, 78, veterinarian and TV personality (No. 73).
- 31 January – Ron Hadfield, 73, police officer, Chief Constable of West Midlands Police (1990–1996).

=== February ===
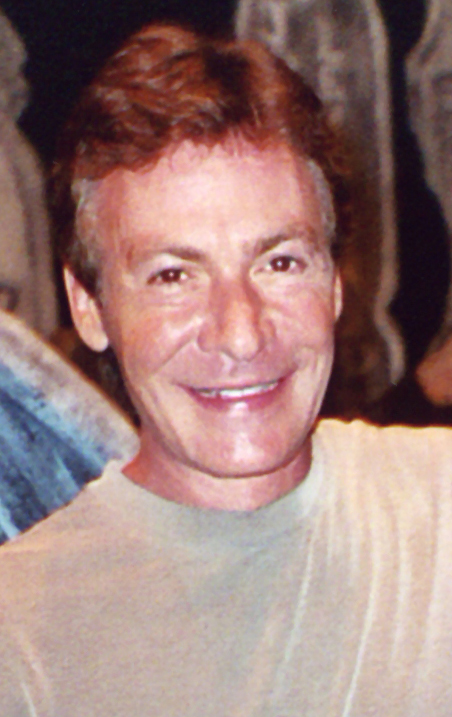
Robin Sachs

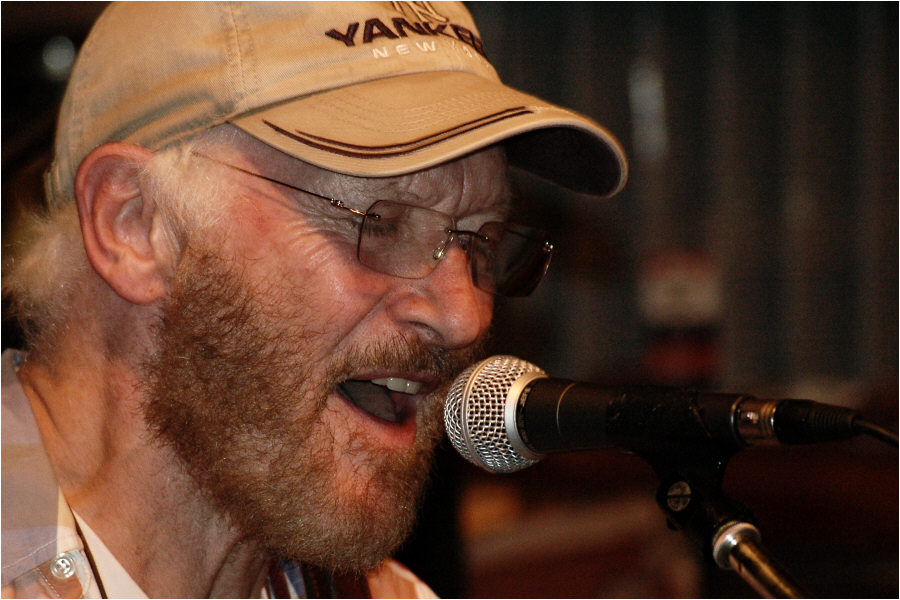
Tony Sheridan

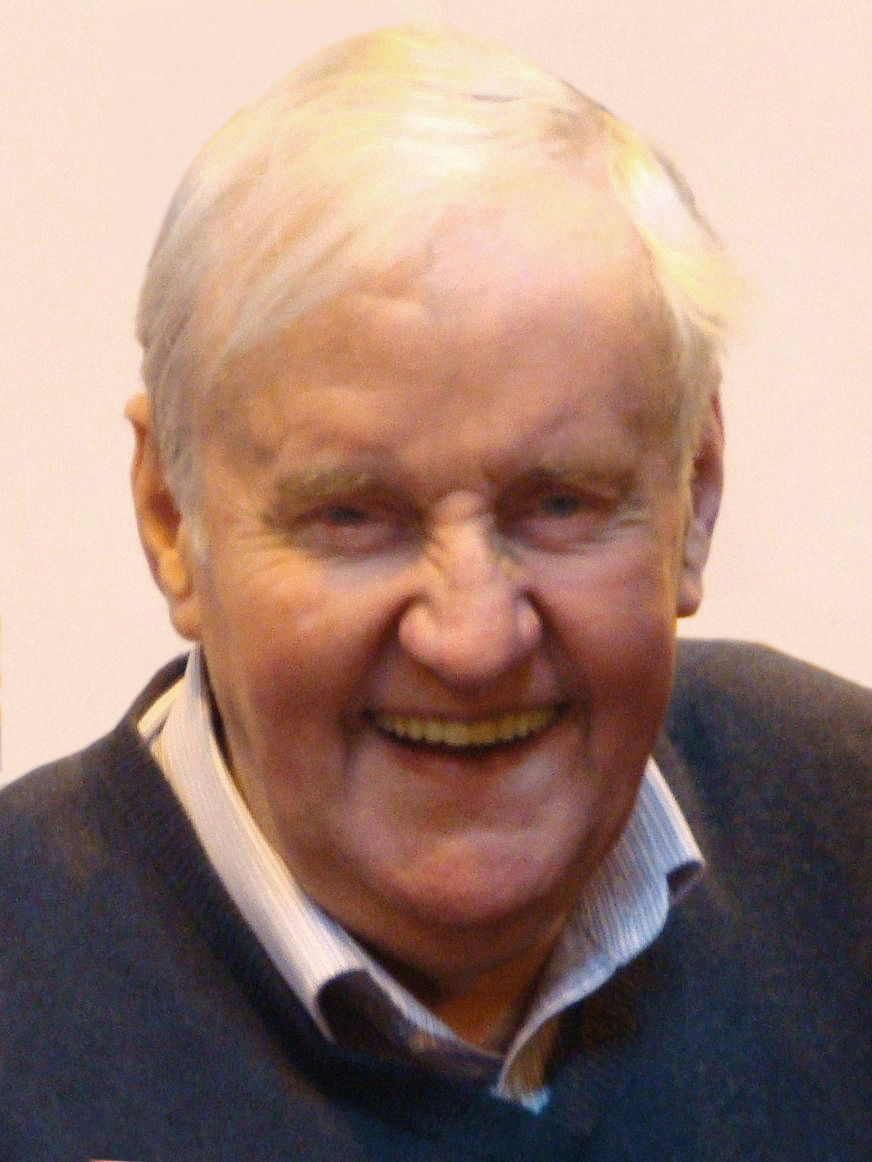
Richard Briers

- 1 February – Robin Sachs, 61, actor (Buffy the Vampire Slayer).
- 3 February
  - Peter Gilmore, 81, actor (The Onedin Line, Carry On, Doctor Who).
  - David Oates, 50, sports commentator (BBC Sport).
- 4 February
  - Pat Halcox, 82, jazz trumpeter.
  - Reg Presley, 71, singer (The Troggs) and songwriter ("Love Is All Around").
- 5 February
  - Stuart Freeborn, 98, make-up artist (Star Wars, 2001: A Space Odyssey).
  - Gerry Hambling, 86, film editor (Pink Floyd – The Wall, Midnight Express, In the Name of the Father).
  - Charles Longbottom, 82, politician, MP for York (1959–1966).
  - Derek Yalden, 72, zoologist.
- 6 February – Frank Stirrup, 88, English rugby league player. (death announced on this date)
- 7 February
  - Keith Marsh, 86, actor (Love Thy Neighbour) (death announced on this date)
  - Jonathan Rendall, 48, author (death announced on this date)
- 8 February
  - Ron Hansell, 82, footballer.
  - Patricia Hughes, 90, radio announcer.
  - Ian Lister, 65, footballer (Aberdeen, Dunfermline Athletic).
  - Mervyn McCord, 83, army officer.
  - Alan Sharp, 79, screenwriter (Rob Roy, Night Moves).
- 9 February
  - Robert Ashton, 88, historian.
  - Mike Banks, 90, mountaineer and Royal Marines officer.
- 10 February
  - Pery Burge, 57, artist.
  - Norman Crowder, 87, priest, Archdeacon of Portsmouth (1985–1993).
  - Sir John Gilmour, 4th Baronet, 68, soldier and aristocrat.
  - Bill Roost, 88, footballer (Bristol Rovers).
- 11 February
  - Mark Dalby, 75, prelate, Archdeacon of Rochdale (1991–2000).
  - Trevor Grills, 54, singer (Fisherman's Friends).
  - Richard Hill, 7th Baron Sandys, 81, peer and landowner.
  - Rick Huxley, 72, musician (The Dave Clark Five).
- 12 February
  - Bill Bell, 81, businessman, Chairman of Port Vale F.C. (1987–2002).
  - Brian Langford, 77, cricketer (Somerset).
  - Richard Orton, 72, composer and academic.
  - Reginald Turnill, 97, aerospace correspondent (BBC).
- 13 February
  - John Ammonds, 88, television producer.
  - George Finch, 82, architect.
  - David Lister, 82, origami historian.
  - Rita Ridley, 66, runner.
  - Don Scott, 84, boxer, Olympic silver medal (1948).
- 14 February
  - Sir Montague Levine, 90, doctor and coroner.
  - Peter Olver, 95, World War II fighter ace.
- 15 February
  - Hector Catling, 88, archaeologist.
  - Pat Derby, 70, animal trainer.
  - Ian Fowler, 73, journalist.
  - Antony Speller, 83, politician, MP for North Devon (1979–1992).
- 16 February
  - Paul Rice, 64, cricketer.
  - Tony Sheridan, 72, rock and roll singer, early collaborator with The Beatles.
- 17 February
  - Derek Batey, 84, English quiz show host (Mr. and Mrs.).
  - Richard Briers, 79, actor (The Good Life).
  - David Whitehouse, 71, museum executive (Corning Museum of Glass).
- 18 February
  - Kevin Ayers, 68, psychedelic rock songwriter and musician (Soft Machine, Wilde Flowers).
  - Godfrey Hewitt, 73, evolutionary geneticist.
  - James Irvine, 54, furniture designer.
  - Elspet Gray, Baroness Rix, 83, actress and philanthropist.
- 20 February
  - John Downie, 87, footballer.
  - Emma McDougall, 21, footballer (Blackburn Rovers W.F.C.).
- 21 February
  - John Clappison, 75, ceramic and glass designer.
  - Raymond Cusick, 84, TV designer (Doctor Who).
  - Bruce Millan, 85, politician, MP for Glasgow Craigton (1959–1983); Glasgow Govan (1983–1988), Secretary of State for Scotland (1976–1979).
  - Dick Neal, Jr., 79, footballer.
- 22 February – Bob Godfrey, 91, animator (Henry's Cat, Roobarb, Great).
- 23 February
  - Sylvia Smith, 67, writer.
  - Sir Richard Worsley, 89, army general.
- 24 February
  - Dave Charlton, 76, racing driver.
  - Sir Denis Forman, 95, television executive, Chairman of Granada Television (1974–1987).
- 25 February – Ralph P. Martin, 87, New Testament scholar.
- 26 February – Adrian Hollis, 72, correspondence chess grandmaster.
- 27 February
  - Robin M. Hochstrasser, 82, chemist.
  - Molly Lefebure, 93, author.
  - Terry Twell, 66, footballer.
- 28 February
  - Neil McCorkell, 100, cricket player.
  - Seamus O'Connell, 83, footballer.
  - Bruce Reynolds, 81, Great Train Robber

=== March ===
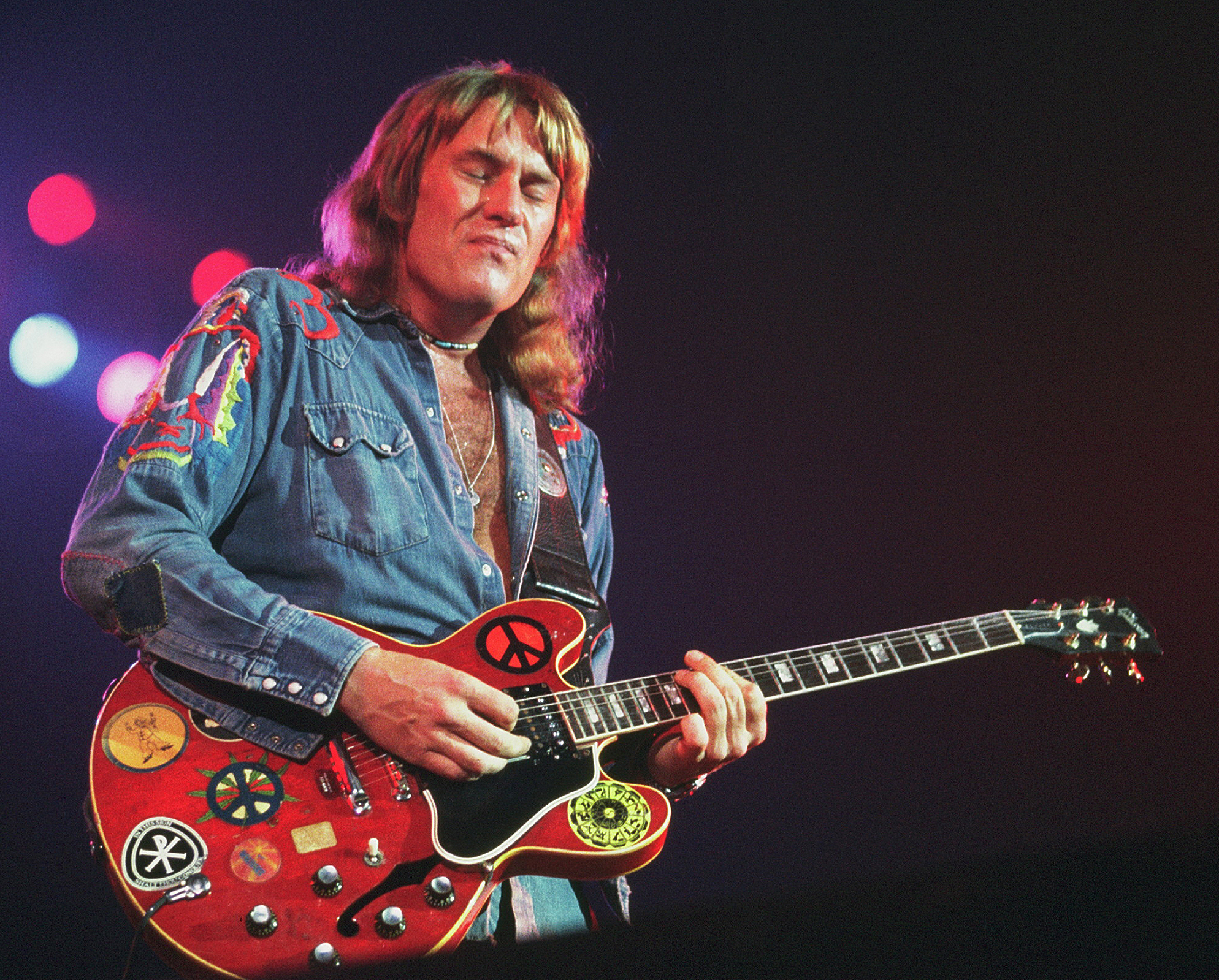
Alvin Lee in 1975

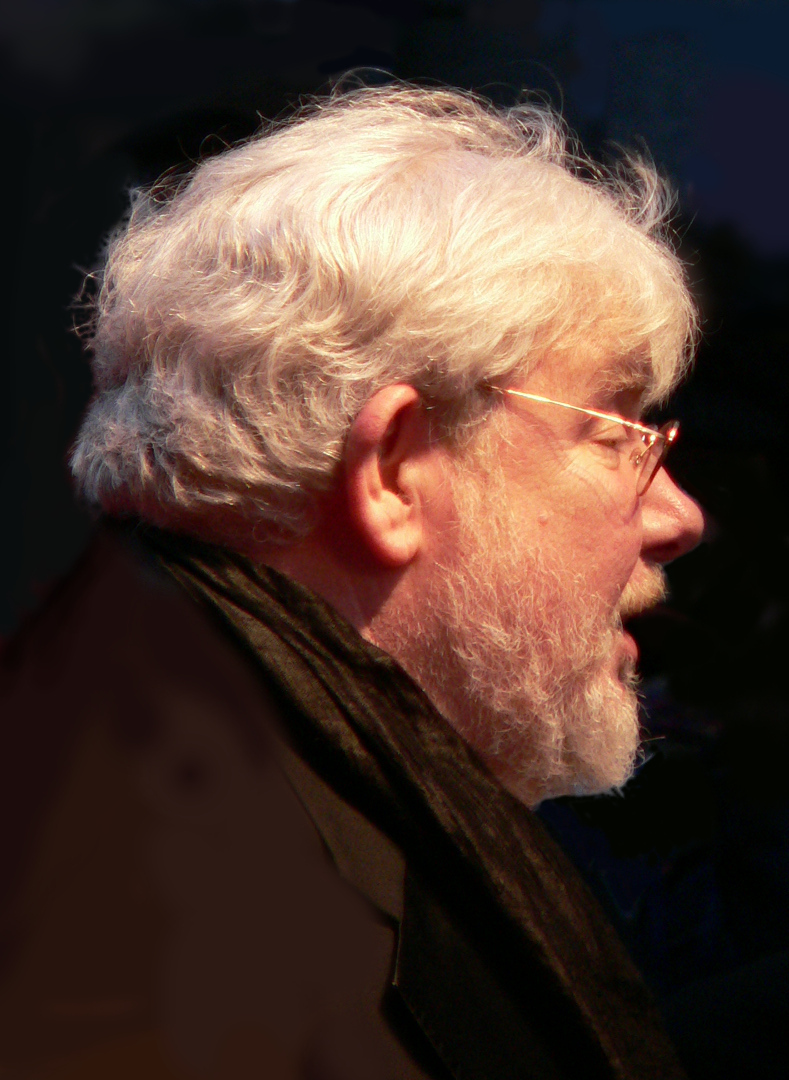
Richard Griffiths in 2007

- 1 March
  - Campbell Armstrong, 69, author.
  - Chris Canavan, 84, actor (Coronation Street).
  - Pat Keen, 79, actress.
  - Trevor Morley, 79, cricketer.
  - Alan Smith, 95, World War II Spitfire fighter ace.
- 2 March – Jimmy Jackson, 81, footballer (Notts County F.C.).
- 3 March – Junior Heffernan, 23, racing cyclist.
- 4 March
  - Harry Greene, 89, actor and television personality, creator of Changing Rooms and DIY SOS.
  - George Petherbridge, 85, footballer.
- 5 March – Nigel Forbes, 22nd Lord Forbes, 95, soldier, businessman and politician, Minister of State for Scotland (1958–1959).
- 6 March
  - Dave Bewley, 82, footballer.
  - Sir Norman King, 79, admiral.
  - Alvin Lee, 68, guitarist (Ten Years After).
- 7 March
  - Kenny Ball, 82, jazz trumpeter.
  - Peter Banks, 65, rock guitarist (Yes).
  - Max Ferguson, 89, British-born Canadian radio broadcaster.
  - Dick Graham, 90, football manager (Colchester United F.C.).
  - Stan Keery, 81, footballer.
  - Jeffrey Skitch, 85, opera singer and educator.
- 8 March
  - Ricardo da Force, dance music singer.
  - Toby Graham, 92, Olympic (1956) cross-country skier and university professor.
  - Charles Thurstan Shaw, 98, archaeologist.
- 9 March – David Farmbrough, 83, Anglican prelate, Bishop of Bedford (1981–1993).
- 10 March
  - Geoff Braybrooke, 77, British–born New Zealand politician, MP for Napier (1981–2002).
  - Stanley Crowther, 87, politician, MP for Rotherham (1976–1992).
  - Ian Munro Ross, 85, British-born American engineer and scientist, President of Bell Labs (1979–1991).
- 11 March – Tony Gubba, 69, journalist and sports commentator.
- 12 March
  - Clive Burr, 56, rock drummer (Iron Maiden).
  - Michael Grigsby, 76, documentary filmmaker.
  - Gordon Pembery, 86, footballer.
- 13 March
  - Philip Crosfield, 88, Anglican priest.
  - Jack Marston, 64, rugby league player.
- 14 March
  - Norman Collier, 87, comedian
  - Harry Thomson, 72, footballer (Burnley F.C.).
- 15 March
  - Bernard Cheese, 88, painter and printmaker.
  - Terry Lightfoot, 77, jazz clarinetist.
  - Peter Worsley, 88, sociologist.
  - Marcel van Cleemput, 86, toy designer (Corgi).
- 16 March
  - David Mills, 75, cricketer.
  - Frank Thornton, 92, actor.
- 17 March – Peter Scott, 82, burglar.
- 19 March
  - Ryan Birch, 42, judoka.
  - Sir Fergus Montgomery, 85, politician, MP for Newcastle upon Tyne East (1959–1964), Brierley Hill (1967–1974) and Altrincham and Sale (1974–1997).
- 20 March
  - James Herbert, 69, horror fiction writer.
  - George Lowe, 89, New Zealand mountaineer, died in Derbyshire.
  - Jack Stokes, 92, animation director (Yellow Submarine).
- 21 March
  - Angus Carmichael, 87, footballer.
  - David Fisher, 66, artist.
- 22 March
  - Bernard Green, 60, historian.
  - Freddie Jones, 75, footballer (Hereford United, Brighton).
  - Jimmy Lloyd, 73, Olympic boxer.
  - Derek Watkins, 68, trumpeter, played on every James Bond soundtrack.
- 23 March
  - Boris Berezovsky, 67, Russian business oligarch, died in Berkshire.
  - David Bond, 90, Olympic sailor.
- 24 March
  - Bob Colston, 84, television announcer (World of Sport).
  - Francis Hovell-Thurlow-Cumming-Bruce, 8th Baron Thurlow, 101, diplomat.
  - Derek Leaver, 82, footballer.
- 25 March
  - Peter Hearn, 88, cricket player (Kent).
  - Jean Pickering, 83, Olympic track and field athlete.
- 26 March – Michael Gow, 88, army general.
- 28 March
  - George E. P. Box, 93, Statistician.
  - John Findlater, 86, meteorologist.
  - Richard Griffiths, 65, actor (Withnail and I, Harry Potter), complications after heart surgery.
- 29 March
  - Barrie Dobson, 81, historian.
  - István Hont, 65, historian.
  - Brian Huggins, 81, journalist and actor (Trailer Park Boys).
- 30 March – Brian Ackland-Snow, 72, production designer (A Room with a View).
- 31 March
  - Helena Carroll, 84, actress.
  - Ray Drake, 78, footballer (Stockport County F.C.).
  - Sir Michael Jenkins, 77, diplomat, Ambassador to the Netherlands (1988–1993).
  - Derek Leaver, 82, footballer (Blackburn Rovers F.C.).

=== April ===
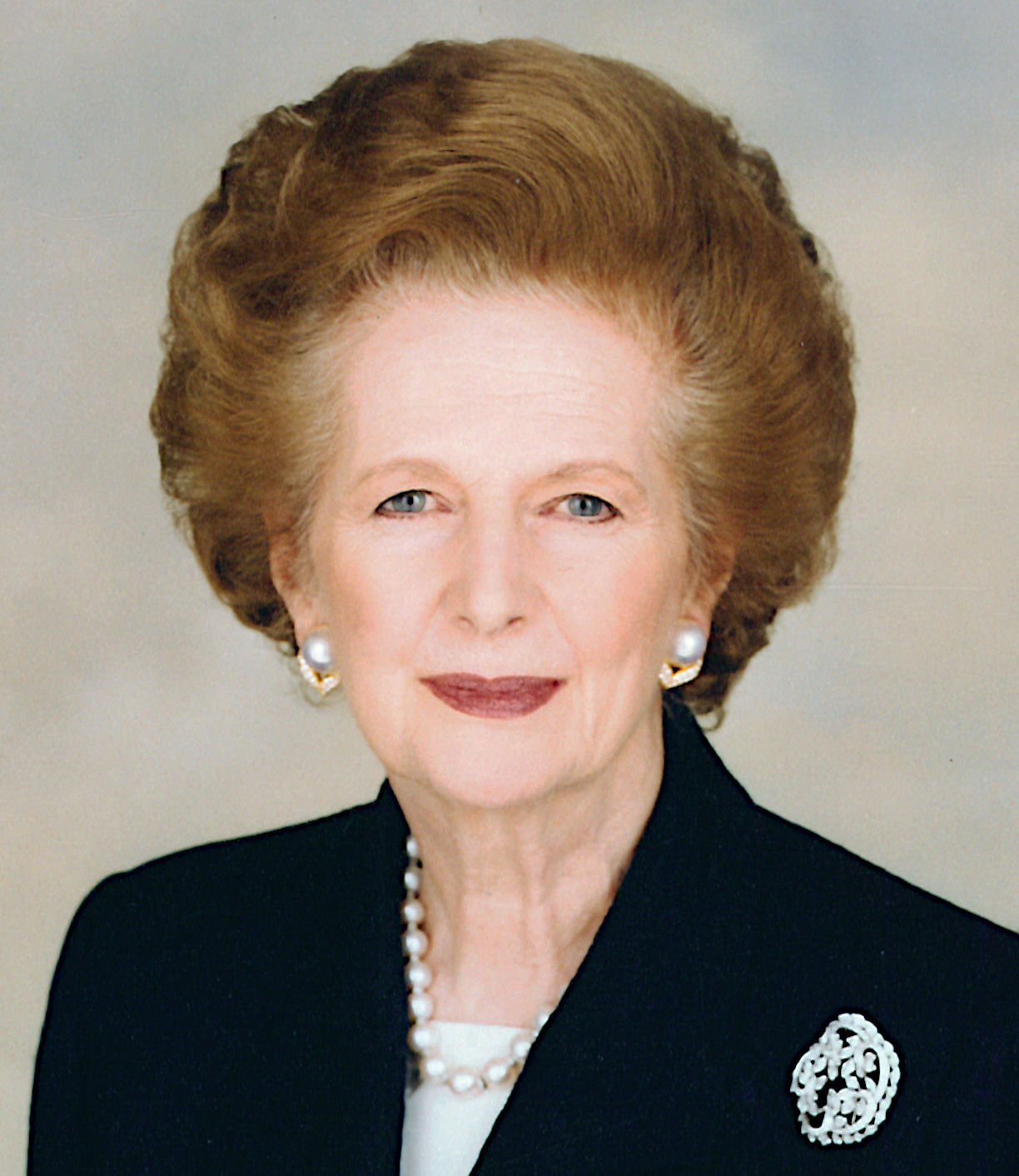
Margaret Thatcher 1925–2013

- 1 April
  - Peter Drewett, 64, archaeologist.
  - Anthony Montague Browne, 89, diplomat and civil servant.
- 2 April
  - Kurt Hellmann, 90, pharmacologist.
  - Ted James, 88, cricket player (Sussex).
  - Adrian Leftwich, 72–73, political activist and academic.
  - Barry Mealand, 70, footballer (Fulham).
- 3 April
  - Ralph Brown, 85, sculptor.
  - Douglas Freeman, 96, cricketer.
- 4 April
  - Fergy Brown, 90, Scottish-born Canadian politician, Mayor of York, Ontario (1988–1994).
  - Basil Copper, 89, writer.
  - Joseph Pease, 3rd Baron Gainford, 81, aristocrat.
- 5 April – Peter Maxwell, 92, film and television director.
- 6 April
  - Bill Guttridge, 82, footballer (Walsall F.C.)
  - Michael Norgrove, 31, boxer.
  - Alan Protheroe, 79, television executive.
- 7 April
  - Andy Johns, 62, record producer (Led Zeppelin, The Rolling Stones).
  - Sir Kenneth Murray, 82, biologist.
- 8 April
  - Leslie Broderick, 91, military officer, one of the last three survivors of The Great Escape".
  - Anne Fitzalan-Howard, Duchess of Norfolk, 85, peeress and charity worker.
  - Greg Kramer, 51, actor (300, On the Road) and author.
  - Ronald Osborne, 66, businessman, Chairman of Postmedia Network (since 2010), Sun Life Financial (2005–2010), CEO of Maclean-Hunter (1986–1994).
  - Frank Panton, 89, military scientist.
  - Margaret Thatcher, 87, politician, Prime Minister (1979–1990).
- 9 April
  - Desmond Hamill, 76, television journalist.
  - Jim McAllister, 68, Northern Irish politician.
- 10 April
  - Sir Robert Edwards, 87, physiologist, winner of Nobel Prize (2010).
  - Gordon Thomas, 91, Olympic silver medal cyclist (1948), won Tour of Britain (1953).
- 11 April – Thomas Hemsley, 85, opera singer.
- 12 April
  - Sir John Burgh, 87, civil servant, Director-General of the British Council (1980–1987).
  - Dennis John, 78, footballer.
- 13 April
  - Roger Dobson, 58, writer.
  - Ian Henderson, 86, colonial police officer.
  - Mary Ponsonby, Countess of Bessborough, 98, aristocrat and philanthropist, saved Benjamin Franklin's London home.
  - Stephen Dodgson, 89, composer.
- 14 April
  - Ian Balfour, 2nd Baron Balfour of Inchrye, 88, hereditary peer.
  - Sir Colin Davis, 85, orchestral conductor.
- 16 April
  - Ernle Money, 82, politician, MP for Ipswich (1970–1974).
  - Edwin Shirley, 64, rock tour organiser and film studio manager.
- 17 April
  - Steuart Pringle, 84, army general.
  - Paul Ware, 42, footballer.
  - Stan Vickers, 80, Olympic bronze long distance walker (1960).
- 18 April
  - Jack Price, 94, football player (Hartlepool United F.C.).
  - Storm Thorgerson, 69, graphic designer.
  - Anne Williams, 62, activist (Hillsborough disaster).
- 19 April
  - Clive Best, 82, rugby league player (Barrow).
  - Mike Denness, 72, cricketer, captain of Kent (1972–1976) and England (1974–1975).
  - Patrick Garland, 78, theatre director, actor and writer.
  - John Willson, 81, diplomat.
- 20 April
  - Jocasta Innes, 78, non-fiction writer and businesswoman.
  - Nosher Powell, 84, actor, stuntman (Willow, First Knight) and boxer.
- 21 April – Jimmy McGill, 87, footballer (Queen of the South).
- 22 April
  - Struther Arnott, 78, biochemist and academic, Principal of St Andrews University (1986–1999).
  - Benjamin Milstein, 94, surgeon and academic.
- 23 April
  - Tony Grealish, 56, footballer (Ireland, Brighton).
  - Ralph Johnson, 91, footballer (Norwich City F.C.).
  - Norman Jones, 78, television actor (Doctor Who, Crossroads).
  - Jim Mackonochie, Royal Navy officer and video game developer.
  - Jim Mortimer, 91, trade unionist, General Secretary of the Labour Party (1982–1985).
  - Frank W. J. Olver, 88, mathematician.
- 24 April
  - James Dickens, 82, politician, MP for Lewisham West (1966–1970).
  - Frank Salvat, 78, Olympic runner (1960).
- 25 April
  - Brian Adam, 64, politician, MSP for North East Scotland (1999–2003), Aberdeen North (2003–2011) and Aberdeen Donside (since 2011).
  - Sean Caffrey, 73, actor.
  - W. B. Young, 96, rugby union player.
- 26 April
  - Donald Chapman, Baron Northfield, 89, politician, MP for Birmingham Northfield (1951–1970).
  - Sir Guy Millard, 96, diplomat.
- 27 April – Lorraine Copeland, 92, archaeologist and Special Operations Executive agent.
- 28 April – Alf Bellis, 92, footballer.
- 29 April – Kevin Moore, 55, footballer (Grimsby Town, Southampton).
- 30 April
  - Paul Shurey, 53, concert and rave promoter (Tribal Gathering).
  - Ian Weathrall, 91, missionary (Delhi Brotherhood Society).

=== May ===
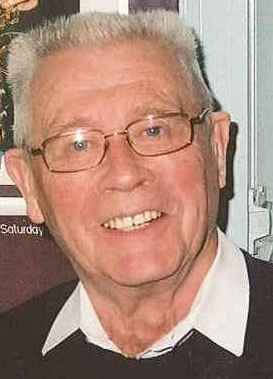
Billy Raymond

- 1 May – Stuart Wilde, 66, writer.
- 2 May
  - Terence Beckett, 89, businessman, Director-General of the Confederation of British Industry.
  - Ernie Field, 70, boxer.
  - Allen McKay, 86, politician, MP for Penistone (1978–1983) and Barnsley West and Penistone (1983–1992).
  - Jo Pitt, 34, paralympic equestrian.
- 3 May – David Innes Williams, 93, paediatric urologist.
- 4 May
  - Frederic Franklin, 98, ballet dancer and director.
  - Sir Morgan Morgan-Giles, 98, Royal Navy officer and politician, MP for Winchester (1964–1979).
- 5 May – Alan Arnell, 79, footballer (Liverpool F.C.).
- 6 May
  - Dame Diana Keppel, Dowager Countess of Albemarle, 103, aristocrat.
  - Steve Carney, 55, footballer (Newcastle United F.C.).
  - Ian MacLeod, 53, footballer (Motherwell).
  - Steve Martland, 53, composer.
- 7 May
  - P. G. Lim, 96, lawyer and Malaysian diplomat.
  - Aubrey Woods, 85, actor (Doctor Who, Willy Wonka & the Chocolate Factory).
- 8 May
  - Bryan Forbes, 86, actor (The League of Gentlemen), film director (The Stepford Wives) and screenwriter (Chaplin).
  - Ken Whaley, 67, rock musician (Man, Ducks Deluxe, Help Yourself).
  - Ernie Winchester, 68, footballer.
- 9 May – Andrew Simpson, 36, competition sailor.
- 10 May
  - Sir John Bush, 98, Royal Navy admiral, Commander-in-Chief Western Fleet (1967–1970).
  - Malcolm Clarke, 82, marine biologist.
  - Hugh Mackay, 14th Lord Reay, 75, peer, Member of the European Parliament (1973–1979), member of the House of Lords (since 1964).
  - Malcolm Parkes, 83, academic.
- 11 May
  - Joe Farman, 82, physicist, identified ozone hole.
  - Arnold Peters, 87, actor (The Archers).
- 12 May – George William Gray, 86, scientist.
- 13 May – Derrick Thomas, 69, agricultural researcher.
- 14 May – Billy Raymond, 75, television presenter.
- 15 May
  - Robert Hunt, 77, police officer.
  - Bill O'Hagan, 68, journalist and sausage maker.
  - James Stuart-Smith, 93, judge and army officer, Advocate General of the Armed Forces (1984–1991).
- 16 May
  - Frank Nigel Hepper, 84, botanist.
  - Paul Shane, 72, actor and comedian (Hi-de-Hi!, You Rang, M'Lord?).
- 17 May
  - Anthony Trickett, 73, doctor, Lord Lieutenant of Orkney (2007–2013).
  - Rodney Sweetnam, 86, surgeon, President of the Royal College of Surgeons (1995–98).
- 18 May – Arthur Malet, 85, stage, film and television actor.
- 19 May
  - Robin Harrison, 80, composer and pianist.
  - Franklin White, 90, ballet dancer.
- 20 May
  - Denys Roberts, 90, colonial official and judge, Chief Justice of Hong Kong (1979–1988).
- 21 May
  - Trevor Bolder, 62, rock musician (David Bowie, Uriah Heep).
  - Eddie Braben, 82, comedy writer (Morecambe and Wise, Ken Dodd).
  - Keith Jukes, 59, Anglican clergyman, Dean of Ripon (since 2007).
- 22 May
  - Brian Greenhoff, 60, footballer (Manchester United F.C.).
  - Elizabeth Mavor, 85, author.
  - Mick McManus, 93, professional wrestler.
  - Richard Thorp, 81, actor (Emmerdale).
- 24 May
  - Ron Davies, 70, footballer Norwich, Southampton.
  - Garth Morrison, 70, Scouter, Chief Scout (1988–1996).
- 25 May – Jimmy Wray, 75, politician, MP for Glasgow Provan (1987–1997) and Glasgow Baillieston (1997–2005).
- 26 May – Graham Leggett, 92, RAF squadron leader, youngest surviving pilot of the Battle of Britain.
- 27 May – Bill Pertwee, 86, radio and television actor (Dad's Army, You Rang, M'Lord?) and author.
- 29 May – Richard Ballantine, 72, cycling writer.
- 30 May – Michael Baillie, 3rd Baron Burton, 88, peer.
- 31 May
  - Tommy Henderson, 85, footballer (Burnley F.C.).
  - Frederic Lindsay, 79, novelist.

=== June ===
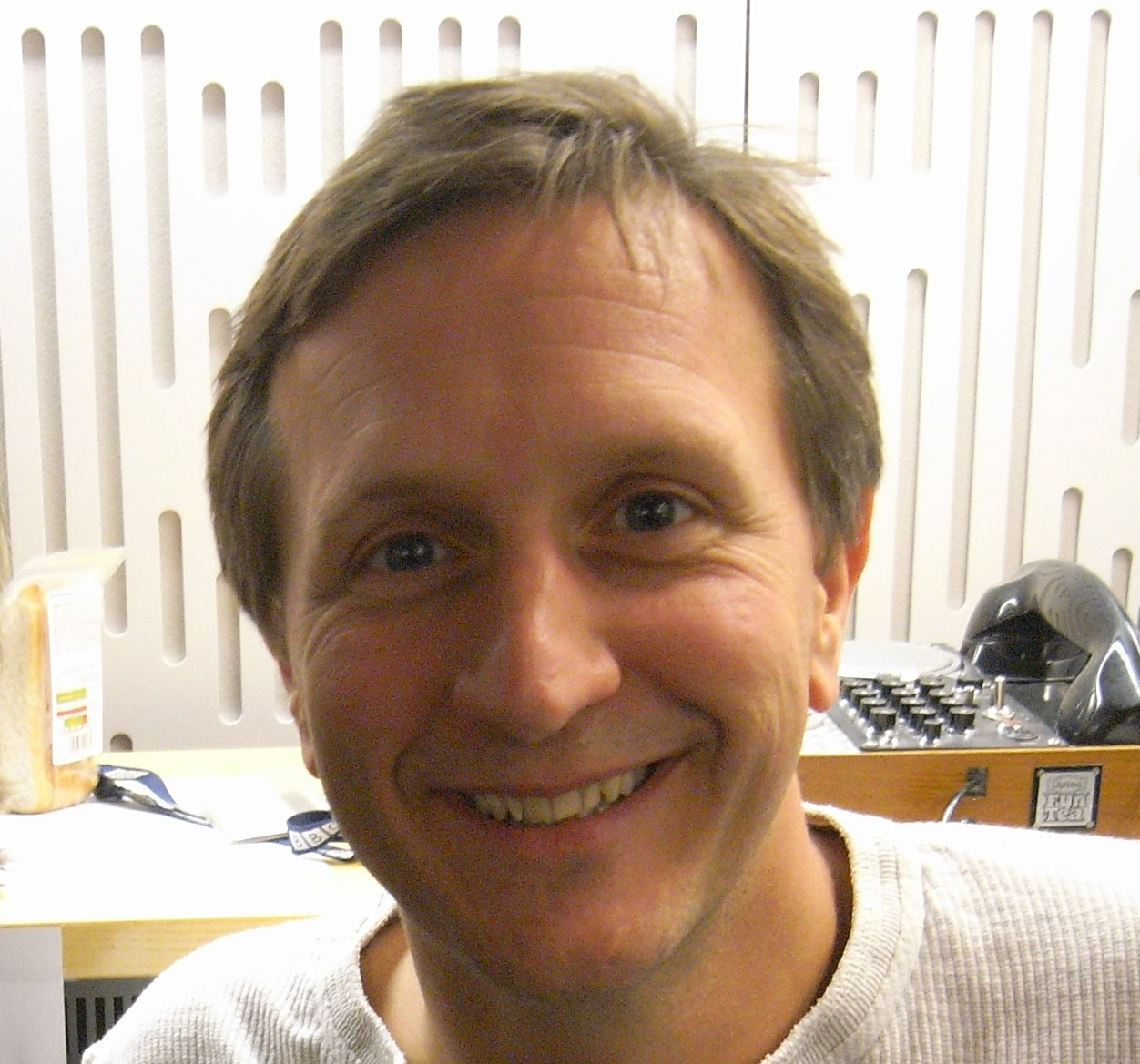
Rory Morrison

- 1 June
  - Oliver Bernard, 87, poet and translator.
  - Bill Gunston, 86, aviation writer.
- 2 June
  - Andrew Doughty, 96, anaesthetist.
  - John Gilbert, Baron Gilbert, 86, politician and life peer, MP for Dudley (1970–1974), Dudley East (1974–1997) and Minister for Transport (1975–1976).
  - Nick Keir, 60, musician.
  - Graham Walker, 68, comedian, founder of The Grumbleweeds
- 4 June – Patrick Nairne, 91, civil servant, Permanent Secretary to the Department of Health and Social Security (1975–1981).
- 5 June
  - Sir James Bottomley, 92, diplomat, Ambassador to South Africa (1973–1976).
  - Helen McElhone, 80, politician, MP for Glasgow Queen's Park (1982–1983).
  - Katherine Woodville, 74, actress (Posse, The Informers).
- 6 June
  - Tom Sharpe, 85, comic novelist (Porterhouse Blue, Wilt).
  - Malcolm Todd, 73, historian and archaeologist.
- 7 June
  - Donna Hartley, 58, Olympic runner (1980).
  - David Lyon, 72, actor.
  - Mark Starr, 50, wrestler.
- 8 June
  - Angus MacKay, 86, actor (Doctor Who).
  - Hugh Murray, 80, historian.
- 9 June
  - Iain Banks, 59, author.
  - Martin Bernal, 76, academic.
  - John Burke, 65, rugby league player.
- 10 June – Don Roby, 79, footballer (Notts County F.C., Loughborough United F.C.).
- 11 June
  - Henry Cecil, 70, racehorse trainer.
  - Rory Morrison, 48, radio announcer and newsreader (BBC Radio 4).
- 12 June
  - Cheryl Peake, 47, Olympic ice skater (1988).
  - Gavin Taylor, 72, British television and concert film director, (The Tube, U2 at Red Rocks, Queen at Wembley).
  - Barry Till, 90, priest and academic.
- 14 June
  - Martin Lowson, 75, aeronautical engineer.
  - Hugh Maguire, 86, violinist.
- 15 June – Maurice Priestley, 80, mathematician.
- 16 June
  - Richard Marlow, 74, organist and choral director.
  - Norman Ian MacKenzie, 91, journalist and activist.
  - Peter Millar, 62, footballer (Motherwell).
- 17 June
  - Jim Goddard, 77, film and television director.
  - Geoff Strong, 75, footballer.
- 18 June
  - Alastair Donaldson, 58, rock musician.
  - Colin Stansfield Smith, 80, architect and cricketer.
  - David Wall, 67, ballet dancer.
- 19 June – John Hughes, 78, ceramicist, creator of Grogg.
- 20 June
  - John Stollery, 83, engineer and academic.
  - John David Wilson, 93, animator (Lady and the Tramp, Grease, The Sonny & Cher Comedy Hour).
- 21 June
  - Diane Clare, 74, actress.
  - Bernard Hunt, 83, professional golfer.
  - Edgar Mann, 86, Manx politician, Chairman of the Executive Council (1981–1985).
- 22 June – Deric Longden, 77, author and screenwriter.
- 23 June
  - Pat Ashton, 82, actress.
  - Peter Fraser, Baron Fraser of Carmyllie, 68, Scottish politician and advocate, MP (1979–1987), Lord Advocate (1989–1992), Solicitor General (1982–1989).
  - Darryl Read, 61, musician, poet and actor.
- 24 June
  - Mick Aston, 66, British archaeologist (Time Team).
  - Bill Atkinson, 68, footballer (Torquay United F.C.).
  - Dame Phyllis Friend, 90, nursing officer.
  - James Martin, 79, businessman, author and computer scientist.
- 25 June
  - Mark Fisher, 66, stage designer and ceremony producer (2008, 2012 Summer Olympics).
  - Catherine Gibson, 82, Olympic swimmer (1948).
- 28 June – Fred Gibson, 101, Jamaican-born cricketer (Leicestershire).
- 29 June – David Moore, 79, botanist.
- 30 June – Alan Campbell, Baron Campbell of Alloway, 96, life peer, barrister and Colditz prisoner.

=== July ===
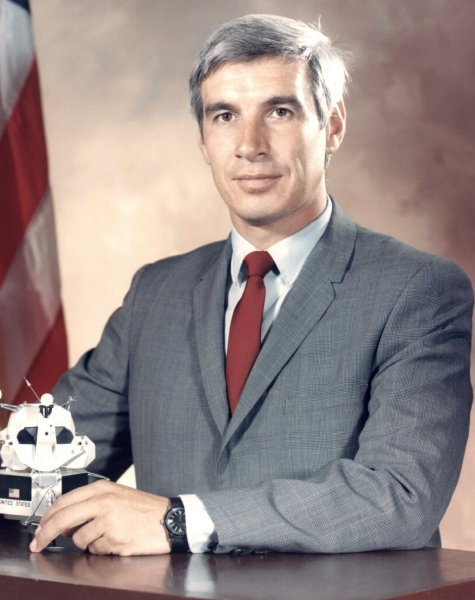
NASA portrait of Anthony Llewellyn

- 2 July – Anthony Llewellyn, 80, scientist and NASA astronaut.
- 3 July
  - Iain McColl, 59, actor.
  - John Nunn, 94, Royal Air Force officer and politician.
  - Snoo Wilson, 64, playwright and screenwriter.
- 4 July
  - Onllwyn Brace, 80, rugby union player.
  - Jack Crompton, 91, footballer (Manchester United F.C.), played 1948 FA Cup Final.
  - Willie Hargreaves, 82, rugby league player (York City Knights).
  - Bernie Nolan, 52, singer (The Nolans) and actress.
  - Leslie Rees, 94, Anglican prelate, Bishop of Shrewsbury (1980–1986).
  - Pamela Ropner, 82, author.
- 5 July – Sheila Wright, 88, politician, MP for Birmingham Handsworth (1979–1983).
- 6 July
  - David Johnson, 67, horse owner (Comply or Die).
  - Kay Matheson, 84, Scottish nationalist and scholar, Stone of Scone seizure.
- 7 July
  - Rosalind Hudson, 86, codebreaker and architectural model maker.
  - Anna Wing, 98, actress (EastEnders).
- 8 July
  - Norman Atkinson, 90, politician, MP for Tottenham (1964–1987).
  - Dave Hickson, 83, footballer.
- 9 July
  - Kirsty Milne, 49, journalist and academic.
  - George Weissbort, 85, artist.
- 10 July
  - Colin Bennetts, 72, Anglican prelate, Bishop of Coventry (1998–2008).
  - William Ralph Turner, 93, painter.
- 12 July
  - Paul Bhattacharjee, 52, actor (EastEnders, Casino Royale, The Best Exotic Marigold Hotel).
  - Ray Butt, 78, television director and producer (Only Fools and Horses).
  - Pratap Chitnis, Baron Chitnis, 77, politician, Head of the Liberal Party (1966–1969).
  - Elaine Morgan, 92, writer, feminist and evolutionary theorist (The Descent of Woman, The Aquatic Ape).
  - Alan Whicker, 87, journalist and broadcaster (Whicker's World)
- 13 July – Henry Paget, 7th Marquess of Anglesey, 90, peer and author.
- 14 July – Jenny Lay, 74, politician, Lord Mayor of Norwich.
- 16 July
  - Todd Bennett, 51, Olympic runner (1988) and silver medalist (1984).
  - George Smith, 92, footballer (Manchester City F.C.).
- 17 July
  - Henri Alleg, 91, journalist.
  - David Collins, 57, restaurant designer (Gordon Ramsay at Royal Hospital Road, The Wolseley).
  - Sir Ian Gourlay, 92, army general, Commandant General Royal Marines (1971–1975).
  - Briony McRoberts, 56, actress (Take the High Road).
  - Davie White, 80, football player and manager (Clyde, Rangers, Dundee).
- 18 July
  - Peter Appleyard, 84, jazz musician and composer.
  - Norman Sillman, 92, sculptor and coin designer.
- 19 July
  - Wilf Proudfoot, 91, politician, businessman and hypnotist, MP for Cleveland (1959–1964); Brighouse and Spenborough (1970–1974).
  - Mel Smith, 60, comedian and actor (Not the Nine O'Clock News, Alas Smith and Jones).
  - Phil Woosnam, 80, football player, coach and commissioner (North American Soccer League).
- 20 July – David Spenser, 79, radio play performer (Just William), actor and producer.
- 22 July – Lawrie Reilly, 84, footballer (Hibernian F.C., national team).
- 23 July
  - Rona Anderson, 86, film, television and stage actress (Scrooge, The Prime of Miss Jean Brodie).
  - Pauline Clarke, 92, children's author.
- 24 July – Adrian Shepherd, 74, conductor and cellist.
- 25 July
  - Peter Bridgeman, 80, military officer.
  - Hugh Huxley, 89, biologist, won Copley Medal (1997).
- 27 July
  - Mick Farren, 69, music journalist, author and singer (The Deviants).
  - Jon Leyne, 55, journalist (BBC News).
  - John Nunneley, 90, army officer.
  - Pete Tunstall, 94, RAF squadron leader, World War II POW in Colditz.
- 29 July
  - Bernard Codd, 79, motorcycle racer.
  - Norman de Mesquita, 81, sports journalist and broadcaster.
  - Godfrey Stafford, 93, physicist.
  - Sheila Whitaker, 77, film programmer, director of London Film Festival (1987–1996).
- 30 July
  - Sir Reginald Harland, 93, Royal Air Force commander.
  - Benjamin Walker, 99, author.
- 31 July
  - Michel Donnet, 96, military officer, RAF wing commander during World War II.
  - Jon Manchip White, 89, novelist and screenwriter.

=== August ===
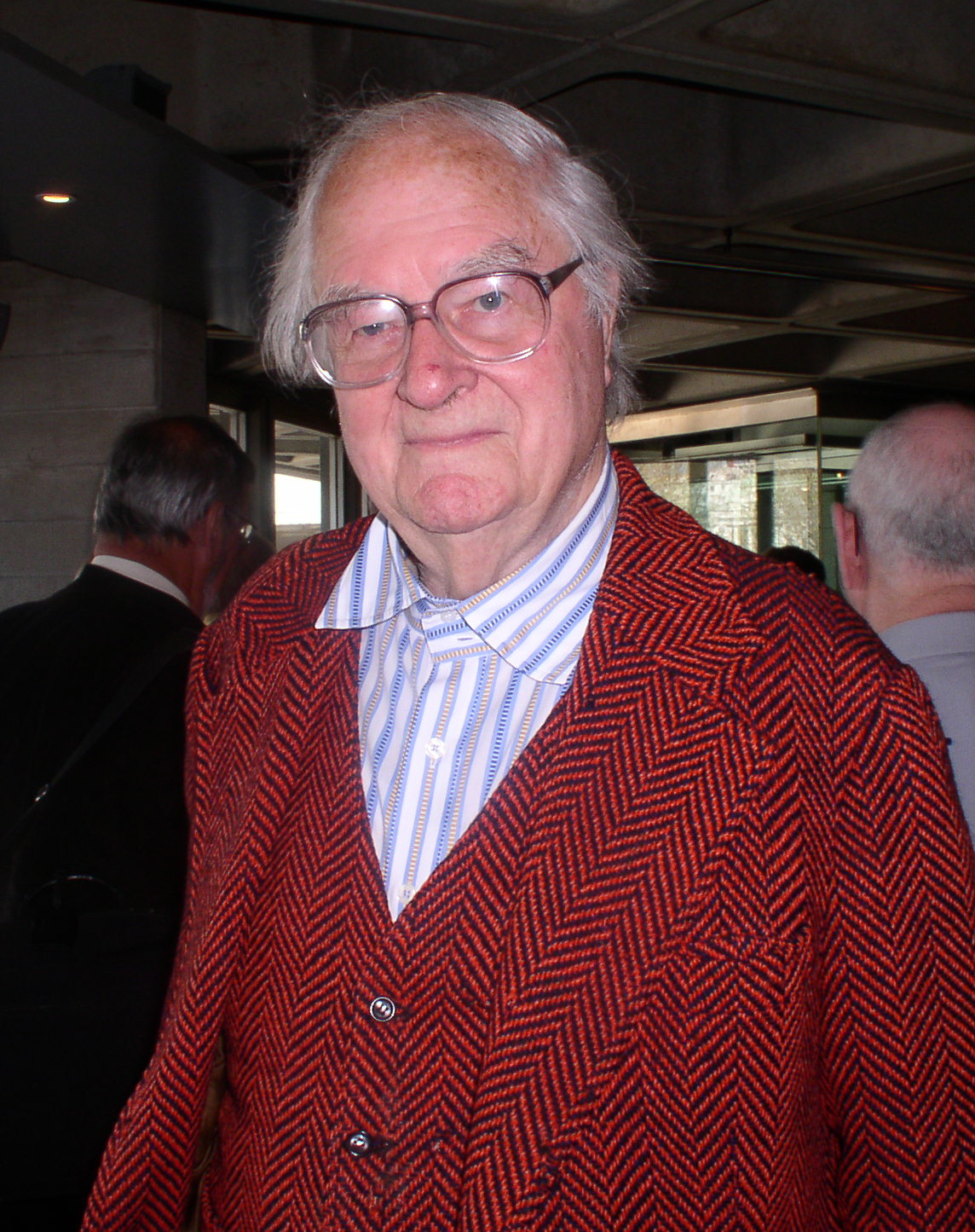
John Amis in 2010

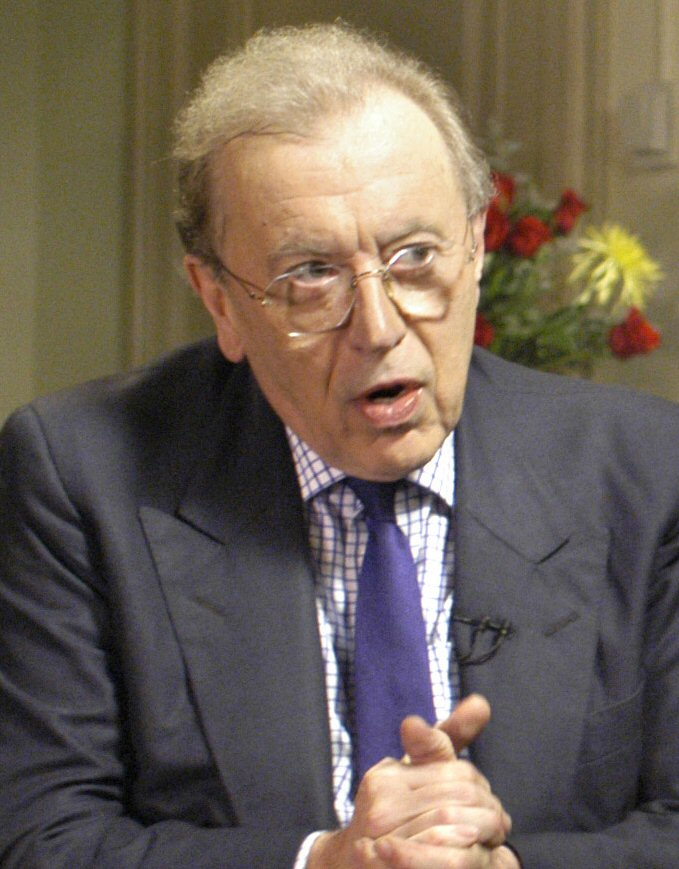
Sir David Frost

- 1 August
  - John Amis, 91, broadcaster, classical music critic and writer.
  - Colin McAdam, 61, footballer.
- 3 August
  - John Coombs, 91, racing driver and team owner.
  - Jack Hynes, 92, footballer.
- 4 August
  - John Billingham, 83, space executive (NASA), chief of life science at Ames Research Center.
  - Wilf Carter, 79, footballer (Plymouth Argyle).
  - Dominick Harrod, 72, journalist, BBC economics correspondent.
  - Bill Hoskyns, 82, Olympic fencer (1960, 1964).
  - Tony Snell, 91, RAF fighter pilot.
  - Sir Sandy Woodward, 81, Royal Navy admiral (Falklands War).
- 5 August – Malcolm Barrass, 88, footballer (Bolton Wanderers F.C.)
- 6 August
  - Steve Aizlewood, 60, footballer (Newport County A.F.C., Portsmouth F.C.).
  - Jeremy Geidt, 83, stage actor and acting coach (Harvard University, American Repertory Theater).
  - Dave Wagstaffe, 70, footballer (Wolverhampton Wanderers F.C., Manchester City F.C., Blackburn Rovers F.C.).
- 7 August
  - Roy Davies, 79, Anglican prelate, Bishop of Llandaff (1985–1999).
  - Keith Skillen, 65, footballer (Workington A.F.C.).
- 8 August
  - Derek Hockridge, 79, British actor and translator (Asterix).
  - Jimmy McColl, 88, Olympic footballer (1948).
  - John Rankine, 94, science fiction author.
- 9 August
  - Louis Killen, 79, musician, folk singer and songwriter.
  - Brian Moll, 88, television actor.
  - Phill Nixon, 57, darts player.
- 11 August
  - David Howard, 76, ballet teacher.
  - Matthew Kaufman, 70, biologist.
- 12 August
  - David McLetchie, 61, politician, MSP for Lothian (1999–2003, since 2011) and Edinburgh Pentlands (2003–2011).
  - Trevor Storer, 83, businessman and entrepreneur, founder of Pukka Pies.
  - Robert Trotter, 83, actor (Take the High Road), director and photographer.
- 13 August
  - Jon Brookes, 44, drummer (The Charlatans).
  - Johnny Hamilton, 78, footballer.
  - Sir Michael Stoker. 95, physician.
- 14 August
  - Mick Deane, 61, television cameraman (Sky News), shot during a raid in Egypt.
  - John Forfar, 96, paediatrician and academic.
  - Mark Sutton, 42, stuntman, parachutist at 2012 Summer Olympics opening ceremony as James Bond.
- 16 August
  - Chris Hallam, 49, Paralympian swimmer and wheelchair racer.
  - David Rees, 95, mathematician.
  - John Ryden, 82, football player (Tottenham Hotspur F.C).
- 18 August – Christopher Barton, 85, Olympic rower (1948).
- 19 August – Stephenie McMillan, 71, Academy Award-winning set decorator (The English Patient, Chocolat, Harry Potter).
- 20 August
  - Leslie Jaeger, 87, civil engineer and academic.
  - Marian McPartland, 95, jazz pianist, writer, composer and radio host (Piano Jazz).
- 21 August
  - Huw Jenkins, 68, cricket player (Glamorgan).
  - Fred Martin, 84, footballer (Aberdeen).
- 22 August
  - Sir Geoffrey Inkin, 78, soldier and public servant.
  - William McIlroy, 85, secularist and atheism activist.
- 23 August
  - David Garrick, 66, pop and opera singer.
  - Gilbert Taylor, 99, cinematographer (Star Wars, The Omen, Dr. Strangelove).
  - David Watkins, 87, politician, MP for Consett (1966–1983).
- 24 August
  - Gerry Baker, 75, footballer (Ipswich Town F.C., Manchester City F.C.).
  - Mike Winters, 82, comedian (Mike and Bernie Winters).
- 25 August – Frederick Wilfrid Lancaster, 80, information scientist.
- 26 August – Gerard Murphy, 64, actor (Batman Begins, Doctor Who, Waterworld).
- 27 August
  - David Barker, 75, physician and epidemiologist.
  - Dave Thomas, 79, golfer and golf course designer.
- 28 August
  - John Bellany, 71, painter.
  - Barry Stobart, 75, footballer.
- 29 August – Cliff Morgan, 83, rugby player and broadcaster.
- 30 August – Seamus Heaney, 74, writer. He was awarded the Nobel Prize in Literature in 1995.
- 31 August
  - Alan Carrington, 79, chemist.
  - Sir David Frost, 74, broadcaster and journalist (That Was the Week That Was, The Frost Report).
  - Jimmy Greenhalgh, 90, football player and manager (Darlington F.C.).

=== September ===
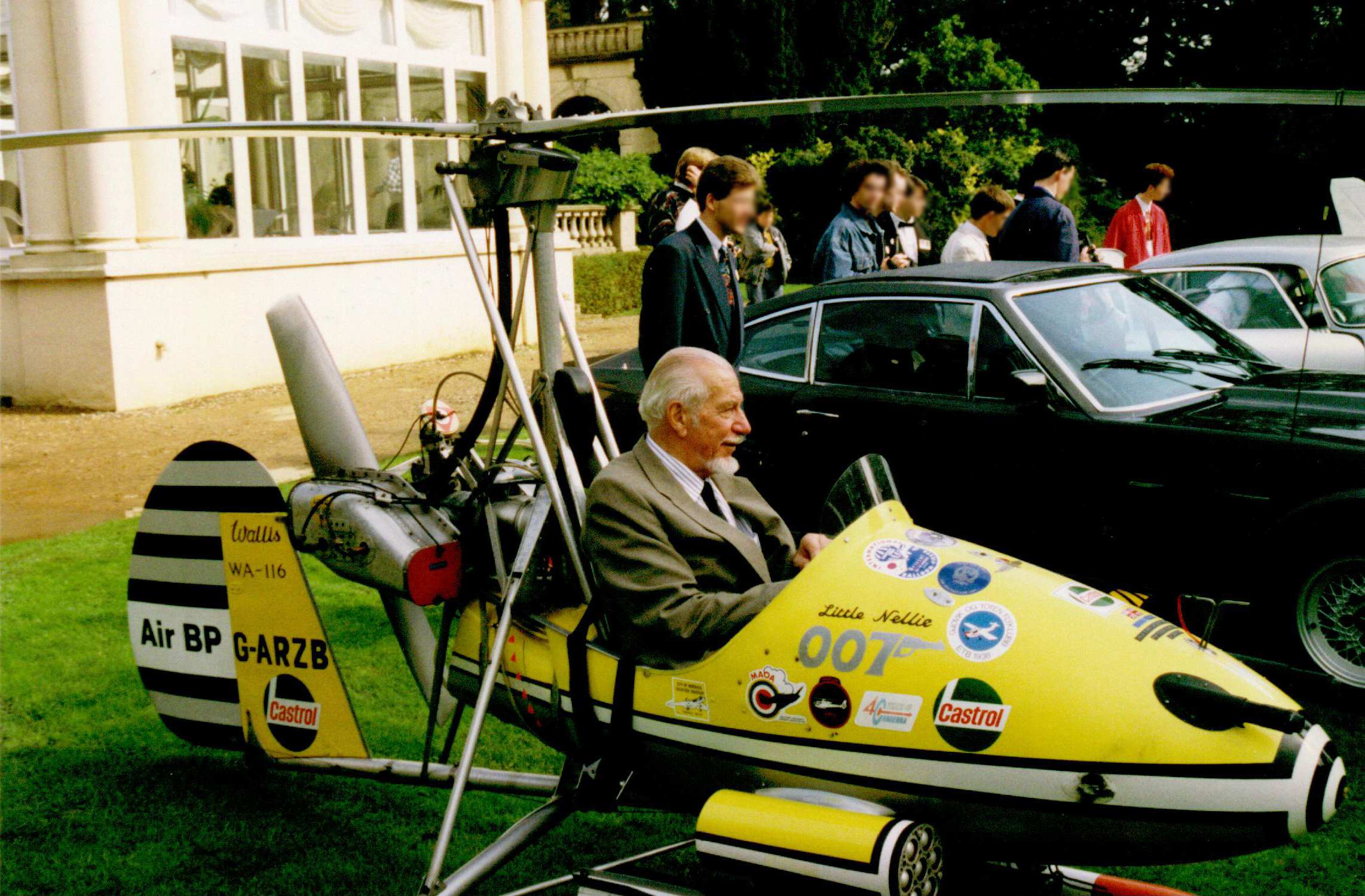
Ken Wallis in an autogyro

- 1 September – Ken Wallis, 97, autogyro exponent and James Bond stunt pilot.
- 2 September
  - Terry Clawson, 73, rugby league player.
  - Ronald Coase, 102, economist, Nobel Prize in Economics (1991).
  - David Jacobs, 87, radio and television broadcaster (Juke Box Jury, Any Questions?).
  - Olga Lowe, 93, stage and film actress.
  - Hugh van Cutsem, 72, landowner and horsebreeder.
  - Dame Juliet Wheldon, 63, civil servant.
- 3 September
  - Donald Featherstone, 95, wargamer.
  - Lewis Morley, 88, photographer (Christine Keeler, Joe Orton).
  - Brian Smith, 57, footballer (Bolton Wanderers F.C.).
- 4 September – Joe Warham, 93, rugby league coach (Leeds).
- 5 September – Geoffrey Goodman, 91, journalist and trade unionist.
- 6 September
  - Barbara Hicks, 89, actress (Brazil, Howards End).
  - Sir Cameron Rusby, 87, Royal Navy admiral.
  - Bill Wallis, 76, character actor.
- 7 September
  - Barney Hayhoe, Baron Hayhoe, 88, politician, MP for Heston and Isleworth (1970–1974) and Brentford and Isleworth (1974–1992).
  - Ted Loden, 73, army colonel.
- 9 September – Susan Fitzgerald, 64, actress (Angela's Ashes).
- 10 September
  - Richard Grey, 6th Earl Grey, 74, peer and businessman.
  - Barry Hancock, 74, footballer (Port Vale).
- 11 September – Tom Vernon, 74, writer and broadcaster (Fat Man series).
- 12 September – Joan Regan, 85, traditional pop singer.
- 13 September – Peter Aston, 74, composer and conductor.
- 14 September – Sir John Curtiss, 88, Royal Air Force officer.
- 15 September
  - Joyce Jacobs, 91, actress (A Country Practice).
  - Jackie Lomax, 69, guitarist and singer-songwriter.
  - Peter Morley, 84, football chairman (Crystal Palace F.C.).
- 16 September – George Hockham, 74, electrical engineer.
- 17 September – Peter Kay, 52, charity founder (Sporting Chance Clinic). (death announced on this date)
- 18 September – Lindsay Cooper, 62, rock and jazz musician (Henry Cow, Comus, Feminist Improvising Group).
- 19 September
  - Robert Barnard, 76, crime writer and critic.
  - Brian Furniss, 78, cricket player (Derbyshire).
  - Patrick Kay, 92, Royal Marines general.
- 20 September
  - George Bryan, 92, businessman, founder of Drayton Manor Theme Park.
  - Robert W. Ford, 90, diplomat and radio operator.
- 22 September – Kenneth Eager, 84, sculptor.
- 23 September
  - Harry Goodwin, 89, photographer.
  - Annette Kerr, 93, actress.
  - Trevor Lummis, 83, social historian.
- 24 September
  - Clive Akerman, 73, philatelist.
  - Anthony Lawrence, 101, journalist.
- 25 September – Ron Fenton, 72, football player and coach (Nottingham Forest).
- 26 September
  - Don Donovan, 83, football player and manager (Grimsby Town, Everton, Boston United).
  - Ellis Evans, 83, Celtic scholar.
- 27 September
  - Jock Kane, 92, intelligence officer.
  - Albert Naughton, 84, rugby league player (Widnes, Warrington).
- 28 September – Michael Sullivan, 96, art historian.
- 29 September
  - Hugh de Wardener, 97, medical doctor.
  - Robert Leeson, 85, children's author.
  - Charles McKean, 67, architectural historian.
- 30 September
  - John Flanagan, Scottish footballer (Partick Thistle).
  - John Hopkins, 86, conductor and music administrator.
  - Anthony Hinds, 91, screenwriter and producer.

=== October ===
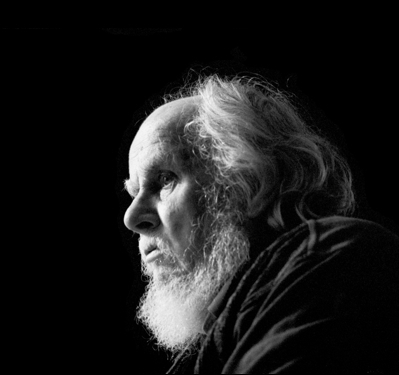
Ron Davies

- 1 October – Peter Broadbent, 80, footballer.
- 3 October
  - Edwin Haslam, 81, chemist.
  - Ernie Morgan, 86, footballer (Gillingham).
  - Joan Thirsk, 91, economic and social historian.
- 4 October – John Cloudsley-Thompson, 92, naturalist and army officer.
- 5 October
  - Charles Castle, 74, television producer and author.
  - Hugh Jackson, 95, paediatrician and child safety campaigner.
- 6 October
  - Paul Rogers, 96, actor.
  - Andy Stewart, 76, politician, MP for Sherwood (1983–1992).
- 7 October – Mick Buckley, 59, footballer (Everton, Sunderland).
- 8 October
  - David Clark, 94, cricket player and administrator.
  - Stan Paterson, 89, glaciologist.
  - Akong Rinpoche, 73, Buddhist teacher (Kagyu Samyé Ling Monastery and Tibetan Centre).
- 9 October
  - Robert Hugh Molesworth Kindersley, 3rd Baron Kindersley, 84, aristocrat and businessman.
  - Jillian Lane, 52, celebrity psychic.
  - Harold Rudman, 88, footballer (Burnley, Rochdale).
  - Monica Turner, 88, ornithologist.
- 10 October – Norrie Martin, 74, footballer (Rangers).
- 13 October – Tommy Whittle, 87, jazz saxophonist.
- 15 October
  - Ian Douglas-Wilson, 101, physician and editor (The Lancet).
  - Nevill Drury, 66, author and publisher.
  - Sean Edwards, 26, racing driver.
  - Jack Lynn, 86, architect.
- 16 October – Charles Halton, 81, mathematician and civil servant.
- 17 October – Terry Fogerty, 69, rugby league player.
- 18 October
  - Felix Dexter, 52, comedian (The Real McCoy).
  - Charlie Dickson, 79, footballer (Dunfermline Athletic).
  - Norman Geras, 70, political theorist and author, emeritus professor of politics (University of Manchester).
  - Michael Harvey, 82, lettering artist.
- 19 October
  - Noel Harrison, 79, singer ("The Windmills of Your Mind"), actor and Olympic skier.
  - Geoff Smith, 85, footballer (Bradford City).
- 21 October
  - Jackie Rea, 92, snooker player.
  - Tony Summers, 89, Olympic swimmer (1948).
- 23 October
  - Sir Anthony Caro, 89, sculptor.
  - Gypie Mayo, 62, rock guitarist (Dr. Feelgood, The Yardbirds) and songwriter ("Milk and Alcohol").
- 24 October
  - Antonia Bird, 62, television drama and film director.
  - Henry Taylor, 80, racing driver.
- 25 October
  - Nigel Davenport, 85, actor (Chariots of Fire, Howards' Way).
  - Roy Grantham, 86, trade unionist, General Secretary of APEX (1971–1989).
  - Sir Nicholas Hunt, 82, Royal Navy admiral.
- 26 October
  - Ron Davies, 91, photographer.
  - Michael Neuberger, 59, biochemist.
- 27 October – Sir Michael Wilkes, 73, army general, Lieutenant Governor of Jersey (1995–2001).
- 29 October – Graham Stark, 91, comedian and actor (The Pink Panther, Superman III, Alfie).
- 30 October
  - Pete Haycock, 62, guitarist (Climax Blues Band).
  - Dave MacFarlane, 46, footballer (Rangers, Kilmarnock).
  - Ray Mielczarek, 67, footballer (Wrexham).
- 31 October
  - Trevor Kletz, 91, chemical engineer and safety consultant.
  - William Morris, 88, Church of Scotland minister.
  - Charles Suckling, 93, biochemist.

=== November ===
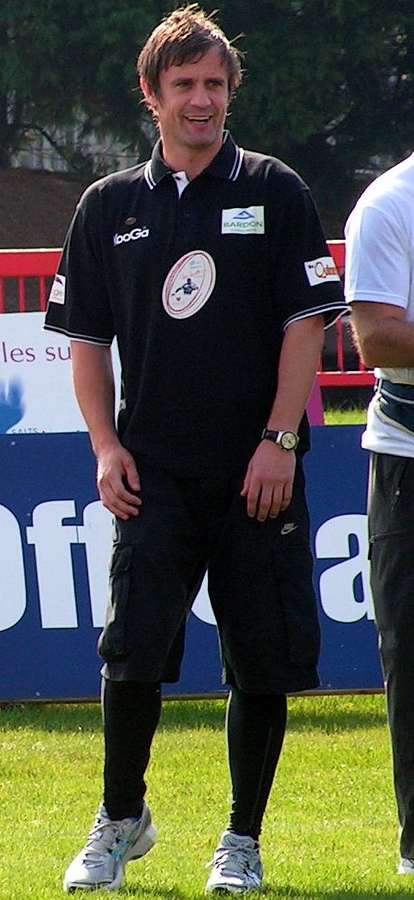
Steve Prescott

- 2 November
  - Jack Alexander, 77, Scottish entertainer and comedian.
  - Hugh Gurling, 63, geneticist.
- 3 November
  - Andro Linklater, 68, writer and historian.
  - Austin John Marshall, 76, record producer and artist.
  - Bernard Roberts, 80, classical pianist.
- 4 November
  - Roger Barton, 67, footballer.
  - Elfed Morris, 71, footballer (Chester City).
- 5 November
  - Tony Iveson, 94, Royal Air Force pilot and World War II veteran.
  - Charles Mosley, 65, genealogist.
  - Stuart Williams, 83, international footballer.
- 6 November – Sammy Taylor, 80, footballer.
- 7 November
  - John Cole, 85, Northern-Ireland born journalist and broadcaster
  - Ron Dellow, 99, football player and manager.
  - Mary Eyre, 89, hockey and tennis player.
- 8 November
  - Kris Ife, 67, pop singer
  - Sir John Whitehead, 90, diplomat, Ambassador to Japan (1986–1992).
- 9 November
  - Helen Eadie, 66, politician, MSP for Dunfermline East (1999–2011); Cowdenbeath (since 2011)
  - Steve Prescott, 39, rugby league player.
- 10 November – Sir Humphrey Maud, 79, diplomat.
- 11 November
  - Anne Barton (Shakespearean scholar), 80, Shakespearean scholar.
  - Eddie McGrady, 78, Northern Irish politician, MP for South Down (1987–2010).
- 12 November
  - Mavis Batey, 92, World War II codebreaker.
  - Hetty Bower, 108, political activist.
  - Sir John Tavener, 69, composer of religious music
- 14 November
  - Georgina Anderson, 15, singer, liver cancer.
  - Peter Frank, 79, academic and media commentator on Russian affairs.
  - Jim McCluskey, 63, football referee.
  - Olivia Robertson, 96, religious leader, high priestess of the Fellowship of Isis.
- 15 November – Andrew Best Semple, 101, medical officer.
- 16 November
  - Robin Plunket, 8th Baron Plunket, 87, peer.
  - William Ward, 4th Earl of Dudley, 93, peer.
  - Jock Young, 71, criminologist.
- 17 November
  - Sir Alfred Blake, 98, Royal Marines officer and solicitor, Director of the Duke of Edinburgh's Award Scheme (1967–1978).
  - Doris Lessing, 94, Nobel Prize-winning writer.
  - Gerald Spring Rice, 6th Baron Monteagle of Brandon, 87, peer and businessman.
- 18 November – Sir Jock Kennedy, 85, air marshal.
- 19 November
  - Ray Gosling, 74, broadcaster and gay rights activist.
  - John Ingamells, 79, art historian.
  - Frederick Sanger, 95, biochemist, laureate of Nobel Prize in Chemistry (1958, 1980).
- 20 November
  - Bruce Bilby, 91, mechanical engineer.
  - Peter Griffiths, 85, politician, MP for Smethwick (1964–1966) and Portsmouth North (1979–1997).
  - Cyril Townsend, 75, politician, MP for Bexleyheath (1974–1997).
- 21 November – Cyril Perkins, 102, cricketer.
- 22 November – Brian Dawson, 74, folk singer and song collector.
- 24 November – Robin Leigh-Pemberton, Baron Kingsdown, 86, peer and banker, Governor of the Bank of England (1983–1993).
- 25 November
  - Bob Day, 72, pop singer (The Allisons).
  - Bill Foulkes, 81, footballer (Manchester United F.C., England).
  - Joel Lane, 50, author.
  - John Shaw, 56, radio broadcaster.
- 26 November
  - John Galbraith Graham, 92, crossword compiler ("Araucaria" of The Guardian) and Church of England priest.
  - Stan Stennett, 88, comic entertainer, actor and jazz musician.
  - William Stevenson, 89, author and academic.
- 27 November
  - Lewis Collins, 67, actor (The Professionals).
  - Reg Simpson, 93, Test cricketer.
- 29 November
  - Chris Howland, 85, radio and television presenter.
  - Douglas Samuel Jones, 91, mathematician.
- 30 November
  - Vera Houghton, 99, health campaigner.
  - Jean Kent, 92, actress (The Browning Version)
  - Georgina Somerset, 90, dentist and Royal Navy officer.

=== December ===
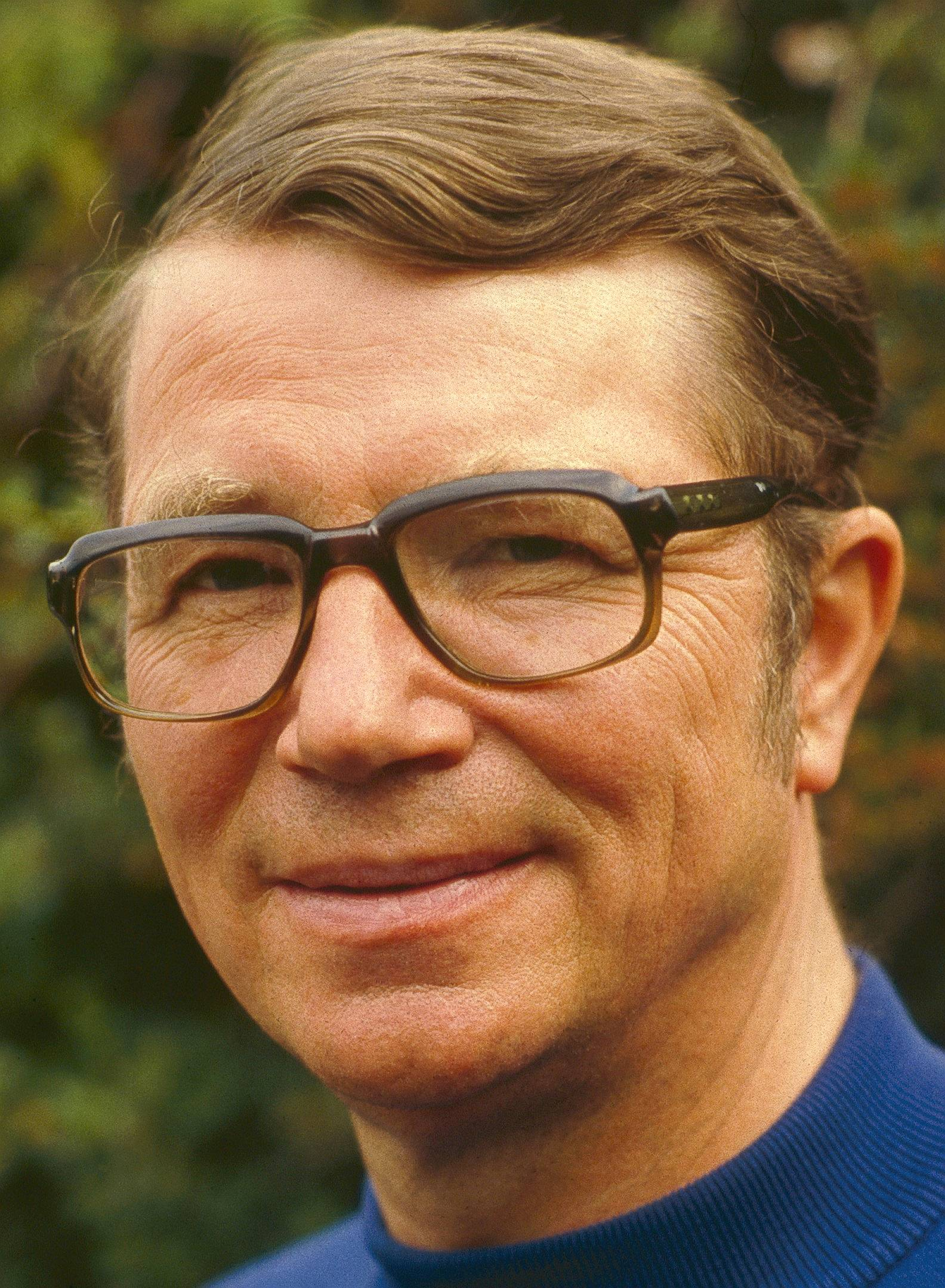
Writer Colin Wilson in 1984

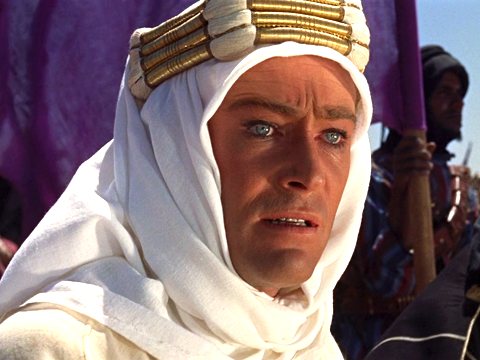
Peter O'Toole

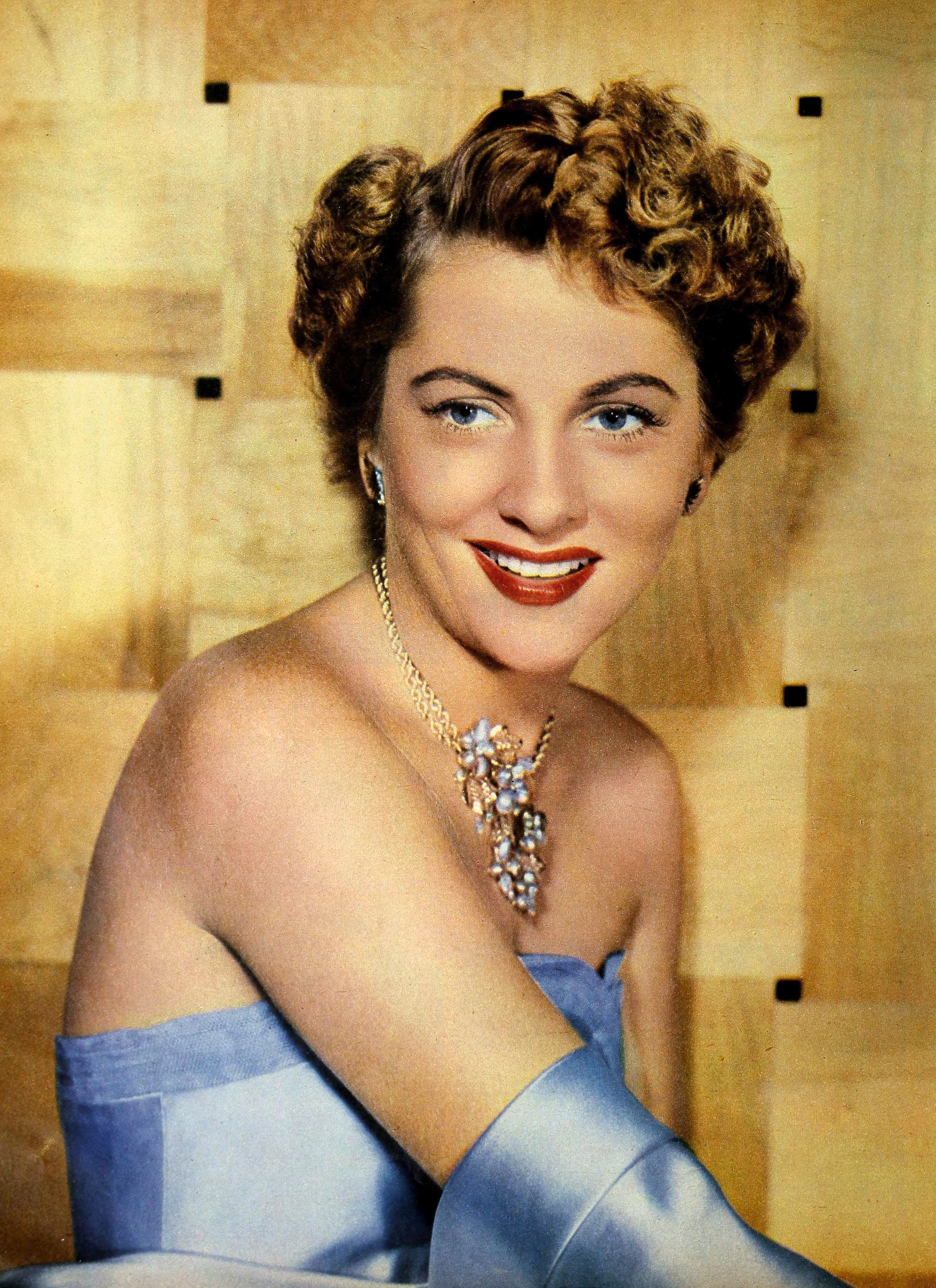
Joan Fontaine in 1951

- 1 December
  - Maurice Cockrill, 78, artist.
  - Richard Coughlan, 66, drummer (Caravan).
- 2 December
  - John Ewbank, 64, rockclimber.
  - Brian Hitchen, 77, journalist, Editor of the Daily Star (1987–1994) and Sunday Express (1994–1995).
  - Mary Riggans, 78, actress (Take the High Road, Balamory, Dear Frankie).
- 3 December
  - John Albery, 77, chemist and academic, Master of University College, Oxford (1989–1997).
  - Ida Pollock, 105, romance novelist.
- 4 December
  - McDonald Bailey, 92, Olympic sprinter (1948), bronze medalist (1952).
  - Henry Cubitt, 4th Baron Ashcombe, 89, peer.
  - Charles Grigg, 97, comic strip artist (Korky the Cat, Desperate Dan).
- 5 December
  - Monte Fresco, 77, sports photographer.
  - Barry Jackson, 75, actor (Doctor Who, Wimbledon, Midsomer Murders).
  - Colin Wilson, 82, writer.
- 6 December – Stan Tracey, 86, jazz pianist.
- 7 December – Alan Bridges, 86, film and television director (The Shooting Party).
- 8 December
  - Sir John Cornforth, 96, chemist, laureate of the Nobel Prize (1975).
  - Edward Williams, 92, composer (Life on Earth).
- 9 December
  - Dame Florence Baron, 61, High Court judge.
  - Norman Harding, 84, trade unionist and political activist.
  - Lynne Kieran, 53, singer (The Rounder Girls).
- 10 December
  - Alan Coleman, 76, television director and producer (The Young Doctors, Neighbours).
  - Skeets Gallacher, 88, boxer.
- 11 December
  - Kate Barry, 46, fashion photographer.
  - Frederick Fox, 82, milliner.
  - Patrick Kavanagh, 90, police officer, Deputy Commissioner of Police of the Metropolis (1977–1983).
- 12 December
  - Molly Allott, 95, WRAF officer.
  - Bernard Conlan, 90, politician, MP for Gateshead East (1964–1987).
  - David Jones, 73, footballer (Millwall).
  - Maria Lidka, 99, violinist.
  - Rae Woodland, 91, soprano.
- 13 December – Wyn Roberts, Baron Roberts of Conwy, 83, politician, MP for Conwy (1970–1997).
- 14 December
  - G. W. S. Barrow, 89, historian.
  - Peter O'Toole, 81, actor (Lawrence of Arabia, The Lion in Winter, Troy).
- 15 December
  - Joan Fontaine, 96, Oscar-winning actress (Rebecca, Suspicion).
  - Dennis Lindley, 90, British statistician.
- 16 December – James Flint, 100, Royal Air Force officer.
- 17 December
  - Alfred Bates, 69, politician, MP for Bebington and Ellesmere Port (1974–1979).
  - Richard Britnell, 69, historian.
- 18 December
  - Ronnie Biggs, 84, criminal (Great Train Robbery) and fugitive.
  - Paul Torday, 67, author.
- 19 December
  - Winton Dean, 97, musicologist.
  - Leon Kuhn, 59, political cartoonist.
- 20 December – David Richards, 57, record producer.
- 21 December
  - David Coleman, 87, sports commentator and presenter.
  - Peter Geach, 97, philosopher.
- 23 December – Addison Cresswell, 53, comedy agent and manager.
- 24 December
  - Eric Auld, 82, artist.
  - Sir Michael Butler, 86, diplomat, Permanent Representative to the E.U. (1979–1985).
  - R. A. Foakes, 90, author and Shakespearean scholar.
  - Stuart Jakeman, 60, cricket player (Northants).
  - Allan McKeown, 67, film producer (Tracey Takes On...).
  - Ron Noades, 76, football chairman (Crystal Palace).
  - R.A. Shooter, 97, microbiologist.
- 25 December
  - David R. Harris, 83, geographer, anthropologist and archaeologist.
  - Wayne Harrison, 46, footballer.
- 26 December
  - Andy Malcolm, 80, footballer (West Ham United).
  - Sally Vincent, 76, journalist.
- 27 December – Peter John Harding, 73, Royal Air Force officer, Defence Services Secretary (1994–1998).
- 28 December
  - Alexander Lamb Cullen, 93, electrical engineer.
  - Robert Boscawen, 90, politician, MP for Wells (1970–1983), Somerton and Frome (1983–1992).
- 29 December
  - Paul Comstive, 52, footballer.
  - Mary Wibberley, 79, novelist.
- 30 December
  - Gerald Mortimer, 77, author and sports journalist (Derby Telegraph).
  - Geoffrey Wheeler, 83, broadcaster (Songs of Praise, Top of the Form, Winner Takes All).
- 31 December – John Fortune, 74, comedian (Bremner, Bird and Fortune).

== See also ==
- 2013 in British music
- 2013 in British television
- 2013 in England
- 2013 in Northern Ireland
- 2013 in Scotland
- 2013 in Wales
- List of British films of 2013
