= Paul McKeever =

Paul McKeever may refer to:

- Paul McKeever (politician), leader of the Freedom Party of Ontario
- Paul McKeever (police officer), British police officer
