= John Trim =

John Trim may refer to:

- John Trim (cricketer)
- John Trim (linguist)
