= Junior Heffernan =

Irish triathlete and cyclist

Junior Heffernan (11 August 1989 – 3 March 2013) was an Irish triathlete and then cyclist who at the end of his life was competing mostly in Great Britain. He attended Kelly College on the outskirts of Tavistock, Devon, where he competed under coach Rich Brady.

Heffernan represented Ireland in international competitions both at the World and European championship levels in triathlon from 2007 until 2009 when a hip injury sent him in the direction of cycling. Prior to his setback he was widely considered to have been Ireland's most promising triathlete. As a cyclist Heffernan competed for the Herbalife Leisure Lakes Team. Heffernan was fatally injured in a collision during the Severn Bridge Road Race near Olveston in Gloucestershire, England. He was 23.
