= Ian Douglas-Wilson =

- Born: 12 May 1912; Harrogate, Yorkshire, England
- Died: 15 October 2013 (aged 101)
- Education: University of Edinburgh
- Occupations: Physician and editor
- Known for: Editor of The Lancet
- Military career
- Allegiance: United Kingdom
- Branch: British Army
- Service years: 1940–1955
- Rank: Captain
- Service number: 127729

Ian Douglas-Wilson (12 May 1912 – 15 October 2013) was a British physician who was editor of The Lancet, a United Kingdom-based medical journal, from 1965 to 1976.

== Early life ==
Douglas-Wilson was born on 12 May 1912 in Harrogate, Yorkshire, England. He was educated at Marlborough College, a private school in Marlborough, Wiltshire. He studied medicine at the University of Edinburgh. He graduated in 1936, and completed a Doctor of Medicine (M.D.) degree in 1938.

== Career ==
Douglas-Wilson began his medical career in Dublin, Ireland helping to deliver newborns. This was followed by work in Pembrokeshire, Wales as a general practitioner.

On 3 April 1940, he commissioned into the Royal Army Medical Corps, British Army as a lieutenant. He was given the service number 127729. He took part in the Normandy Landings in June 1944. His experience treating shell-shocked soldiers in the following months, lead to the publication of an article exploring the impact of war and conflict on mental health. This made him one of the first to have work published in this field of expertise. He was one of the first allied medical professionals to reach the Bergen-Belsen concentration camp, following its liberation in April 1945. He later told his family he felt guilty because the first troops to arrive fed the famished prisoners high-calorie rations. Many died because they were unused to food. He returned to England with photographs of the camp that he would keep in his desk drawer as a reminder.

Following the end of World War II, he attended an interview at the British Medical Journal. This led the then editor Hugh Clegg to offer him a job. Being 'too radical for their publication', he refused and it was suggested that he try The Lancet. In 1946, he was given the position of assistant editor. This was the beginning a 30-year career with the medical journal. In 1952, he was promoted to Deputy Editor. He served as editor from 1965 to 1976.

He retired on 30 June 1976.

== Later life ==
Douglas-Wilson died of heart failure on 15 October 2013 in London, England. He was aged 101.

== Personal life ==
Douglas-Wilson and his wife had three children; a son, David, and two daughters, Elizabeth and Joanna. He was a supporter of Campaign for Nuclear Disarmament. He attended one of the first Aldermaston marches with his then teenage son.
