= Jim Watson (English politician) =

British pastor (1917–2013)

The Reverend Jim Watson (c. 1917 – 4 January 2013) was a British politician and former minister of the Audley Range United Reformed Church from 1958 to 1982. Watson served as a Labour councillor for St Thomas's ward, now known as Queen's Park, in Blackburn, Lancashire from 1964 until 1997. He also held office as the Mayor of Blackburn from 1982 to 1983.

Watson died at Royal Blackburn Teaching Hospital on 4 January 2013, at the age of 95.
