= Murder of Una Crown =

2013 murder in Wisbech, England

Coordinates: 52°39′37.2″N 00°08′43.2″E

Una Crown
- Born: 1926; England
- Died: 13 January 2013 (aged 86); Wisbech, England
- Cause of death: Murder by stabbing

Una Crown (1926 – 13 January 2013) was an 86-year-old woman who was murdered in her home in Wisbech in Cambridgeshire, England, in 2013. Her death was initially treated as unsuspicious, but a post-mortem concluded that she had died from stab wounds to her neck and chest. At least one suspect was arrested but no individuals were charged. The brutality of the case and admission of police failure in the murder investigation brought national attention to the case. On 13 February 2025, David Newton was found guilty of her murder.

== Background ==
Una Crown was a retired postmistress who lived alone on the outskirts of Wisbech. Her husband, Jack Roland "Ron" Crown, died in 2009; they had no children. She rarely had visitors, and was described as "very security-conscious", regularly locking her house when she was there.

== Murder investigation ==
Crown was last seen on 11 January 2013, and spoke to a friend on the telephone at 5 pm on 12 January. On 13 January, she was found dead in the hallway of her bungalow in Magazine Lane, Wisbech, by her nephew-in-law John Payne. She was found surrounded by blood and burned newspaper; her body had been burned but the fire had not spread to the rest of the house and had self-extinguished. Crown had been robbed of her wedding ring, front door key, and £40, and her clothing had been burned, apparently to destroy evidence. A singed tea towel was found on a radiator near a charred wall.

Two attending police officers concluded the death was not suspicious, as they had thought she had accidentally set herself on fire via the stove, which she tried to put out with a tea towel, and had then died from a heart attack. The police investigation concluded that two cuts to her throat had most likely been torn by pressure from the scarf as her body fell to the floor. A post-mortem on 15 January, however, found that Crown had been stabbed to death and a murder investigation was launched. Because of the police's initial conclusion, Crown's house had not been treated as a murder investigation crime scene, and evidence including a key had been washed.

Crown's funeral was held at King's Lynn Crematorium on 25 February 2013. In April 2013, a reconstruction and appeal was made by Crimewatch.

On 17 June 2014, two men were arrested in connection with her death but were released without charge. In March 2023, a reward of up to £20,000 was offered by Crimestoppers for any information leading to a conviction. The same month the case was featured again on Crimewatch.

== Review of police behaviour ==
A review found that "flawed decisions" were made by police when they failed to realise they were dealing with a murder scene. The two officers first on the scene were found to have "breached the standards of professional behaviour". The coroner condemned the "bungling" of the investigation. The blood and handprints on the floor and walls was not initially noticed by investigators.

Three finger nail clippings taken from Mrs Crown were collected and kept in a sealed evidence bag but had gone missing in the years since the murder. It was on these nail clippings that DNA matching David Newton were found.

== Charges and conviction ==
In 2023, a "DNA breakthrough" linked David Newton to the crime. Newton had been arrested on suspicion of murder in 2013, but released without charge. Newton lived in the area and regularly walked his dog past her home. He fixed her bungalow lock in Spring 2012. At 8.30pm on the evening of the murder he had been seen by a local resident walking drunkenly in the vicinity of Mrs Crown’s home.

Newton was charged with murder in April 2024, and found guilty in February 2025. After the guilty verdict, Detective Superintendent Iain Moor from Cambridgeshire Police said: "mistakes were made during the initial investigation in 2013, for which we have apologised to Una's family".

== Eliza Bibby ==
On 10 January 2023, ten years after Crown's murder, the body of 47-year-old Eliza Bibby was found at her bungalow in Wisbech. As she had been stabbed in the neck, similarities between Bibby's and Crown's murders were drawn.

In October 2023, 47-year-old Jamie Boughen was found guilty of the murder of Eliza Bibby. He was sentenced to life with a minimum term of 22 years.
