= Hugh Gurling =

- Born: Hugh Malcolm Douglas Gurling; 6 May 1950; London, United Kingdom
- Died: 2 November 2013 (aged 63)
- Occupation: Scientist

Hugh Malcolm Douglas Gurling (6 May 1950 – 2 November 2013) was an English medical geneticist who specialised in the role of genetics and mental health. He led a molecular psychiatry laboratory at University College, London.

Gurling was born in London on 6 May 1950, and brought up in Derbyshire. His father, Kenneth Gurling, was a physician and inaugural dean of the University of Nottingham. His mother, Nonie Sempill, was a nurse.

In 1987, he married Meryl Dahlitz, an academic neuropsychiatrist. In 1994 they had their first daughter Holly, and then twins Laurel and Alisdair in 1998.

== Death ==
Gurling died of a heart attack on 2 November 2013.
