= Derek Leaver (footballer) =

English footballer

Derek Leaver (13 November 1930 – 24 March 2013) was an English footballer who played as an inside forward.

Leaver played for Blackburn Rovers, AFC Bournemouth and Crewe Alexandra.

He signed for Mossley from Macclesfield Town in the 1957–58 season, making seven appearances.
