= Gerald Mortimer =

English author and sports journalist (1937–2013)

- Born: 1937
- Died: 30 December 2013 (aged 77)
- Occupations: Author, sports journalist
- Years active: 1970–2013

Gerald Mortimer (1937 – 30 December 2013) was an English author and sports journalist, whose career spanned over four decades.

Mortimer began his career in July 1970, as a sports journalist for the Derby Telegraph (then Derby Evening Telegraph), a job which he held until his death in December 2013.

Gerald Mortimer died following declining health on the night of 30 December 2013, aged 77.
