= Nick Broad =

British sports nutritionist

Nick Broad (died 19 January 2013) was an English football nutritionist.

== Biography ==
Broad graduated from Aberdeen University.

was football nutritionist who worked for some of Britain's biggest football clubs including Blackburn Rovers, Birmingham City, Chelsea Football Club and in Paris, he worked for Paris St-Germain. Broad was a close friend of former Chelsea manager, Carlo Ancelotti.

He died on 19 January 2013 of an accidental traffic collision, aged 38.
