= Jenny Lay =

British local politician

Lord Mayor of Norwich
- In office 17 May 2011 – 2012
- Preceded by: Tom Dylan
- Succeeded by: Ralph Gayton

Personal details
- Born: Jennifer Pescot Worthing, Sussex
- Died: July 14, 2013

Jennifer Susan "Jenny" Lay (née Pescot; 1937 – 14 July 2013) was a British local politician in Norwich. She was Lord Mayor of Norwich for 2011–12.

Lay was born in Worthing, Sussex. Growing up in Portsmouth, England, she trained as a nurse. After marrying her husband, Kenneth Lay, in the 1960s, they had to move around the country, due to his job as a prison officer. In 1980, they arrived in Norwich, loved the area, and decided to never leave. She soon became a member of its city council representing the Labour Party and, in 1998, its Sheriff. In 2009, she was diagnosed with breast cancer and had to undergo a double mastectomy. In 2011, she was appointed Lord Mayor of Norwich. In late 2012, the cancer returned and, her health failing, she was forced to step down from the mayorship and city council.

Lay had two children, a daughter and son. She died of cancer on 14 July 2013 at the age of 74.
