= Richard Orton =

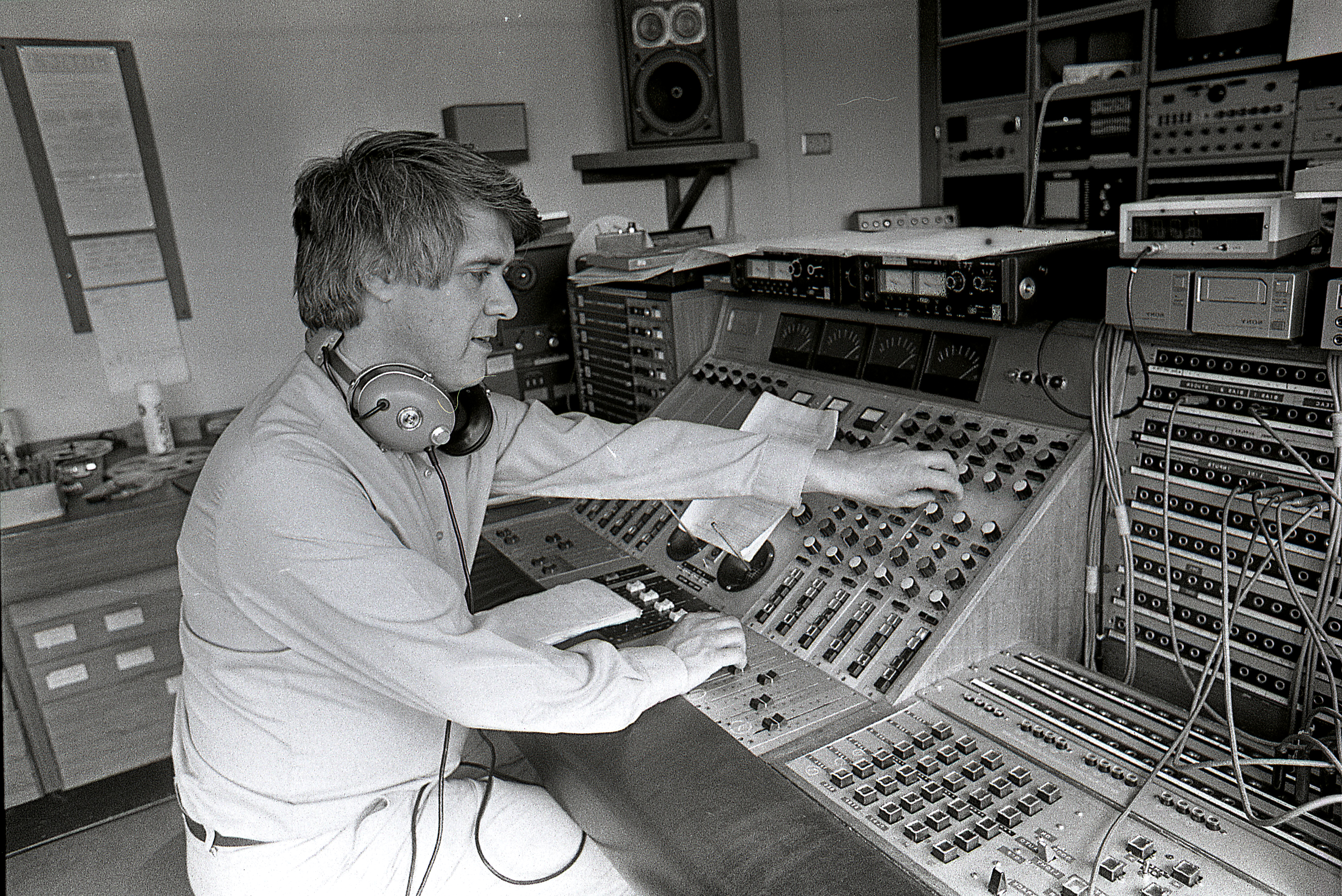
Richard Orton in his studio at the University of York, 1984

Richard Orton (1940–2013) was a composer, performer and music educator.

In 1968 he co-founded the electronic music ensemble Gentle Fire along with Hugh Davies.

Orton worked at the Department of Music at the University of York from 1967 to 1996. He established the University's Electronic Music Studio (EMS) in 1968, the first in a university in the North of England. The studio began as a ‘classical’ tape studio, but later adopted the technologies of the voltage-controlled synthesizer and digital systems. He proposed the Project teaching system which is still the basis of teaching at York and which has been emulated by many University Music departments around the world. He established the Mediamix series of concerts, which combined performances of electro-acoustic compositions with film, dance and other performance media. He was a co-founder of the Composers Desktop Project, which placed affordable sound technologies on the individual composer's desk, and developed musical composition software, which formed part of the CDP system. In the early 1980s, with his colleague Dr. Ross Kirk from the Department of Electronics at York, he started work on the concept of Music Technology as an academic discipline. This led to the establishment of the world's first postgraduate course in Music Technology in 1986.

In 1992 he began working on his algorithmic composition language, Tabula Vigilans, designed for real-time performance.

On taking early retirement from the University of York in 1996, he was honoured by the University with a lifetime Emeritus Readership.

During his lifetime, he wrote a considerable amount of music. As well as this, he contributed teaching materials to the Open University in its early days and wrote "Electronic Music for Schools", published in 1981.
