= Trevor Lummis =

English writer & historian (1930-2013)

Trevor Lummis (25 August 1930 – 23 September 2013) was an English writer and historian. He was Honorary Treasurer of the Oral History Society and held an Honorary Fellowship in the Department of Sociology at the University of Essex.

== Early occupation and education ==
He spent ten years as an Able Seaman in the Merchant Navy, before resuming studies as a mature student at the New Battle Abbey College; he subsequently graduated from the University of Edinburgh, University of London and University of Essex. He specialised in 19th and 20th century social and oral history.

Drew University listed Lummis among their faculty in 2011.

== Personal life ==
He was married to Sandra from 1971 until his death.

== Consultancy for television documentary ==
Lummis was a historical consultant to The Bounty Hunters, a television documentary on the work of a team from James Cook University, Queensland, which was diving on the wreck of HMS Bounty and doing other archeological work on Pitcairn Island. It was transmitted in March 1999 on Channel 4, British Television.

== Research and teaching experience ==
At the University of Essex his research work was in social history through oral history methods. After working as research assistant on Family Life and Work Experience before 1918, he was senior research officer on The Family and Community Life of East Anglian Fishermen (Social Science Research Council grant HR 2656/1), which focused in particular on the working environment and its effect on industrial and community relations.

He subsequently worked on The Systematic Analysis of Life Histories (Social Science Research Council grant HR 7841), which coded oral interviews for computer archiving and analysis. All projects were directed by Paul Thompson, and Lummis was the sole researcher on the two numbered projects. He is a past Honorary Treasurer of the Oral History Society and held an Honorary Fellowship in the Department of Sociology at Essex.

During the above period he taught on the Social History courses both at undergraduate and graduate level. He also worked as a tutor-counsellor for the Open University Social Science Course. Other teaching was with the London Programme of Drew University, USA.

== Bibliography ==
=== Books ===
- Pacific Paradises: The Discovery of Tahiti and Hawaii, Sutton Publishing, Stroud. 2005.
- Pitcairn Island: Life and Death in Eden, Ashgate, London. 1997.
- Re-issued as:
  - Life and Death in Eden:Pitcairn Island and the Bounty mutineers. Victor Gollancz, London. 1999.
  - Life and Death in Eden:Pitcairn Island and the Bounty mutineers. Orion Books, Phoenix Paperback, London. 2000.
- Life and Death in Eden: Pitcairn Island and the Bounty mutineers. Victor Gollancz. London. 1999.
- Life and Death in Eden: Pitcairn Island and the Bounty mutineers. Orion Books, Phoenix Paperback. London. 2000.
- and in translation.
  - Italian. L’Ultimo uomo del Bounty. Piemme. 2000.
  - Dutch. Leven en dood in het paradijs. Uitgeverij Atlas. 2001.
- The Labour Aristocracy 1851-1914. Scholar Press. 1994.
- The Woman's Domain. Co-author Jan Marsh. Viking/National Trust. 1990.
- Listening to History: the authenticity of oral evidence, Hutchinson. 1987; also Barnes and Noble Books. New Jersey. USA, 1988.
- Occupation and Society: the East Anglian fishermen 1880-1914, Cambridge University Press. 1985.
- Living the Fishing. With Paul Thompson and Tony Wailey. Routledge and Kegan Paul. 1983.

== Articles and essays. ==
- Structure and Validity in Oral Evidence, The Oral History Reader (eds) Robert Perks and Alistair Thomson, Routledge. 1998
- Oral History Reprinted in Folklore, Cultural Performances, and Popular Entertainments, Richard Bauman (ed.), Oxford University Press, 1992.
- Oral History, International Encyclopaedia of Communications, Erik Barnouw (ed.), Oxford University Press, 1986.
- Contributor to the Open University's East Anglian Studies Resource Pack, and presenter of the Oral History Cassette which is part of it. 1984
- The Historical Dimension of Fatherhood: a case study 1890-1914, in L. McKee and M. O'Brien (eds), The Father Figure, Tavistock, 1982
- Structure and Validity in Oral Evidence, International Journal of Oral History, June, 1981, U.S.A.
- The Class Perceptions of East Anglian Fishermen: an historical dimension through oral evidence, British Journal of Sociology, March, 1979
- Historical Data and the Social Sciences, Open University Cassettes, D301.06 to D301.11, 1974.
- Charles Booth: Social Scientist or Moralist?, Economic History Review, February, 1971.

== Distinctions ==
1982-86 Honorary Treasurer of the Oral History Society. 1984-86 Honorary Fellow of the Department of Sociology, University of Essex.
