= Ian Fowler =

British journalist (1939–2013)

Ian Fowler (28 June 1939 – 15 February 2013) was a British journalist, who worked for the Manchester Evening News. He came to prominence as a result of becoming the first person to link the deaths of the four child victims in the Moors Murders case.

Fowler died from Parkinson's disease on 15 February 2013, at the age of 73. He was diagnosed with the disease at the age of 49.
