= David Mills (cricketer) =

English cricketer (1937–2013)

Personal information
- Full name: David Cecil Mills
- Born: 23 April 1937; Camborne, Cornwall, England
- Died: 16 March 2013 (aged 75); London, England
- Batting: Right-handed
- Bowling: Right-arm medium

Domestic team information
- Years: Team
- 1960: Free Foresters
- 1958: Gloucestershire

Career statistics
Competition	First-class
Matches	2
Runs scored	19
Batting average	9.50
100s/50s	–/–
Top score	17
Balls bowled	48
Wickets	–
Bowling average	–
5 wickets in innings	–
10 wickets in match	–
Best bowling	–
Catches/stumpings	1/–
- Source: Cricinfo, 30 July 2011

David Cecil Mills (23 April 1937 – 16 March 2013) was an English cricketer. Mills was a right-handed batsman who bowled right-arm medium pace. He was born in Camborne, Cornwall and educated at Clifton College, where he represented the college cricket team.

Mills made his only first-class appearance for Gloucestershire against Cambridge University in 1958. In his match, he scored 17 runs, before being dismissed by Michael James, in what was his only batting innings for the county. He later made a further first-class appearance in 1960, this time for the Free Foresters against Cambridge University. In this match, he once again batted once, scoring 2 runs before being dismissed by David Kirby.

Mills studied mechanical engineering at Emmanuel College, Cambridge and would go on to invent a non-slip plastic called Dycem which is used worldwide as a disability aid.
