= Andrew Doughty =

English anaesthetist (1916–2013)

Andrew Gerald Doughty (2 September 1916, Lincoln – 2 June 2013) was an English anaesthetist.

In 1957, he invented the Doughty gag, a modification of the Boyle-Davis gag for anaesthesia during adenotonsillectomy. It has a split blade, which allows use of an endotracheal tube and is in universal use to this day. He was an early promoter of the use of epidural anaesthesia during childbirth. In 1973, he set up an epidural course at Kingston Hospital. This two-week-long, one-on-one training course drew attendees from all over the world, and places had to be booked years in advance.

He was born in 1916 in Lincoln and qualified from St Thomas's Hospital in 1941. In retirement Doughty lived in Thames Ditton.
