= John Trim (linguist) =

British linguist (1924–2013)

John Leslie Melville Trim (1924 – 19 January 2013), Director of the Council of Europe's Modern Languages projects from 1971 to 1997, was a key promoter of the Common European Framework of Reference for Languages.

After graduating from University College, London (UCL) in 1949, he remained there lecturing before moving to Selwyn College, Cambridge as University Lecturer in Phonetics in 1958. As well as setting up the Department of Linguistics at Cambridge in 1966, Trim was also president of the British Association for Applied Linguistics (BAAL) and vice-president of the International Association of Applied Linguistics (AILA).

The Language Centre at University of Cambridge named its independent learning centre, the John Trim Centre (JTC), after him.
