= Paul McKeever (police officer) =

Paul John McKeever (11 January 1956 – 17 January 2013) was a British police officer. He was born in Germany and was educated at Shaftesbury School, Dorset and read geography at London University. He joined the Metropolitan Police in 1977 and led the Police Federation of England and Wales from 2008 until his death. He died of a suspected embolism aged 57 and is survived by his wife Charmian and their daughter.

In April 2014 the Metropolitan Police Federation announced that a scholarship for a Master of Science in Research Degree at Canterbury Christ Church University would be launched in his name.
