= Deaths in March 2013 =

The following is a list of notable deaths in March 2013.

Entries for each day are listed alphabetically by surname. A typical entry lists information in the following sequence:

- Name, age, country of citizenship and reason for notability, established cause of death, reference.

== March 2013 ==
=== 1 ===
- Jewel Akens, 79, American R&B singer ("The Birds and the Bees"), complications from back surgery.
- Janez Albreht, 87, Slovenian actor.
- Campbell Armstrong, 69, Scottish author.
- Chris Canavan, 84, British actor (Coronation Street).
- W. Gene Corley, 77, American consulting engineer.
- Helga Cranston, 91, German film editor.
- Robert Danhof, 87, American judge, member (1969–1992) and Chief Judge (1976–1992) of the Michigan Court of Appeals.
- Bonnie Franklin, 69, American actress (One Day at a Time, The Young and the Restless, Please Don't Eat the Daisies), pancreatic cancer.
- Mukesh Gadhvi, 50, Indian politician, MP for Banaskantha, complications from a stroke.
- Sammy Guillen, 88, Trinidadian-born New Zealand cricketer, represented both countries.
- D. V. J. Harischandra, 74, Sri Lankan psychiatrist and Buddhist scholar, complications from a heart attack.
- Dorothy Howard, 84, Canadian mezzo-soprano, opera director, and voice teacher
- Margaret Johansen, 89, Norwegian novelist.
- Gaynelle Griffin Jones, 64, American lawyer and judge, US Attorney for the Southern District of Texas, member of the Texas Court of Appeals, cancer.
- Pat Keen, 79, English actress (Fawlty Towers, Shadowlands).
- Naw Kham, 43, Burmese drug lord, execution by lethal injection.
- Magic, 37, American rap vocalist (Sky's the Limit), traffic collision.
- Ric Menello, 60, American writer (Two Lovers), music video director ((You Gotta) Fight for Your Right (To Party!)), heart attack.
- John Paul Miller, 94, American goldsmith.
- Trevor Morley, 79, English cricketer.
- Erich Pennekamp, 83, German Olympic water polo player.
- Rafael Puyana, 81, Colombian harpsichordist.
- Sir Alan Smith, 95, British World War II Spitfire fighter ace.
- Ken Stanley, 91, English table tennis player.
- Gabriel Vanel, 88, French Roman Catholic prelate, Archbishop of Auch (1985–1996).
- Ludwig Zausinger, 84, German footballer.

=== 2 ===
- Phillip Bonosky, 96, American novelist and journalist.
- Tom Borland, 80, American baseball player (Boston Red Sox), MVP of the College World Series (1955).
- Francesca Forrellad, 85, Spanish writer, aneurysm.
- Peter Harvey, 68, Australian television journalist (Nine Network), pancreatic cancer.
- William F. Hyland, 89, American politician and lawyer, New Jersey Attorney General (1974–1978).
- Jimmy Jackson, 81, Scottish footballer (Notts County).
- Eriya Kategaya, 67, Ugandan politician, Deputy Prime Minister and Minister for East African Affairs.
- Giorgos Kolokithas, 67, Greek basketball player, cardiac arrest.
- Thomas McEvilley, 73, American art critic and academic, complications from cancer.
- Master O'Reilly, 10, New Zealand-bred Australian racehorse, winner of Caulfield Cup (2007).
- Bryce Rope, 90, New Zealand All Blacks rugby union coach (1983–1984).
- Hans Schnitger, 97, Dutch Olympic bronze-medalist field hockey player (1936).
- Shabnam Shakeel, 70, Pakistani poet and author.
- Bjørn Skau, 84, Norwegian politician, Minister of Justice and the Police (1981).
- Zdeněk Švestka, 87, Czech astronomer.
- Jorge Vago, 85, Argentine Olympic sailor.

=== 3 ===
- Zora Kramer Brown, 63, American breast cancer awareness advocate, ovarian cancer.
- Luis Cubilla, 72, Uruguayan footballer (River Plate, Nacional), stomach cancer.
- Rik De Saedeleer, 89, Belgian football player (KV Mechelen) and journalist.
- Johann Eekhoff, 71, German economist.
- Col Firmin, 72, Australian politician.
- Jaime Guadalupe González Domínguez, 38, Mexican journalist, shot.
- Plamen Goranov, 36, Bulgarian rights activist, self-immolation.
- Müslüm Gürses, 59, Turkish singer and actor, complications from heart surgery.
- Johnny Hanks, 78, New Zealand boxer.
- Junior Heffernan, 23, Irish triathlete and racing cyclist, race collision.
- Gerald D. Klee, 86, American psychiatrist and LSD expert, involved in hallucinogenic drug research for US Army, complications following surgery.
- Manfred Kremser, 62, Austrian ethnologist.
- Danie G. Krige, 93, South African mining engineer and geologist.
- Richard Matthews, 60, South African Emmy- and BAFTA Award-winning wildlife filmmaker (BBC Natural History Unit), plane crash.
- Bobby Rogers, 73, American soul singer and songwriter (The Miracles), complications from diabetes.
- José Sancho, 68, Spanish actor, lung cancer.
- Song Wenfei, 27, Chinese actress, uterine cancer.
- James Strong, 68, Australian businessman, CEO of Qantas (1993–2001), complications from lung surgery.
- George Wearring, 84, Canadian Olympic basketball player (1952).
- Donald W. Zacharias, 77, American academic, President of MSU (1985–1997).

=== 4 ===
- José Almandoz, 75, Spanish Olympic rower.
- Lillian Cahn, 89, American businesswoman, co-founder of Coach, Inc. and designer of the Coach handbag
- Bill Dankbaar, 60, Australian Olympic rower.
- Menachem Froman, 67, Israeli settler and chief rabbi, colorectal cancer.
- Dic Goodman, 93, Welsh poet.
- Harry Greene, 89, Welsh actor and television personality, creator of Changing Rooms and DIY SOS.
- Chick Halbert, 94, American basketball player.
- Seki Matsunaga, 84, Japanese footballer.
- Mickey Moore, 98, Canadian-born American actor and director, heart failure.
- Maurus Nekaro, 57, Namibian politician, Governor of Kavango Region (since 2010), hypertension.
- Tom Pennington, 73, American football player (Georgia Bulldogs, Dallas Texans).
- George Petherbridge, 85, English footballer (Bristol Rovers).
- Jérôme Savary, 70, Argentine-born French theater director and actor, cancer.
- Hobart Muir Smith, 100, American herpetologist.
- Toren Smith, 52, Canadian manga publisher and translator.
- Fran Warren, 87, American singer ("Sunday Kind of Love") and actress (Abbott and Costello Meet Captain Kidd).

=== 5 ===
- Paul Bearer, 58, American professional wrestling manager (WWF), upper respiratory infection.
- Hugo Chávez, 58, Venezuelan politician and military officer, President (since 1999), heart attack.
- Stephen Citron, 89, American composer and biographer.
- Nigel Forbes, 22nd Lord Forbes, 95, Scottish soldier, businessman and politician, Minister of State for Scotland (1958–1959).
- Calvin Fowler, 73, American Olympic gold medallist basketball player (1968).
- Charles Galbreath, 87, American politician and judge, member of the Tennessee House (1960–1968) and Court of Appeals (1968–1978), pneumonia.
- Duane Gish, 92, American creationist.
- Gorō Naya, 83, Japanese voice actor (Lupin III, Kamen Rider, Space Battleship Yamato), chronic respiratory failure.
- Dawn Clark Netsch, 86, American politician, member of the Illinois State Senate (1972–1990), Illinois Comptroller (1991–1995), amyotrophic lateral sclerosis.
- Dieter Pfaff, 65, German actor, lung cancer.
- Rajasulochana, 77, Indian actress and dancer, renal failure.
- Robert Relyea, 82, American film producer (West Side Story, Bullitt), natural causes.
- Melvin Rhyne, 76, American jazz organist.
- Hikmat al-Shihabi, 82, Syrian military leader.
- Tommy Smith, 75, American jockey.
- Arthur Storch, 87, American theatrical director and actor, founder of Syracuse Stage.
- Luc Wallays, 51, Belgian cyclist, cancer.
- Tove Wallenstrøm, 98, Danish actress.
- Bill Walters, 69, American politician, member of the Arkansas Senate (1982–2000), pancreatic cancer.

=== 6 ===
- Maciej Berbeka, 58, Polish mountaineer, climbing accident.
- Dave Bewley, 92, English footballer (Watford).
- Sabine Bischoff, 54, German Olympic champion fencer (1984).
- Chorão, 42, Brazilian singer-songwriter (Charlie Brown Jr.), skateboarder and screenwriter, cocaine overdose.
- Ahmed Zaman Chowdhury, 65, Bangladeshi film journalist, screenwriter and lyricist, road accident.
- W. Wallace Cleland, 83, American biochemist.
- Stompin' Tom Connors, 77, Canadian country-folk singer ("The Hockey Song", "Bud the Spud"), kidney failure.
- Ward de Ravet, 88, Belgian actor.
- Keld Helmer-Petersen, 92, Danish art photographer.
- Takashi Iwashige, 58, Japanese manga artist.
- Abdul Jalil, 74, Bangladeshi politician, MP for Naogaon District.
- Sir Norman King, 79, British vice admiral and naval secretary.
- Alvin Lee, 68, British guitarist (Ten Years After), complications from surgery.
- Carlo Lotti, 96, Italian engineer.
- Jack Marshall, 86, Australian rugby player.
- Paddy McIlvenny, 88, Northern Irish footballer.
- Andrei Panin, 50, Russian actor.
- John Spence, 83, Saint Vincent-born Trinidadian politician and botanist, member of the Trinidad Senate (1987–2000), heart attack.
- Roland Trebicka, 65, Albanian actor, lung cancer.
- Bernarda Vásquez Méndez, 95, Costa Rican suffragist, first country's female to vote.
- Mike Walker, 101, American engineer.

=== 7 ===
- Kenny Ball, 82, English jazz trumpeter, pneumonia.
- Peter Banks, 65, English rock guitarist (Yes), heart failure.
- Cleto Bellucci, 91, Italian Roman Catholic prelate, Archbishop of Fermo (1976–1997).
- Ruth Booker-Bryant, 89, American human rights activist.
- John J. Byrne, 81, American insurance executive, Chairman of White Mountains Insurance Group (GEICO, Overstock.com), cancer.
- Sybil Christopher, 83, Welsh actress.
- Dirk Coetzee, 67, South African paramilitary commander (Vlakplaas), kidney failure.
- Didier Comès, 70, Belgian comedic artist.
- Beatriz Consuelo, 80, Brazilian-born Swiss ballerina and dance instructor.
- Damiano Damiani, 90, Italian film director (Amityville II: The Possession).
- Max Ferguson, 89, British-born Canadian radio broadcaster, heart attack.
- Barbara Goldschmidt, 91, Israeli painter.
- Dick Graham, 90, British football manager (Colchester United F.C.), heart condition.
- Harold Hunter, 86, American basketball coach (Tennessee State University), first African-American to sign NBA contract.
- Frederick B. Karl, 88, American judge and politician, member of Florida House of Representatives (1956–1964), Senate (1968–1972) and Florida Supreme Court (1976–1978).
- Stan Keery, 81, English footballer (Crewe Alexandra).
- Claude King, 90, American country music singer ("Wolverton Mountain").
- Freda Linde, 97, South African children's writer and translator.
- Ray Martin, 87, American baseball player (Boston Braves).
- Willie McCulloch, 85, Scottish footballer.
- Els Noordhof, 89, Dutch artist.
- Ali Al Numairy, 55, Emirati plastic surgeon, traffic accident.
- Alfred Post, 86, German Olympic footballer (1952).
- Pao Sarasin, 83, Thai politician, Deputy Prime Minister (1992), Interior Minister (1992), blood infection.
- Jeffrey Skitch, 85, British opera singer and educator.
- Jake Striker, 79, American baseball player (Cleveland Indians, Chicago White Sox).
- Willy Switkes, 83, American character actor (Tootsie), colon cancer.
- Elmar Tampõld, 92, Estonian-born Canadian architect.
- Carl Thomas, 80, American baseball player (Cleveland Indians).
- Jacques Torczyner, 98, Belgian political leader, President of the ZOA (1968–1973).
- Jan Zwartkruis, 87, Dutch football coach (national team).

=== 8 ===
- Haseeb Ahsan, 73, Pakistani cricketer.
- Rolando Bojórquez Gutiérrez, 45, Mexican politician.
- Hartmut Briesenick, 63, German Olympic bronze medallist shot put athlete (1972).
- Hardin Cox, 85, American politician, member of the Missouri House of Representatives (1965–1975) and Missouri Senate (1975–1983).
- Ricardo da Force, 45, English dance vocalist (The KLF, N-Trance), brain hemorrhage.
- Toby Graham, 92, British Olympic (1956) cross-country skier and university professor.
- Hakob Hakobian, 89, Armenian artist, heart attack.
- Carlos Jáuregui, 80, Chilean–Canadian chess master.
- Ewald-Heinrich von Kleist-Schmenzin, 90, German Army officer and publisher, last surviving member of the 20 July plot.
- Jürg Marmet, 85, Swiss mountaineer, third person to summit Mount Everest (1956).
- Enda Marren, 78, Irish lawyer.
- Sammy Masters, 82, American rockabilly musician.
- Tony Maxworthy, 79, British-American physicist.
- John O'Connell, 86, Irish politician, TD for Dublin South-West (1965–1993), Minister for Health (1992–1993) and MEP for European Parliament (1979–1981).
- Kai Pahlman, 77, Finnish footballer.
- George Saimes, 71, American football player (Buffalo Bills, Denver Broncos), leukemia.
- Rudolf Schiffl, 71, German Olympic archer.
- Ludwig Schulze, Papua New Guinean politician.
- Charles Thurstan Shaw, 98, British archaeologist.
- Raymond Telles, 97, American politician and diplomat, Mayor of El Paso (1957–1961), Ambassador to Costa Rica (1961–1967).
- Ian Wilson, 80, Irish cricketer.
- Ginny Wood, 95, American environmentalist, founder of the Alaska Conservation Society.

=== 9 ===
- Aasia, 60, Pakistani film actress.
- Tengiz Amirejibi, 85, Georgian pianist.
- Angelo J. Arculeo, 89, American politician.
- Dave Bland, 83, Australian rules footballer.
- Geoff Braybrooke, 77, British-born New Zealand politician, MP for Napier (1981–2002).
- David Farmbrough, 83, British Anglican prelate, Bishop of Bedford (1981–1993).
- David Handley, 81, British Olympic cyclist (1960).
- Max Jakobson, 89, Finnish diplomat and journalist.
- Larry Martin, 69, American paleontologist, cancer.
- Richard McIver, 71, American politician.
- Paul Nassau, 83, American composer and lyricist.
- Neneco Norton, 89, Paraguayan musician, composer and orchestra director.
- Viren J. Shah, 86, Indian politician and industrialist, Governor of West Bengal (1999–2004), heart attack.
- A. R. Shaw, 91, American politician, member of the North Dakota House of Representatives.
- Merton Simpson, 84, American artist, gallery owner and African art collector, complications from stroke, diabetes and dementia.

=== 10 ===
- Larisa Avdeyeva, 87, Russian mezzo-soprano.
- Edelmiro Amante, 79, Filipino politician, member of the House of Representatives (1987–1995, 2001–2004, 2007–2010), liver cancer.
- Jim Anderson, 82, Canadian ice hockey player (Springfield Indians) and coach (Washington Capitals).
- Brian Archer, 83, Australian politician, Senator for Tasmania (1975–1994).
- Hugh Casey, 85, Northern Irish politician.
- John Chick, 80, Australian football player (Carlton).
- Robert Chrisman, 75, American poet, activist and editor (The Black Scholar), complications from heart failure.
- Stanley Crowther, 87, British politician, MP for Rotherham (1976–1992).
- Maurice Delarue, 93, French journalist.
- Jacques Dupont, 91, French film director (Trapped by Fear).
- Emilio Eiroa, 77, Spanish politician, President of the Government of Aragon (1991–1993).
- Wolf Gorelik, 80, Russian conductor.
- František Gregor, 74, Czech Olympic ice hockey player.
- Princess Lilian, Duchess of Halland, 97, Welsh-born Swedish royal.
- Tony Mansfield, 73, Irish hurling player and manager.
- Antal Megyerdi, 73, Hungarian Olympic cyclist.
- Ian Munro Ross, 85, British engineer and scientist, President of Bell Labs (1979–1991), pneumonia.
- Frank Ruddle, 83, American cell and developmental biologist.
- Metin Serezli, 79, Turkish actor, lung cancer.
- Adalin Wichman, 91, American sculptor, designer of the Eclipse Award Trophy.
- Masao Yamaguchi, 81, Japanese anthropologist, pneumonia.
- Asa G. Yancey Sr., 96, American physician and academic.
- Danny Zialcita, 72, Filipino filmmaker, stroke.

=== 11 ===
- Erica Andrews, 43, Mexican drag performer, Miss Continental (2004), lung ailment.
- Helga Arendt, 48, German Olympic sprinter (1988).
- Martin Adolf Bormann, 82, German theologian.
- Ignatius Anthony Catanello, 74, American Roman Catholic prelate, Auxiliary Bishop of Brooklyn (1994–2010).
- Doug Christie, 66, Canadian lawyer and free speech activist, leader of the Western Block Party (since 2005), liver cancer.
- Simón Alberto Consalvi, 85, Venezuelan politician and author, Minister of Foreign Affairs (1977–1979; 1985–1988), Minister of Interior and Justice (1988–1989).
- Tony Gubba, 69, British journalist and sports commentator, leukaemia.
- Raymond Kirsch, 71, Luxembourgish businessman and politician, President of the Council of State (2000–2001).
- Lisa Lynch, 33, British journalist, breast cancer.
- Maya Ray, 86, Indian politician, kidney failure.
- Mitchell Melton, 69, American politician, member of the Pennsylvania House of Representatives (1969–1972), prostate cancer.
- Ramankutty Nair, 87, Indian Kathakali maestro, recipient of the Padma Bhushan.
- Robert Pecanka, 82, Austrian Olympic hockey player.
- Jacquelin Perry, 94, American orthopedic surgeon, known for her treatment of polio.
- Sripada Pinakapani, 99, Indian musician.
- Florian Siwicki, 88, Polish military officer and politician, Minister of Military Affairs (1981–1990).
- Boris Vasilyev, 88, Russian writer.

=== 12 ===
- John Boncore, 61, American political activist, fall.
- George Burditt, 90, American politician and lawyer.
- Clive Burr, 56, British drummer (Iron Maiden), complications from multiple sclerosis.
- Robert Castel, 79, French sociologist.
- Stanley Cole, 89, American architect (EwingCole), designed Citizens Bank Park, pneumonia.
- Michael Grigsby, 76, British documentary film maker.
- John Holloway, 70, Australian public servant and diplomat, skin cancer and diabetes.
- Kazzia, 13, German-foaled Irish thoroughbred horse, post-foaling complications. (death announced on this date)
- Teresa Mattei, 92, Italian freedom fighter and politician, last female member of the Constituent Assembly, proposed mimosa as symbol of IWD.
- George A. Norris, 84, Canadian artist and sculptor.
- Gordon Pembery, 86, Welsh footballer.
- Ray Perez, 74, American Olympic boxer.
- Ganesh Pyne, 76, Indian painter, cardiac arrest.

=== 13 ===
- José Guadalupe Cervantes Corona, 88, Mexican politician, Governor of Zacatecas (1980–1986).
- Philip Crosfield, 88, Scottish Anglican priest.
- Richard Davey, 74, Australian actor and playwright.
- Léon Deladerrière, 85, French football player and coach.
- Deke DeLoach, 92, American FBI agent and author.
- Ducky Detweiler, 94, American baseball player (Boston Braves).
- Werner Hofmann, 84, Austrian art historian, cultural journalist, writer, curator and museum director, heart attack.
- Sir Tore Lokoloko, 82, Papua New Guinean politician, Governor-General (1977–1983).
- Jack Marston, 64, English rugby league player, cancer.
- Delia Meulenkamp, 77, Dutch-born American Olympic swimmer (1952).
- Veer Bhadra Mishra, 74, Indian mahant and environmentalist, Time magazine "Hero of the Planet" (1999), lung infection.
- Hans Moretti, 84, German illusionist and escapologist.
- Gerard Sithunywa Ndlovu, 74, South African Roman Catholic prelate, Bishop of Umzimkulu (1986–1994).
- Nelson Ne'e, 59, Solomon Islands politician, MP for Central Honiara (2006–2010).
- Perween Rahman, 56, Pakistani activist, director of the Orangi Pilot Project, homicide.
- Rolf Schult, 85, German voice actor.
- Władysław Stachurski, 67, Polish football player and manager (Legia Warsaw, national team).
- Malachi Throne, 84, American actor (It Takes a Thief, Star Trek, Catch Me If You Can), lung cancer.
- Siegfried Weiß, 79, German Olympic skier.
- Paul H. Wendler, 96, American politician.

=== 14 ===
- William Sheridan Allen, 80, American historian.
- Jim Barrett, 86, American wine pioneer and vineyard owner (Chateau Montelena).
- Henry Besant, 40, English mixologist and businessman, heart attack.
- Edward Bland, 86, American filmmaker and composer (The Cry of Jazz).
- Walt Buck, 82, Canadian politician, Alberta MLA for Clover Bar (1967–1989), stomach cancer.
- Stanford Cazier, 82, American educator, president of California State University, Chico (1971–1979) and Utah State University (1979–1992).
- Norman Collier, 87, British comedian, Parkinson's disease.
- Jack Curran, 82, American high school sports coach, complications from cancer and kidney failure.
- Jack Greene, 83, American country music singer ("Statue of a Fool", "There Goes My Everything"), complications from Alzheimer's disease.
- Subas Herrero, 69, Filipino comedian, respiratory failure.
- Mirja Hietamies, 82, Finnish Olympic medal-winning (1952, 1956) cross-country skier.
- Scott Kennedy, 47, American comedian.
- John Konstantinos, 76, American football coach and administrator.
- H. Coleman McGehee Jr., 89, American Episcopalian prelate, Bishop of Michigan (1973–1990).
- François Narmon, 79, Belgian businessman and sports administrator.
- Thomas Rhoad Jr., 89, American politician, member of the South Carolina House of Representatives (1983–2007).
- Paul Rose, 69, Canadian political figure, leader of PDS (1996–2002), convicted kidnapper and murderer (October Crisis), stroke.
- Aramais Sahakyan, 76, Armenian writer and politician.
- Ieng Sary, 87, Vietnamese-born Cambodian politician, co-founder of the Khmer Rouge.
- George Sossenko, 94, Russian military veteran (Spanish Civil War).
- Harry Thomson, 72, Scottish footballer (Burnley F.C.), throat cancer.
- Camilo Vives, 71, Cuban film producer (Lucía, Fresa y Chocolate).

=== 15 ===
- P. Balasubramaniam, 53, Malaysian private investigator, alleged government conspiracy in the murder of Shaariibuugiin Altantuyaa, heart attack.
- James Bonk, 82, American chemistry professor.
- Bernard Cheese, 88, British painter and printmaker.
- Docs Keepin Time, 25–26, American Quarter Horse.
- Booth Gardner, 76, American politician, Governor of Washington (1985–1993), Parkinson's disease.
- Hardrock Gunter, 88, American musician, complications of pneumonia.
- Shannon Larratt, 39, Canadian editor and publisher (BMEzine).
- Terry Lightfoot, 77, British jazz clarinettist.
- Leverne McDonnell, 49, Australian actress (The Saddle Club, Phoenix), cancer.
- Masamichi Noro, 78, Japanese aikidoka, founded Kinomichi.
- Kallam Anji Reddy, 71, Indian chemical engineer and pharmaceutical executive, founder of Dr. Reddy's Laboratories, liver cancer.
- Dante Rossi, 76, Italian Olympic water polo player.
- Jack Stevens, 83, Australian footballer.
- Marcel van Cleemput, 86, French-born British toy designer.
- Peter Worsley, 88, British sociologist.
- Felipe Zetter, 89, Mexican footballer (Club Atlas, national team).

=== 16 ===
- Trond Brænne, 59, Norwegian actor and author, stroke.
- Larcenia Bullard, 65, American politician, member of the Florida House of Representatives (1992–2000) and Senate (2002–2012).
- Leslie Gooday, 91, British architect.
- Jamal Nazrul Islam, 74, Bangladeshi mathematical physicist and cosmologist, diabetes and heart disease.
- Kong Ngai, 77, Chinese film and television actor (The Greed of Man), lung cancer.
- Luchaa Mohamed Lamin, 60, Saharawi politician and diplomat, lung cancer.
- Elizabeth Lindsay, 100, American track and field athlete.
- José Alfredo Martínez de Hoz, 87, Argentine economist, Minister of Economy (1976–1981).
- John Marvel, 86, American politician, member of the Nevada Assembly (1979–2005), lung disease.
- David Mills, 75, English cricketer.
- Jason Molina, 39, American singer-songwriter, multiple organ failure.
- Yadier Pedroso, 26, Cuban baseball player, traffic collision.
- Sol Rabinowitz, 88, American recording industry executive (Baton Records).
- Michael Roarty, 84, American brewing advertising executive (Anheuser-Busch), created "This Bud's for you" slogan.
- Ruchoma Shain, 98, American-born teacher and author.
- Bobby Smith, 76, American singer (The Spinners), complications from influenza and pneumonia.
- Marina Solodkin, 60, Russian-born Israeli politician, Member of Knesset (1996–2013), stroke.
- Jae Spears, 90, American politician, member of the West Virginia House of Delegates (1974–1980) and West Virginia Senate (1980–1992).
- Frank Thornton, 92, British actor (Are You Being Served?, Last of the Summer Wine, Gosford Park).

=== 17 ===
- Blaster Al Ackerman, 73, American writer and artist.
- Rudolf Battěk, 88, Czech sociologist, dissident and politician, recipient of the Order of Tomáš Garrigue Masaryk.
- Svein Blindheim, 96, Norwegian military officer, World War II resistance fighter and historian.
- William B. Caldwell III, 87, American military officer, Commander General for the Fifth Army.
- Grady Clay, 96, American journalist and landscape architect.
- Steve Davis, 60, American college football player (University of Oklahoma), plane crash.
- Rosine Delamare, 101, French costume designer (The Earrings of Madame de...).
- André Fontaine, 91, French historian and journalist.
- Lawrence Fuchs, 86, American academic.
- Mitchell Hooks, 89, American artist, illustrator, and movie poster artist (Dr. No, The Sand Pebbles, El Dorado).
- Jan van Houwelingen, 73, Dutch politician, State Secretary for Defence (1981–1989), Mayor of Haarlemmermeer (1994–2003).
- Jean-Noël Lavoie, 85, Canadian politician.
- John David Merwin, 91, American politician, Governor of the Virgin Islands (1958–1961).
- Olivier Metzner, 63, French criminal lawyer, apparent suicide by drowning.
- Akio Johnson Mutek, 55, South Sudanese Roman Catholic prelate, Bishop of Torit (since 2007), kidney failure.
- Umm Nidal, 63, Palestinian politician, multiple organ failure.
- Peter Scott, 82, British burglar.
- François Sermon, 89, Belgian footballer (R.S.C. Anderlecht).
- A.B.C. Whipple, 94, American journalist and author.

=== 18 ===
- Muhammad Mahmood Alam, 77, Pakistani military officer, General and flying ace (Indo-Pakistani War of 1965).
- Mindy Baha El Din, 54, Egyptian environmentalist, complications from a stroke.
- Henry Bromell, 65, American screenwriter and producer (Homeland, Chicago Hope, Northern Exposure), heart attack.
- Clay Ford, 74, American politician, member of the Florida House of Representatives (since 2007), cancer.
- Earl Hersh, 80, American baseball player (Milwaukee Braves).
- Ali İhsan Karayiğit, 85–86, Turkish football player.
- Muhammad Khan, 84, Pakistani Olympic boxer.
- Mary Ellen Rudin, 88, American mathematician.
- Robin Williams, 93, New Zealand mathematician, university administrator and civil servant, member of the Manhattan Project.

=== 19 ===
- Khalid Ahmad, 69, Pakistani poet and journalist, lung cancer.
- Ryan Birch, 43, British judoka, traffic collision.
- Tom Clements, 58, American civil servant, head of the Colorado Department of Corrections (since 2011), shot.
- Desmond Drummer, 72, South African cricketer.
- Eyvind Fjeld Halvorsen, 90, Norwegian academic.
- Holger Juul Hansen, 88, Danish actor.
- Lester Lewis, 46, American television writer and producer (The Office, Caroline in the City, The PJs), suicide.
- Valentino Macchi, 75, Italian actor.
- Lori March, 90, American television actress.
- Sir Fergus Montgomery, 85, British politician, MP for Newcastle upon Tyne East (1959–1964), Brierley Hill (1967–1974), and Altrincham and Sale (1974–1997).
- Seijin Noborikawa, 80, Japanese folk musician.
- Bud Palmer, 91, American sportscaster and basketball player (New York Knicks), cancer.
- David Parland, 42, Swedish musician (Dark Funeral), suicide.
- Irina Petrescu, 71, Romanian actress, cancer.
- Harry Reems, 65, American porn actor (Deep Throat), pancreatic cancer.
- Adeline Smith, 95, American Lower Elwha Klallam Tribe elder, developed the Klallam language alphabet and first dictionary.

=== 20 ===
- George Barrow, 91, American jazz saxophonist.
- Eddie Bond, 79, American rockabilly singer, complications from Alzheimer's disease.
- Rena Golden, 51, Indian-born American journalist (CNN, The Weather Channel), lymphoma.
- James Herbert, 69, English horror writer (The Rats).
- Vasile Ianul, 67, Romanian football player and executive, Chairman of Dinamo Bucharest (1985–1994), cardiac arrest.
- Robert W. Johnson, 88, American politician, member of the Minnesota House of Representatives (1963–1975).
- George Lowe, 89, New Zealand-born British mountaineer, explorer and film director, last participant of the 1953 British Mount Everest Expedition.
- Vijay A. Madgavkar, 98, Indian badminton player.
- Antonio Manganelli, 62, Italian police chief, head of Polizia di Stato (since 2007), complications of cancer.
- Frederic Mayer, 81, American operatic tenor.
- Leslie Milnes, 90, New Zealand cricketer.
- Nicholas C. Petris, 90, American politician, member of the California State Assembly (1958–1966); State Senator (1966–1996), Alzheimer's disease.
- Zillur Rahman, 84, Bangladeshi politician, President (since 2009).
- Jesse Rogers, 79, American baseball player (Kansas City Monarchs).
- Emílio Santiago, 66, Brazilian singer, complications from a stroke.
- Stefano Simoncelli, 66, Italian Olympic medal-winning (1976) fencer.
- Nasser El Sonbaty, 47, German professional bodybuilder.
- Risë Stevens, 99, American operatic mezzo-soprano.
- Jack Stokes, 92, English animation director (Yellow Submarine, Heavy Metal).
- Calvert Watkins, 80, American Indo-European linguist, Harvard professor and author.
- Jerry E. Wilkerson, 68, American politician, member of the Mississippi House of Representatives.

=== 21 ===
- Chinua Achebe, 82, Nigerian poet, professor and novelist (Things Fall Apart, Anthills of the Savannah).
- Terry Alderete, 67, American businesswoman, cardiac arrest.
- Joseph Blewett, 87, South African cricketer.
- Mohamed Said Ramadan Al-Bouti, 83, Turkish-born Syrian cleric, bombing.
- Angus Carmichael, 87, Scottish footballer.
- Ernest Chapman, 86, Australian Olympic rower.
- Jim Crowley, appr. 82, American football coach.
- Isagani Cruz, 88, Filipino judge, member of the Supreme Court (1986–1994).
- Yvan Ducharme, 75, Canadian humorist and actor, COPD.
- David Fisher, 66, English artist, cancer.
- Tyrone Gilks, 19, Australian motorcycle stunt rider, collision during practice.
- Rick Hautala, 64, American horror author, heart attack.
- Harlon Hill, 80, American football player (Chicago Bears), MVP (1955), Rookie of the Year (1954).
- Angelo Ingrassia, 89, American judge, member of the New York Supreme Court (1982–1999).
- Sir Ewan Jamieson, 82, New Zealand military officer, Chief of Air Force (1979–1983), Chief of Defence Force (1983–1986).
- Cornelis H. A. Koster, 69, Dutch computer scientist, traffic collision.
- Ludwig Leitner, 73, German Olympic (1964) alpine skier and world champion .
- Pietro Mennea, 60, Italian Olympic medal-winning (1972, 1980) sprinter and politician, cancer.
- Moondog Spike, 62, American wrestler.
- Robert Nichols, 88, American character actor (Giant).
- Jörgen Ohlin, 75, Swedish footballer (Malmö FF).
- Max Oldmeadow, 88, Australian politician, MP for Holt (1972–1975).
- Aníbal Paz, 95, Uruguayan footballer.
- Herschel Schacter, 95, American rabbi, natural causes.
- Joe Burt Scott, 92, American baseball player, stroke.
- Bruce Skeggs, 80, Australian politician and trotting commentator.
- Ken Wellman, 82, Australian ice hockey player.
- Giancarlo Zagni, 86, Italian director and screenwriter (La bellezza di Ippolita).

=== 22 ===
- John U. Bascom, 87, American surgeon.
- Vladimír Čech, 61, Czech actor, television presenter and politician, colorectal cancer and pneumonia.
- Leszek Gondek, 74, Polish historian.
- Bernard Green, 60, British priest and historian, heart attack.
- Fred Jones, 75, English football player (Hereford United, Brighton).
- Jimmy Lloyd, 73, English Olympic boxer, heart attack.
- James Nabrit III, 80, American civil rights lawyer, lung cancer.
- Thomas Qian Yurong, 99, Chinese Roman Catholic prelate, Bishop of Xuzhou, ex-communicated then reconciled (2007).
- Lee Scarpetti, 85, Italian-born American politician, member of the Connecticut Senate (1984–2000).
- Christa Speck, 70, German model, Playboy Playmate (September 1961), Playmate of the Year (1962), natural causes.
- Bebo Valdés, 94, Cuban pianist, bandleader, composer and arranger, Alzheimer's disease.
- Robert D. Warren Sr., 84, American politician, member of the West Virginia Senate (1980–1988).
- Derek Watkins, 68, British trumpeter, played on every James Bond soundtrack, cancer.
- Ray Williams, 58, American basketball player (New York Knicks), colon cancer.

=== 23 ===
- Sukhraj Aujla, 45, Indian folk singer, traffic collision.
- Boris Berezovsky, 67, Russian business oligarch, government official and mathematician, coroner's open verdict.
- David Bond, 90, British Olympic champion sailor (1948).
- Muhammad Chudori, 86, Indonesian journalist, co-founder of The Jakarta Post.
- Jean Crawford Cochrane, 98, Irish educator.
- Onofre Corpuz, 86, Filipino academic and politician, Secretary of Education (1967–1971, 1979–1984).
- David Early, 74, American actor (Dawn of the Dead, The Silence of the Lambs, Zack and Miri Make a Porno), cancer.
- Conrad Hyers, 79, American historian of religion.
- Rapama Kamehozu, 63, Namibian politician, Governor of Omaheke (since 2012), Governor of Otjozondjupa (2011–2012), cancer.
- Ruth A. Lucas, 92, first African American woman in the Air Force, cardiac arrest.
- Norman R. Palmer, 94, American film and television editor (The Shaggy D.A., Ten Who Dared), natural causes.
- Peter Sutton, 89, New Zealand Anglican clergyman, Bishop of Nelson (1965–1990).
- Chandramani Tripathi, 66, Indian politician.
- Virgil Trucks, 95, American baseball player (Detroit Tigers).
- Joe Weider, 93, Canadian publisher, co-founder of the International Federation of BodyBuilders, founder of Muscle & Fitness, heart ailment.

=== 24 ===
- Barbara Anderson, 86, New Zealand author.
- Jo Inge Bjørnebye, 66, Norwegian Olympic ski jumper, cancer.
- Walt Bodine, 92, American broadcaster.
- Todd Breitenstein, 47, American game designer (Zombies!!!), cancer.
- Harold Burns, 86, American politician, member (1972–2000) and Speaker of the New Hampshire House (1991–1996), Senate (2000–2002), throat cancer.
- Čestmír Císař, 93, Czech politician, Chairman of the National Council (1968–1969).
- Bob Colston, 84, British sports broadcaster, heart failure.
- Mariana Drăgescu, 100, Romanian military pilot, natural causes.
- Peter Duryea, 73, American actor (Star Trek, Bewitched, The Fugitive).
- Mary Gillham, 91, English naturalist.
- Hayden Griffin, 70, British scenic designer, cancer.
- Derek Leaver, 82, English footballer (Blackburn Rovers).
- Inge Lønning, 75, Norwegian theologian, educator, and politician.
- Gury Marchuk, 87, Russian scientist.
- Gerald Marwell, 76, American sociologist, social psychologist and behavioral economist.
- Walker David Miller, 73, American senior judge, United States District Court for the District of Colorado (1996–2011).
- Paolo Ponzo, 41, Italian footballer, heart attack.
- Sir Joseph Pope, 98, British engineer and academic administrator.
- Ratón, 11, Spanish fighting bull.
- Deke Richards, 68, American Motown songwriter ("ABC", "Mama's Pearl", "Maybe Tomorrow"), esophageal cancer.
- Mohamed Yousri Salama, 38, Egyptian political leader, stomach infection.
- Francis Cumming-Bruce, 8th Baron Thurlow, 101, British diplomat, Governor and Commander-in-Chief of the Bahamas (1968–1972).
- Jessica Upshaw, 53, American politician, member of the Mississippi House of Representatives (since 2004), suicide by gunshot.
- Susana Viau, 68, Argentine journalist, writer and political columnist, lung cancer.

=== 25 ===
- Léonce Bernard, 69, Canadian politician, Lieutenant Governor of Prince Edward Island (2001–2006).
- Ellen Einan, 81, Norwegian poet.
- Wayne Fleming, 62, Canadian ice hockey coach (Philadelphia Flyers), brain cancer.
- Ben Goldfaden, 99, American basketball player (Washington Capitols).
- Peter Hearn, 87, English cricketer (Kent).
- Anthony Lewis, 85, American journalist (The New York Times), winner of Pulitzer Prize (1955, 1963), kidney and heart failure.
- Dafydd Llywelyn, 74, Welsh composer, pianist, conductor and teacher.
- Majid-ul-Haq, 86, Bangladeshi Army officer and minister.
- Jean Pickering, 83, English Olympic athlete.
- Jean-Marc Roberts, 58, French editor, novelist, and screenwriter, cancer.
- Lou Sleater, 86, American baseball player (Baltimore Orioles), lung disease.
- Jack Wiley, 92, American football player (Pittsburgh Steelers).

=== 26 ===
- Margie Alexander, 64, American R&B and soul singer.
- Eddie Basha Jr., 75, American grocery businessman (Bashas').
- Deepak Bharadwaj, 63, Indian politician, shot.
- Tom Boerwinkle, 67, American basketball player (Chicago Bulls), myelodysplastic syndrome.
- Sir Michael Gow, 88, British Army general.
- Gillian Howie, 47, British philosopher, cancer.
- Juanín, 72, Spanish footballer (Córdoba CF), complications following a stroke.
- Krzysztof Kozłowski, 81, Polish journalist, Minister of the Interior and Administration (1990–1991), heart failure.
- Martyl Langsdorf, 96, American visual artist, designer of the Doomsday Clock, lung infection.
- Dave Leggett, 79, American football player (Chicago Cardinals), MVP of the 1955 Rose Bowl.
- Claudio Lippi, 42, Italian sports journalist, traffic collision.
- Giancarlo Martini, 65, Italian Formula One driver, co-founder and co-owner of Team Minardi.
- Patricia McCormick, 83, American bullfighter.
- Audrey McElmury, 70, American racing cyclist, female UCI Road World champion (1969).
- Nikola Mladenov, 49, Macedonian journalist, traffic collision.
- Jerzy Nowak, 89, Polish actor (Schindler's List).
- Danilo Orozco, 68, Cuban musicologist.
- Don Payne, 48, American television writer (The Simpsons) and screenwriter (Thor, My Super Ex-Girlfriend), bone cancer.
- René Pirolley, 81, French Olympic swimmer.
- Yury Rudov, 82, Soviet Olympic fencer.
- Nikolai Sorokin, 61, Russian actor and director.
- Sukumari, 72, Indian actress, complications from burn injury.
- Archie Thompson, 93, American Yurok native elder.
- Bill Walsh, 90, Irish hurler (Kilkenny GAA).
- Jerzy Wyrobek, 63, Polish footballer.

=== 27 ===
- Hjalmar Andersen, 90, Norwegian triple Olympic champion (1952) speed skater, trauma due to a fall.
- Yvonne Brill, 88, Canadian aerospace engineer (NASA), National Medal of Technology and Innovation (2011), complications from breast cancer.
- Keith Burch, 81, British Army major general.
- Gerald Curran, 74, American politician, member of the Maryland House of Delegates (1967–1998), pancreatic cancer.
- Alfredo De Gasperis, 79, Italian-born Canadian businessman, founder of ConDrain.
- Orozimbo Fuenzalida, 87, Chilean Roman Catholic prelate, Bishop of San Bernardo (1987–2003).
- Niraj Jain, 86, Indian Jain religious leader.
- Roosevelt Jamison, 76, American songwriter ("That's How Strong My Love Is").
- Fay Kanin, 95, American screenwriter, playwright and producer (Teacher's Pet, Friendly Fire), President of AMPAS (1979–1983).
- Guillermo Luksic Craig, 57, Chilean businessman (Antofagasta Plc), lung cancer.
- P. K. S. Raja, 100, Indian royal, Zamorin of Calicut.
- Katharine Stewart, 98, English author, crofter, teacher and postmistress.
- Paul Williams, 64, American music journalist, publisher (Crawdaddy!), and writer (Bob Dylan, Performing Artist), complications from Alzheimer's disease.
- Will Zens, 92, American filmmaker.

=== 28 ===
- Gabriel M. Ambrosio, 74, American politician, member of the New Jersey Senate, cancer (1987–1992).
- Jean-Paul Bonnaire, 69, French actor.
- George E. P. Box, 93, British statistician.
- Odis Echols, 82, American politician, member of the New Mexico Senate (1967–1976), dementia.
- Manuel García Ferré, 83, Spanish-born Argentine cartoonist, complications of heart surgery.
- John Findlater, 86, Scottish meteorologist.
- Jerald G. Fishman, 67, American technology executive, CEO of Analog Devices (since 1996), heart attack.
- Jean Floud, 97, British educational sociologist, Principal of Newnham College, Cambridge (1972–1983).
- Richard Griffiths, 65, British actor (Withnail and I, The History Boys, Harry Potter), Tony winner (2006), complications from heart surgery.
- Dale Hyatt, 87, American businessman.
- Soraya Jiménez, 35, Mexican Olympic champion (2000) weightlifter, heart attack.
- Hemed Khamis, 62, Tanzanian politician, stroke.
- László Klauz, 46, Hungarian Olympic wrestler.
- Hugh McCracken, 70, American rock and roll session musician, producer and arranger, leukemia.
- Heinz Patzig, 83, German football player and manager (Eintracht Braunschweig).
- Yuri Radonyak, 77, Soviet Olympic boxer.
- Robert V. Remini, 91, American historian and academic, Historian of the United States House of Representatives (2005–2010), stroke.
- Wolfgang Schulz, 67, Austrian concert flutist and university lecturer.
- Shi Zongyuan, 66, Chinese politician.
- Boris Strel, 53, Slovenian champion skier, suicide.
- Bob Teague, 84, American college football player and television journalist, T-cell lymphoma.
- Gus Triandos, 82, American baseball player (Baltimore Orioles), heart failure.
- John Charles Upton Jr., 56, American documentary film maker, shot.
- Robert Zildjian, 89, American musical instrument manufacturer (Sabian), cancer.

=== 29 ===
- Joseph W. Alton, 94, American politician, member of the Maryland Senate (1963–1965).
- Lawrence Auster, 64, American traditionalist conservative author and blogger, pancreatic cancer.
- Anton Bühler, 90, Swiss Olympic equestrian.
- Cheryl Chow, 66, American politician, brain cancer.
- Linda S. Cordell, 70, American archaeologist and anthropologist.
- Mike DeCicco, 85, American fencing coach (University of Notre Dame), coached five teams to national championships, heart failure.
- Barrie Dobson, 81, British historian.
- Reid Flair, 25, American professional wrestler, heroin overdose.
- Warren Freer, 92, New Zealand politician, MP for Mt. Albert (1947–1981).
- Reginald Gray, 82, Irish painter, stomach cancer.
- John J. Gumperz, 91, American linguist and academic.
- Sheila Holzworth, 51, American para-alpine skier, cancer.
- István Hont, 65, Hungarian-born British historian.
- Brian Huggins, 81, British-born Canadian journalist and actor (Trailer Park Boys).
- Enzo Jannacci, 77, Italian singer-songwriter, actor and stand-up comedian, cancer.
- Ralph Klein, 70, Canadian politician, Premier of Alberta (1992–2006), MLA for Calgary-Elbow (1989–2007), Mayor of Calgary (1980–1989), COPD and dementia.
- William P. Levine, 97, United States Army officer.
- Art Malone, 76, American drag racer, Indy car driver, and dragstrip owner, injuries sustained in an airboat collision.
- Betty Marshall, 94, American politician, first female Mayor of York, Pennsylvania (1978–1982).
- Luis Martínez Noval, 64, Spanish politician, Minister of Labor (1990–1993), complications from a fall.
- Jim Mees, 57, American Emmy-winning set designer (Star Trek: The Next Generation, Perfect Strangers), pancreatic cancer.
- Art Phillips, 82, Canadian politician, MP for Vancouver Centre (1979–1980), Mayor of Vancouver (1973–1977).
- Ernesto Rubin de Cervin, 76, Italian composer and teacher.

=== 30 ===
- Brian Ackland-Snow, 72, British production designer (A Room with a View, The Dark Crystal, Death on the Nile), Oscar winner (1986).
- Franco Califano, 74, Italian lyricist, musician, singer and actor, heart attack.
- Sucharitha Gamlath, 79, Sri Lankan academic.
- Eric Hertz, 58, American telecommunications executive, CEO of 2degrees (since 2009), plane crash.
- Daniel Hoffman, 89, American poet, United States Poet Laureate (1973–1974).
- Peter Kormos, 60, Canadian politician, Ontario MPP for Welland (1988–1999, 2007–2011) and Niagara Centre (1999–2007).
- Francisco Javier López Peña, 55, Spanish Basque separatist leader (ETA), heart attack.
- Mal Moore, 73, American college football player and coach, University of Alabama athletic director (1999–2013), pulmonary failure.
- Samueli Naulu, 31, Fijian rugby union player, traffic collision.
- Bobby Parks, 51, American basketball player and coach (Shell Turbo Chargers, University of Memphis), PBA Hall of Fame (2009), laryngeal cancer.
- Phil Ramone, 79, South African-born American record producer, aortic aneurysm.
- Edith Schaeffer, 98, American Christian leader and author.
- Bob Turley, 82, American baseball player (Baltimore Orioles, New York Yankees), World Series MVP (1958), liver cancer.
- Valeri Zolotukhin, 71, Russian actor (Bumbarash), brain tumor.

=== 31 ===
- Rod Berry, 65, American politician, member of the West Virginia House of Delegates (1987–1991).
- Charles Amarin Brand, 92, French Roman Catholic prelate, Archbishop of Monaco (1981–1984) and Strasbourg (1984–1997).
- Ernie Bridge, 76, Australian politician, member of the Western Australian Legislative Assembly for Kimberley (1980–2001), mesothelioma.
- W. E. Butts, 68, American poet, Poet Laureate of New Hampshire.
- Helena Carroll, 84, Scottish actress (Rocky V, The Jerk).
- Bob Clarke, 87, American illustrator (Mad magazine), complications of pneumonia.
- Henry Clarke, 79, American businessman and venture capitalist, developed the Klondike bar.
- Ray Drake, 78, English footballer (Stockport County).
- Dick Duden, 88, American football player (New York Giants) and coach (United States Naval Academy).
- Courtney Gonsalves, 62, Guyanese cricketer.
- Ahmad Sayyed Javadi, 95, Iranian political activist and politician, Minister of Justice (1979), Minister of Interior (1979).
- Sir Michael Jenkins, 77, British diplomat, Ambassador to the Netherlands (1988–1993).
- Bebe Lee, 96, American basketball coach and administrator.
- Mack McInnis, 79, American politician, member of the Mississippi House of Representatives (1976–1980, 1992–2000).
- Gerlof Mees, 86, Dutch ichthyologist and ornithologist.
- Pattycake, 40, western lowland gorilla, heart disease.
- Ronnie Ray Smith, 64, American Olympic champion (1968) sprinter.
- Dmitri Uchaykin, 32, Russian ice hockey player (HC Ertis-Pavlodar), cerebral hemorrhage.
