= Pennekamp (surname) =

Pennekamp (foaled 1992) is an American-bred, French-trained Thoroughbred racehorse and sire. Notable people with the surname include:

- Erich Pennekamp (1929–2013), German water polo player
- John Pennekamp, namesake of the John Pennekamp Coral Reef State Park
- Marianne Pennekamp (1924–2021), German-born American social worker and Holocaust survivor
