= Sarvis =

Sarvis is a surname. Notable people with the surname include:

- Mary Alice Sarvis (1914–1965), American psychiatrist and psychoanalyst
- Robert Sarvis (born 1976), American politician
- William Sarvis (1898–1968), Welsh footballer

== See also ==
- Sarvis Creek Wilderness
- Sarvis Fork Covered Bridge
