= Gasperis =

Gasperis is a surname. Notable people with the surname include:

- Alfredo De Gasperis (1934–2013), Italian-Canadian developer
- Kai (Alessia De Gasperis Brigante, born 1980), Canadian singer and songwriter
