= Soshenko =

Soshenko is a surname. Notable people with the surname include:

- Ivan Soshenko (1807-1876), Ukrainian painter
- Gennadi Soshenko (born 1958), Russian footballer and coach

== See also ==
- Sosenko, Sošenko
