= Beasant =

Beasant or Besant is an English-language surname derived from a coin called the byzantius, which is named after the city of Byzantium where they were first minted.

Because of the circular nature of the coins, the word byzantius, or bezant, as it travelled across Europe, came to mean the 'circle or disk' represented on a coat of arms (in old French), also known as a roundel.

The Beasants were gardeners in the King's court.

== Notable people with the surname Besant ==
- Annie Besant, prominent Theosophist, women's rights activist, writer and orator.
- Derek Michael Besant, Canadian artist.
- Henry Besant, venue manager.
- Mabel Besant-Scott, English Theosophist.
- Sir Walter Besant, English novelist and historian.
- William Henry Besant, British mathematician.

== Notable people with the surname Beasant ==
- Dave Beasant, English football goalkeeper.
- Sam Beasant, English goalkeeper.

== See also ==
- List of Old English (Anglo-Saxon) surnames
