= Jaime Guadalupe González Domínguez =

Mexican crime journalist and murder victim

- Born: 1975
- Died: 3 March 2013 (aged 38); Ojinaga, Chihuahua, Mexico
- Cause of death: Gunshot wounds
- Occupation: Journalist
- Years active: 2011–2013

Jaime Guadalupe González Domínguez (1975 – 3 March 2013) was a Mexican journalist and director of the online news portal Ojinaga Noticias, which shut down shortly after he was assassinated.

He started his journalistic career by founding an online news portal in his hometown of Ojinaga, Chihuahua. By January 2012, his newspaper began to be available on print. Ojinaga Noticias covered topics like local politics, sports activities, and crime. On his way back to work, González Domínguez was assassinated by unidentified gunmen in the Mexican state of Chihuahua on 3 March 2013. Once the attack was perpetrated, the gunmen took his camera reportedly because he had taken a photograph of an organized crime member. He is regarded as the first journalist to be killed in the administration of President Enrique Peña Nieto.

== Early life and career ==
Jaime Guadalupe González Domínguez was born in the Mexican city of Ojinaga, Chihuahua in 1975. He left his hometown for personal reasons to live outside the state, but returned to work as a reporter for the newspaper Contacto, where he worked for some years. Due to attacks on the press, González Domínguez decided to continue his journalist career online by founding the Ojinaga News portal. In early 2012, however, he encountered several death threats that forced him to relocate in Mazatlán, Sinaloa, where he reportedly lived with family members and had spent some part of his life.

Another source states that González Domínguez started his journalistic career sometime in 2011 by creating the online portal known as ojinaganoticias.com.mx after moving to Ojinaga, Chihuahua from Chicago, Illinois. In January 2012, the online portal began issuing a printed version, Ojinaga Noticias, for the public. The newspaper covered a wide range of topics in that small town of Chihuahua, including but not limited to local politics, sports, and crime.

Aside from being a journalist, González Domínguez sold publicity and conducted social events. Among his favourite hobbies was fire breathing and acting. He practiced fire breathing during evenings at street corners in Ojinaga because he said that it made him understand the hardships of people who lived in the streets. González Domínguez had several acting videos he had uploaded on YouTube depicting stories of drug traffickers and killings.

== Assassination ==
While heading to the offices of Ojinaga Noticias to issue some photographs and reports on 3 March 2013, unknown gunmen intercepted González Domínguez and shot him 18 times using FN Five-seven pistols, wounding him at a taco stand near his home in Ojinaga, Chihuahua, a border city just across from Presidio, Texas. Once the attack was perpetrated, the assassins took his camera, reportedly because he had taken a picture of a member of their organized crime group. Having survived the attack, he was taken to a nearby hospital where he died of hemothorax and hemoperitoneum 10 minutes after arriving.

Shortly after his assassination, the newspaper's website posted a message condemning the attack and uploaded a photograph in honour of González Domínguez before shutting down from fear of reprisals. The only text available at the homepage is "This page has been suspended. Please return later."

The attackers' identities, just like motives behind his assassination, are unknown. There were no official reports of any death threats prior to his killing. With González Domínguez's assassination, Mexico maintains its reputation as one of the most dangerous countries in the world for journalists. At least 50 of them were kidnapped or killed under the administration of Felipe Calderón, who served from 2006 to December 2012.

=== Background ===
Ojinaga is located on the eastern part of the state of Chihuahua; it is a lucrative smuggling zone for narcotics heading towards the United States and a battleground for rivaling drug trafficking organizations that seek to gain control of the area's routes. Local journalists believe that the criminal group that controls the area of Ojinaga is La Línea, the armed group under the tutelage of the Juárez Cartel. Chihuahua is one of the most dangerous states in Mexico in which to practice journalism. At least 11 journalists have been killed in the state since 2000, and all of their assassinations remain unsolved. (Note: Article 19 states that between 2000 and 2012, at least 10 journalists were killed in Chihuahua. Other media outlets like Proceso and La Jornada have higher figures, with 16 and 21 respectively.) On 19 February 2001, journalist José Luis Ortega Mata (aged 37), the director of a newspaper in Ojinaga, was assassinated. His death, too, remains unpunished.

González Domínguez was killed a few days before an Inter-American Press Association convention in the state of Puebla. The group has noted that journalists in Mexico face severe threats for their work. In addition, he is the first journalist killed during the administration of President Enrique Peña Nieto. (Note: Although not mentioned in the source, David Araujo Arévalo, a columnist for the Novedades de Acapulco newspaper, was killed on 22 December 2012 by unknown gunmen. Enrique Peña Nieto had already assumed the presidency on 1 December 2012.)

== See also ==
- Mexican drug war
- List of journalists killed in Mexico
