= Marianne Pennekamp =

School social worker, Holocaust survivor

Marianne Pennekamp (May 14, 1924 – December 3, 2021) was a Jewish social worker with a focus on families, children and school social work. As a child she survived the Holocaust, when her family fled from Karlsruhe to Marseille Vichy France in 1935, before immigrating to New York, after her father was released from internment camp.

== Biography ==
Pennekamp was born in Karlsruhe, Germany in 1924. Her parents were Jules and Lilly Hockenheimer. In 1941, along with her younger brother, the family became refugees from the Nazi regime and lived in Marseille. She has spoken about Hiram Bingham IV helping her and her family escape from Vichy France despite a senior US diplomat banning “his staff to refrain from giving visas to Jewish refugees or helping British POWs.”

Her 17th birthday, May 14, 1941, was spent on the SS Winnipeg in Casablanca's harbor. After traveling to Trinidad, then a British colony, she was able to travel to New York City where she met Alfred “Henk” Pennekamp. He was raised Catholic and was 19 years older than herself.

She spent twenty five years working for the Oakland City Schools as a social worker and taught at UC Berkeley and Humboldt State. After her retirement, Pennekamp worked in Humboldt County, California as the criminal Justice and Delinquency Prevention Commissioner and on the Child Death Review Committee.

=== Education ===
She attended University of California, Berkeley for her bachelor's and MSW (1954) degrees before getting a DSW from the UC Berkeley School of Social Welfare in 1975.

== Awards and honors ==
Pennekamp was honored by the Humboldt branch of American Association of University Women (AAUW) as a Women's History Month Honoree. UC Berkeley School of Social Welfare awarded her a Distinguished Alumni Award in 1999.

=== Legacy ===
California State Polytechnic University, Humboldt has established a scholarship in her name.

== Selected publications ==
Pennekamp co-authored two books - Collaboration in School Guidance: A Creative Approach to Pupil Personnel Work (1970) and Social Work Practice; Toward A Child, Family, School, Community Perspective (2nd edition, 2002).

- SARVIS, MARY A., and MARIANNE PENNEKAMP. “Collaboration in School Guidance: Task-Oriented Guidance And Its Structure.” Child Welfare, vol. 49, no. 9, 1970, pp. 502–08. JSTOR, http://www.jstor.org/stable/45393186. Accessed 22 Sep. 2022.
