= P. K. Ettanunni Raja =

Zamorin of Calicut
- In office 19 January 1998 - 16 August 2003
- Preceded by: P. K. Kuttianujan Raja
- Succeeded by: P. K. S. Raja

Personal details
- Born: 14 August 1910
- Died: 16 August 2003 (aged 93)

Puthiya Kovilakam Ettanunni Raja (14 August 1910 - 16 August 2003) was the Zamorin of Calicut (hereditary monarch) from 19 January 1998 to 16 August 2003.

== Early life ==
Ettanunni Raja was born on 14 August 1910 to Vamanan Namboothiri and Aniyathi Thampuratti. He studied at Srikrishna Vidyalayam and worked as a school teacher, clerk, and cashier at different times. Etanunni Raja was also a respected Sanskrit scholar.

== Reign ==
Etanunni Raja became Zamorin on 19 January 1998 on the death of his predecessor P. K. Kuttianujan Raja.

== Death ==
Etanunni Raja died at a private hospital on 16 August 2003. He was succeeded as Zamorin by P. K. S. Raja.
