= Olmeca Tequila =

Mexican tequila company

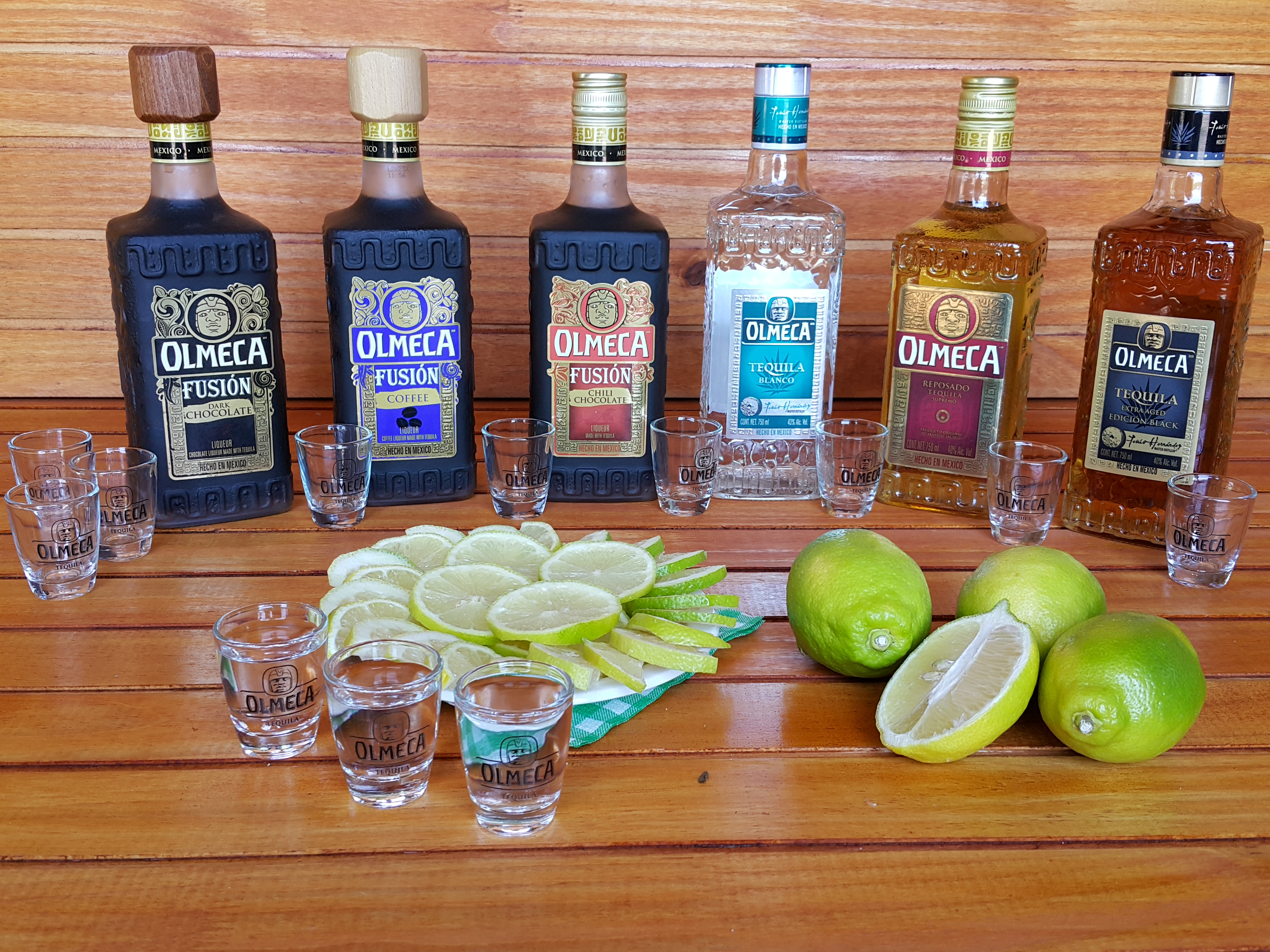
- Olmeca products
- Type: Premium Tequila
- Manufacturer: Pernod Ricard Group
- Origin: Mexico
- Introduced: 1967; 59 years ago
- Variants: Olmeca, Olmeca Altos and Olmeca Tezón

Olmeca Tequila is a tequila produced in Jalisco, Mexico. Olmeca is owned by the Pernod Ricard Group. Olmeca produces three tequilas: Olmeca, Olmeca Altos, and Olmeca Tezón.

== Production ==
Olmeca Tequila is made from blue agave. Once harvested, traditional brick ovens are used to slow cook the piñas. The production process involves using the traditional Tahona, a millstone made of volcanic rock, known locally as Tezontle, to crush the agave piñas, creating a pulp and drawing out the sweet juice from the fibers. This juice is referred to as Tahona Liquid, of which a percentage is integrated into the fermentation and distillation processes of all Olmeca Tequilas, with Olmeca Tezón containing 100% Tahona Liquid.

== Origins ==
Olmeca Tequilas are produced at Destileria Colonial de Jalisco. The Olmeca distillery is situated in the town of Arandas, Jalisco, taking advantage of the blue agave plants that are grown there.

== Variants ==
=== Olmeca Altos Tequila ===
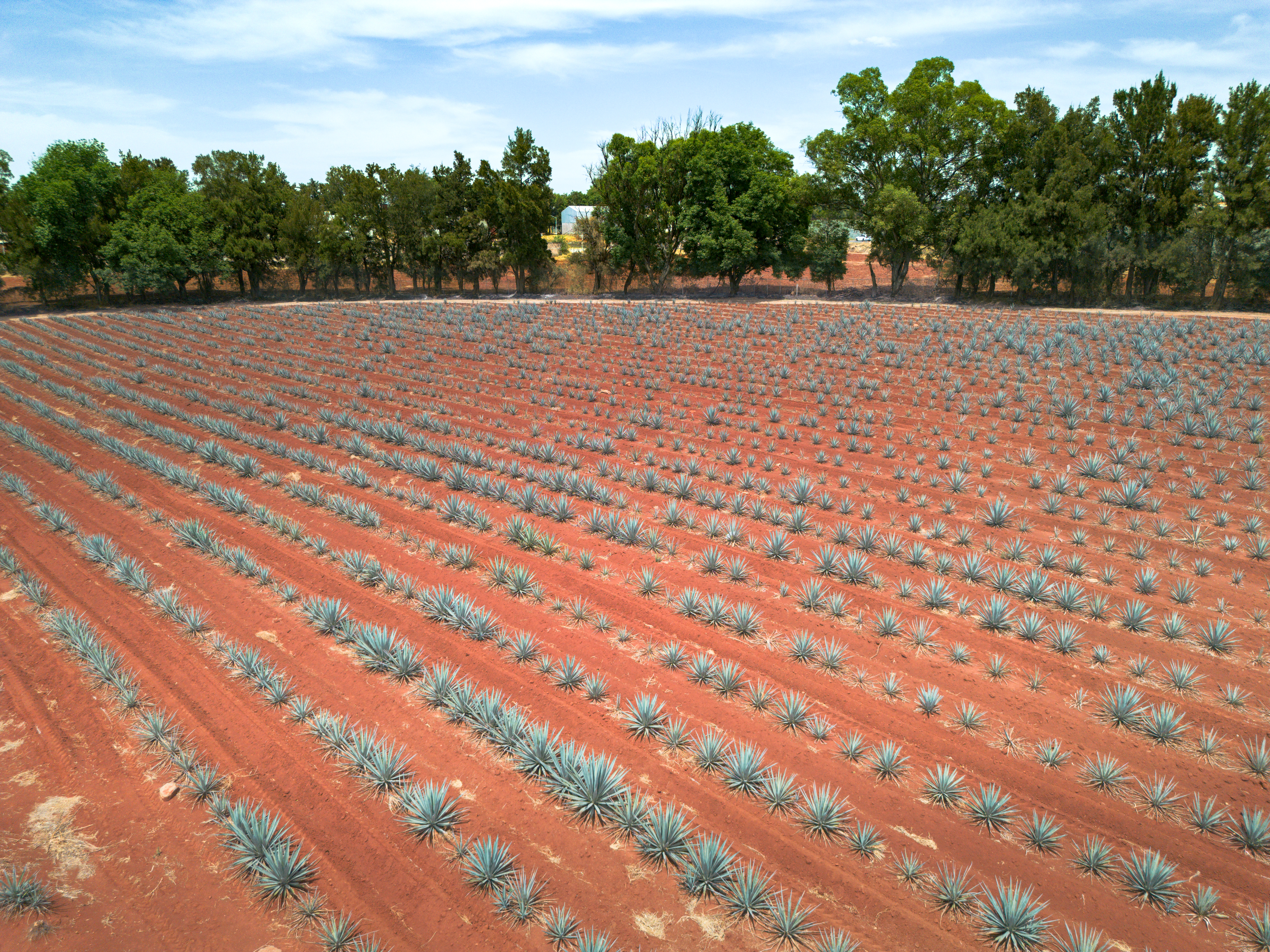
Agave fields in Los Altos, Jalisco

Olmeca Altos Tequila was launched in 2009 following a collaboration between bartenders Dre Masso and Henry Besant, master distiller Jesús Hernández, with the French company Pernod Ricard. According to the developers, the project aimed to create a tequila intended for cocktails.

Altos is produced in the Altos de Jalisco region of Mexico, using 100% blue Weber agave cultivated in volcanic soil. Once it matures, the agave is harvested and slowly cooked in brick ovens to convert its starches into fermentable sugars. After fermentation, distillation takes place in copper stills. The process uses tahona stone milling for the tequila production. Altos is produced at Destilería Colonial de Jalisco, in Arandas, Jalisco.

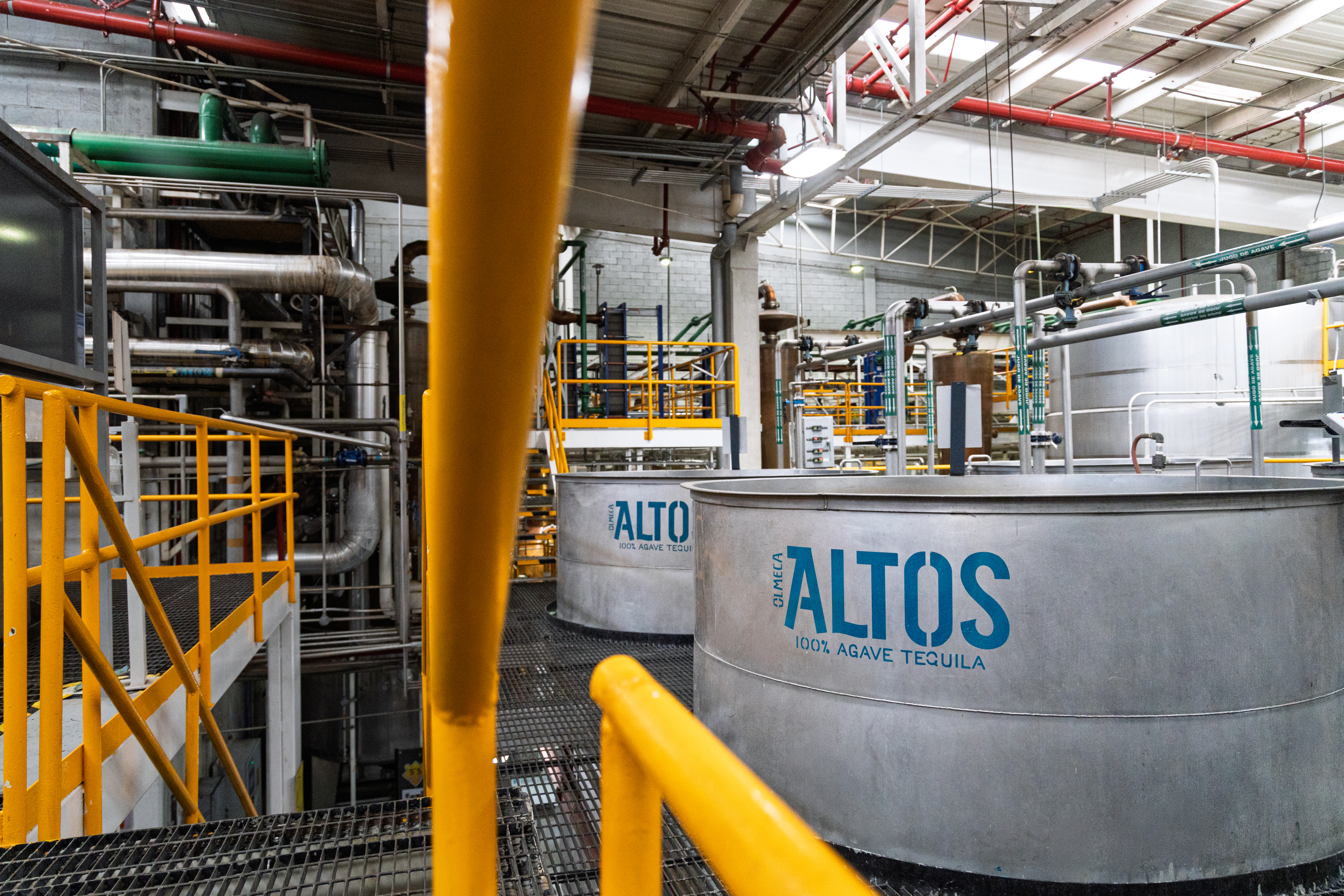
Interior of the Altos production facility in Jalisco, Mexico

Altos was initially introduced into international markets including London, Chicago, and Denver, and has expanded to other variants:

- Olmeca Altos Plata
- Olmeca Altos Reposado

The brand sells ready-to-drink and ready-to-serve products, including flavored margarita variants.

== Recognition ==
Altos has received awards in international spirits competitions, including The Tequila Masters and the San Francisco World Spirits Competition. At the 2019 The Tequila Masters, Altos Plata received a Masters medal in the Super Premium Blanco category, while Altos Reposado received a gold medal in the Super Premium Reposado category. Altos variants have also received awards at the San Francisco World Spirits Competition and the Ultimate Cocktail Challenge. Drinks International listed Altos as the leading tequila choice for Margaritas in 2023 and for Palomas in 2024.

== See also ==
- Henry Besant
