= Mary Alice Sarvis =

American psychiatrist

Mary Alice Sarvis (20 December 1914 – 16 June 1965) was an American psychiatrist and psychoanalyst active in the San Francisco Bay Area from the 1940s to the mid-1960s. Sarvis worked with the Oakland Police Department and Oakland Public Schools to increase understanding of and collaborate with underserved populations. Additionally, Sarvis maintained a private practice and taught at UC Berkeley School of Social Welfare. Established after Sarvis' unexpected death in 1965, the Mary Sarvis Memorial Fund continues the work of Sarvis by giving small, life-improving grants to Bay Area children for targeted individual needs such as medical supplies and extracurricular activities.

== Personal life and family ==
=== Early life ===
Mary Alice Sarvis was born on 20 December 1914 in Nanking, China, to Guy Walter and Pearl Maude Taylor Sarvis. She was the second child of Dr. and Mrs. Sarvis' four children, following her brother David Lieutellas (8 February 1913 – 27 June 1999), joined later by sister Marion Elizabeth (26 January 1917 – 23 July 1997) and brother Alva Taylor (27 November 1924 – 15 March 1989). Her father served as a professor of sociology and dean of the college of Arts and Sciences at the University of Nanking, where the family lived until they returned to the United States in 1926.

In China, Sarvis grew up well-educated and well-off but aware of the poverty and resource deprivation that affected the lives of those outside the university community. Psychologist Erik Erikson commented that "her early memories concerning death, injustice, and separation: the death to which newborn Chinese girls were abandoned as too great an economic burden, and her separation from her Chinese nurse." Erikson and others who knew Mary credit her girlhood experiences with injustice in China with her decision to enter medicine, specifically psychiatry.

Young Mary was known to her peers as being a tomboy, willing to accept a dare, and keen to set off fireworks. Her family nicknamed her "Buzzie," and friends in Hiram, OH called her "Bill."

=== Education ===
Sarvis graduated from high school in Hiram, Ohio. She attended Vanderbilt for a year before completing her Bachelor's in Psychology at Antioch College in 1937. Her brother, David, also attended Antioch College, and the two pursued graduate degrees simultaneously at Yale University. David enrolled in the School of Drama, and Mary attended the School of Medicine. Sarvis was one of only four women in her class and had the additional distinction of writing her thesis under the supervision of Marion Howard, a female physician. She earned her medical degree in 1942 following a thesis investigation into Bacterium necrophorum.

Sarvis returned to Ohio and contributed to the war effort by serving as the physician in charge of a Red Cross blood drive unit. She completed her medical internship at Harlem Hospital in New York City, then crossed the country to serve her psychiatric residency at the relatively new Langley Porter Neuropsychiatric Clinic in San Francisco. Sarvis remained a Bay Area resident for the rest of her life.

=== Later life ===
Throughout her adult life, Sarvis resided in Oakland and Berkeley. She never married but maintained close friendships with many other school guidance and mental health professionals. Many of these friends partnered with Sarvis on publications. Marianne Pennekamp of the Oakland School District coauthored Collaboration in School Guidance. Lydia Rapoport and Blanche Garcia also cowrote articles with Sarvis for scholarly journals. Professional aims dominated her private life, and even these coauthors, who counted themselves as close friends of Sarvis, knew little of her family background and personal history.

In other ways, her work consumed her private life. When established channels failed to meet the needs of the individuals and communities she served, Sarvis took it upon herself to find solutions at personal cost. When a young man Sarvis knew from her work lacked the funds to pay for graduate school, for example, she provided him with a loan so he could pursue his schooling. Her sister, Elizabeth "Betty" Luse, commented that Mary was "so busy with her professional life that she did not have time for hobbies."

Politically, Sarvis leaned left. "Mayor Joseph E. Smith of Oakland invited her to serve on the "Committee for City Unity," founded in 1947 as an effort to improve relations between people of different national, racial, and religious origins." Sarvis opposed bureaucracy and supported diversity, arguing for the "defeat of the machine men" in local politics.

Agents recorded her presence at a 1953 meeting of the East Bay Committee for American Activities, a group formed "for the express purpose of opposing the House Committee [on Un-American Activities, HUAC]. Her brother, David Sarvis, lived in nearby Mill Valley and worked as a draftsman; he had a rich career in amateur drama, landing a bit part in the blacklisted communist film "Salt of the Earth." Her closest sibling was her younger brother, Alva Taylor Sarvis, who studied at the Oakland School of Arts and Crafts (later called the California College of the Arts) and the University of New Mexico. A. T. Sarvis went on to have a career as a printmaker and professor of art.

=== Death ===
On June 16, 1965, Sarvis died at home. She was 50 years old.

== Career ==
Sarvis' professional associations and obligations ranged widely between private practice, teaching, and work in public agencies.

=== Oakland schools ===
In 1946, soon after she moved to the Bay Area, Sarvis became a consultant in individual guidance and development for the Oakland Public Schools, a position she held until her death.

Under the influence of Sarvis, Oakland pioneered a collaborative model for school guidance. Still a relatively new phenomenon in itself, in the mid-century, children's psychiatric medicine was structured towards individual casework in standalone clinics. A teacher or other school personnel member might make an initial referral for a particular student, but the student's treatment and progress were seldom disclosed to teachers, who likewise had no opportunity to give feedback to the clinician.

In place of endless appointments working towards unclear goals, Sarvis steered the Oakland guidance counsellors to identify and pursue "the next useful step" in collaboration with teachers, parents, principals, clinicians, and especially students themselves. The holistic model operated on the idea that small, measurable progress and not solutions should be the metric through which to assess guidance success. Individuals from a range of professions contributed their disciplinary and personal strengths towards taking this next useful step.

The Oakland School District presented guidance workers with additional challenges. School and neighborhood demographics varied widely throughout the district. Sarvis and her colleagues needed a framework that allowed them to work with poverty-stricken urban slums, nontraditional family structures, and immigrant parents with little to no English-language skills. They found an interactive, flexible model achieved more lasting and more measurable success for their students. Sarvis and coworker Marianne Pennekamp wrote an account of the model, Collaboration in School Guidance. Their methods were tested in courses at the Berkeley School of Social Work and other locations across the country.

=== University of California, Berkeley ===
Sarvis became a professor at the School of Social Welfare at the University of California, Berkeley, in 1959. She taught a course on psychoanalysis in social work to second year graduate students and collaborated on publications with several other School of Social Welfare staff members, including Lydia Rapoport and Sally De Wees. Rapoport and colleague Beulah Parker praised Sarvis' adeptness at apprehending theories from a broad range of disciplines and translating them into concrete tools for the use of social work professionals. They described her teaching and lecturing style as "unpedantic," and many of her former students went on to fruitful careers.

Sarvis and Marianne Pennekamp authored a book about their experiences in the Oakland schools. Berkeley colleague Robert A. Wasser, a Lecturer and Field Work Consultant at the School of Social Welfare, tested the manuscript with his students to provide feedback.

In addition to teaching in the School of Social Welfare, Sarvis also worked at Cowell Memorial Hospital on the Berkeley campus, first as a physician and later as a consultant to the psychiatrists, psychologists, and social workers staffing the Student Health Services.

=== Private practice ===
Sarvis entered private practice in 1955, locating her offices at 2811 College Ave., Berkeley. Tending to focus on multivariable causation, Sarvis's diagnoses were ahead of their time, and casework from her private practice led to several ground-breaking discoveries. Sarvis was among the first to examine temporal lobe damage as one of the factor in developmental disorders, including autism and paranoid attitudes.

She added psychoanalytic services to her practice after completing analytic training with the San Francisco Psychoanalytic Society in 1955 and the American Psychoanalytic Association in 1959.

=== Permanente Psychiatric Clinic ===
Sarvis helped increase accessibility to institutionalized psychiatric services. Along with psychiatrist Harvey Powelson and psychologists Mervin B. Friedman and Timothy Leary, she planned the Permanente Psychiatric Clinic, which later became a part of the Kaiser Health Plan. The clinic offered psychiatric services covered by medical insurance.

Leary, who later became famous for his experiments with psilocybin, envisioned the clinic as a sort of "psychlotron" for identifying and diagnosing elements of personality. He theorized that a controlled environment would allow clinicians to accelerate the human personality until it fractured into its component parts. He used data from the clinic to develop his theory on the interpersonal dimensions of personality, published in 1956. In the Introduction, Leary thanked Sarvis for lending "her diagnostic and therapeutic knowledge to the research group with unsparing generosity." Sarvis also appears as an authority on child personality in the text, associated with the ideas that parents can differ in their opinions of a child and that personality traits found in the grandparents can skip a generation to reappear in their grandchildren.

Stephen Rauch, another Permanente Clinic psychologist, also collaborated with Mary Sarvis on a research study. Published posthumously in 1966, their paper continued Sarvis' investigations into temporal lobe damage, reporting a case where damage was only discovered after considerable treatment.

=== Associations ===
Sarvis identified with a number of professional associations and non-profit organizations.

She was a member of the American Psychological Association, American Psychoanalytic Association, the American Medical Association, and the East Bay and Northern California Psychiatric Societies.

Additionally, she partnered with several organizations involved in the mental health of children. Sarvis served as director of the Ann Martin Foundation, a non-profit first established in Oakland in 1963 using funds left by Ann Martin, founder of the Child Development Center at Children's Hospital. The Ann Martin Foundation continues to operate to this day under the aegis of the Ann Martin Center and provides psychological and educational services to children and families. Similarly, she served as consultant for the staff of the Parent-Child Counseling Center in Orinda, founded in 1961.

At the time of her death, Sarvis was director of the Oakland Youth Employment Project. Previously, she served on the city's Mayor's Committee for Civic Unity. In addition to the aforementioned Ann Martin Foundation, Sarvis' obituary requested that memorial contributions go to the American Civil Liberties Union or the American Friends Service Committee, suggesting her membership in those organizations. According to her sister Betty Luse, Sarvis enjoyed hiking with the Sierra Club.

=== Publications ===
Sarvis published a number of single and co-authored works in a variety of fields including psychoanalysis and guidance. Her works were well received by colleagues. A selected bibliography is included below.

Year	Publication	Description
1954	"Unique Functions of Public School Guidance Programs," Mental Hygiene 38:2, pp. 285–298.	Sarvis encourages that a distinction be made between "transferable" and "non-transferable" services. Transferable services can be acquired elsewhere, but non-transferable services are those unique to a particular organization. When agencies consider which services to offer clients, they should prioritize non-transferable services.
1959	"A Concept of Ego-Oriented Psychotherapy." Coauthored with Ruth Johnson and Sally De Wees. Psychiatry: Journal for Study of Interpersonal Processes, 22: pp. 277–87	Called brief and focused intervention, particularly in times of stress. As with Collaboration in School Guidance, the work emphasized "the useful next step."
1960	"Psychiatric Implications of Temporal Lobe Damage." Psychoanalytic Study of the Child, 15: pp. 454–481.	Sarvis' study of the effects of minor temporal lobe damage on children's psychiatry created quite a bit of interest. This study profoundly affected her continued research and cemented her devotion to interdisciplinary study.
1961	"Etiological Variables in Autism." Co-authored with Blanche Garcia. Psychiatry, 24: pp. 307–17,	Sarvis and Garcia advanced that autism is a multiple-origin disorder. Based on direct observations of children in a therapeutic nursery school, their study identified minimal cerebral dysfunction as a cause factor for autism, but also fell into contemporary thinking that linked autism with distant, cold and vindictive parents (especially mothers), a popular psychoanalytic perspective.
1962	"Paranoid Reactions: Perceptual Distortion as an Etiological Agent." Archives of General Psychiatry, 6:2, pp. 157–162	In this paper, Sarvis continued her research on temporal lobe disturbance, directing psychiatrists to look for damage when treating patients exhibiting paranoid behavior.
1966	"Longitudinal Study of a Patient with Premature Ego Development." Coauthored with Stephen Rauch, Ph.D. Journal of the American Academy of Child Psychiatry, 5:1, pp. 46–65	Sarvis' extended case study identified temporal lobe damage as a cause for psychiatric disorder only after a significant passage of time.
1970	Collaboration in School Guidance. Coauthored with Marianne Pennekamp (Bruner / Mazel).	Pennekamp and Sarvis addressed how principals, teachers, mental health and social services experts (both outside and within the school), and the community needed to work together to help children create a plan that would help them function within the classroom and beyond. The mentality was towards adaptive problem-solving, through structured tasks aimed at making "the next useful step." Vignettes from many Bay Area guidance workers fleshed out the theory in action in various situations, including particularly poor neighborhoods, severely disturbed children, and the secondary school level.

== Legacy ==
=== Mary Sarvis Foundation ===
Following Sarvis' unexpected death, original publisher Basic Books suspended the contract for Sarvis and Pennekamp's Collaboration in School Guidance. Friends stepped up to remember Sarvis by carrying on her unfinished work. Their agenda included securing a publisher for Collaboration in School Guidance, as well as issuing small grants to young people who were not served by established channels of aid.

The Mary Sarvis Memorial Fund began in 1965, and was officially incorporated in 1966. The original Board of Directors included Blanche Garcia (President), Irving Berg, M.D. (vice-president), Kathleen D'Azevedo (Secretary), Beulah Parker, M.D. (Treasurer), and Janet McLeod, Henry Poppic, and Leland Vaughn.

After successfully publishing Collaboration in School Guidance with Bruner/Mazel in 1970, the Mary Sarvis Memorial Fund continued its operations. At first, an annual memorial lecture supported their projects, but eventually, the organization transitioned to fundraising by means of a yearly cocktail party / potluck.

The Mary Sarvis Memorial Fund (MSMF) continues to this day, issuing 70-80 small grants every year for amounts ranging from $0–$400.00 (most fall between $200 and $375). The MSMF is committed to fulfill critical needs of children by providing grants that makes tremendous difference in child's development. The grants are for diverse causes, the common theme being immediate projects that are not covered by existing programs but will make a significant difference in the life of a child. In developing and considering grant proposals, the MSMF encourages collaboration between children, families, and additional organizations to maximize impact, carrying on Mary Sarvis' legacy of "the next useful step."

Some past grants include:

- A senior in high school in good academic standing with college ambition enrolled in a statistics class that required a special kind of calculator. MSMF paid for the calculator.
- A foster child was in the process of reuniting with her biological family. MSMF paid for a family bonding visit to Marine World.
- A 10-year-old girl in therapy for anxiety and social awkwardness feels "great" when doing gymnastics. MSMF paid for the gymnastics class.
- A foster mother's baby was born early. She needed a car seat to be able to take her baby home. MSMF paid for the car seat.
- A 2nd grade boy's glasses fell off while playing at recess. His lenses broke. The family partnered with the optometrist and MSMF to replace with lenses.

The organization is based out of Piedmont, California.
