= Sosenko =

Sosenko, Sošenko (Ukrainian: Сосенко) is a surname, Ukrainian: сосна means 'pine'. Notable people with the surname include:

- Aleksandra Sošenko (born 1991), Lithuanian cyclist
- Anna Sosenko (1909–2000), American songwriter
- George Sossenko (1918–2013), American lecturer and activist
- Jeremy Sosenko (born 1978), American screenwriter, actor, improviser, and director
