= William P. Levine =

United States Army general

- Born: July 1, 1915; Duluth, Minnesota
- Died: March 29, 2013 (aged 97); Highland Park, Illinois
- Known for: US Army intelligence officer Holocaust speaker

William P. Levine (July 1, 1915 – March 29, 2013) was a United States Army officer. During World War II, he served in the US Army as an intelligence officer. Levine was among the first Allied Forces to enter the Dachau concentration camp in Germany. He would eventually rise to the rank of major general. After the war, he was active in the Chicago Jewish community.

== Early life ==
Levine was born in Duluth, Minnesota, to Joseph and Sadie Levine. He was the eldest of four brothers. He graduated from the University of Minnesota in 1937. After graduation, he worked in retail sales before being drafted into the Army in 1942.

== Military career ==
Levine graduated from the Army's Officer Candidate School in May 1943. He served with the 34th Anti-Aircraft Artillery Group as an intelligence officer. His unit participated in the D-Day invasion on Utah Beach, as well as the liberation of Dachau. The horrors Levine witnessed at Dachau would trouble him for the rest of his life. For a short time after the war, Levine assisted in the operation of a displaced persons camp. He assisted with the provision of food and clothing for, and the eventual resettlement of, more than 5,000 Holocaust survivors.

During his military service, the Army sent him to engineering school so that he could acquire the skills to command a company of engineers.

Levine was discharged from active military service in 1946. He continued his service in the Army Reserve, as executive officer of the XIV Corps in 1960 and rising to commanding officer in 1962. When the XIV Corps was deactivated in 1967, Levine was appointed commanding general of the U.S. Army's 84th Division (Training). He was promoted to major general later that year, the rank he would retire with in 1975.

In retirement, Levine served as chairman of a retired officers association for the Army in the Midwest.

During his military career, Levine was awarded the Legion of Merit and Distinguished Service Medal.

== Civilian career ==
In 1946, Levine, his brothers, and his cousins founded a small plastics company in Duluth that molded advertising and display signs. In 1948, he moved to Chicago to establish the Lakeside Plastics Sales Co., a separate sales division for the plastics firm. He retired in 1975.

After his retirement, Levine served as the construction project manager for many north suburban Jewish organizations. He supervised the building of the Solomon Schechter Day School in Northbrook as well as two synagogues in Deerfield, Moriah Congregation and B'nai Tikvah. Levine also supervised the renovation of North Suburban Synagogue Beth El in Highland Park.

== Holocaust speaker ==
The scenes Levine witnessed when he entered Dachau concentration camp on April 29, 1945, were so terrible that he refused to speak about them, even to his family. However, Levine believed, "the most important and effective method of preventing another Holocaust is truth and education". It was this belief that led to his speaking about his experience at Dachau nearly 40 years later.

Levine attended a 40th anniversary memorial ceremony for the Warsaw Ghetto Uprising at Yad Vashem in Jerusalem. While at the cemetery, Maurice Pirot, a Belgian Jew, recognized Levine as one of his saviors, the soldier who had rescued him by carrying him in his arms.

In May 1990, Levine recorded an oral history with the United States Holocaust Memorial Museum. He spoke about his life, wartime experience, and work with Holocaust victims.

He also spoke at Chicago's 1995 annual Holocaust Remembrance Day. He spoke about his experience and the experiences of the victims he met there.

== Personal life ==
Levine married twice. His first wife, Leah Goldberg, died in 1975. In 1980, he married Rhoda Kreiter, who survived him. He had one son and four daughters.

Levine died of respiratory failure on March 29, 2013, in Highland Park, Illinois, at age 97.

== Legacy ==
The Pritzker Military Museum & Library maintains a William P. Levine Collection containing an assortment of Levine's World War II-era military documents, maps, photographs, and artifacts. Per the Chicago Firearms Ordinance, Levine's German Walther PP 7.65-mm. handgun, which he brought back to the United States after obtaining permission from the US Army, cannot be housed at the museum; it is stored with other handguns at a gun range in Lombard, Illinois.

The Moriah Congregation in Deerfield, Illinois, has a flag circle dedicated to Levine. The flag circle and garden landscaping were dedicated on June 4, 2006, in the presence of then-US Congressman Mark Kirk and Illinois State Representative Karen May.
