= Dmitri Uchaykin =

- Born: 10 June 1980 Khabarovsk, Soviet Union
- Died: 31 March 2013 (aged 32) Kazakhstan
- Height: 5 ft 11 in (180 cm)
- Weight: 179 lb (81 kg; 12 st 11 lb)
- Position: Forward
- Shot: Left
- Played for: Amur Khabarovsk; HC Yugra; Gazovik Tyumen; Ermak Angarsk; Yertis Pavlodar
- Playing career: 1998–2013

Dmitri Viktorovich Uchaykin (Russian: Дмитрий Викторович Учайкин) (10 June 1980 – 31 March 2013) was a Russian ice hockey left-winger.

Uchaykin was born in Khabarovsk, Soviet Union.

== Hockey career ==
From 1998 until 2009, Uchaykin played for his hometown team Amur Khabarovsk. Afterwards, Uchaykin played briefly for HC Yugra (Khanty-Mansiysk), Rubin Tyumen (then "Gazovik"), and Ermak Angarsk.

Uchaykin last played for Yertis Pavlodar of the Kazakhstan Hockey Championship, since 2010.

== Death ==
On March 27, 2013, Uchaykin was on the ice of the Irtysh Pavlodar team against Arystan Temirtau in the playoff match of the Kazakhstan Ice Hockey Championship, when he received a strong blow to the neck with a stick from Donatas Kumelyauskas from Arystan. After the game, he went home, where he felt unwell. That night, Uchaykin fell into a coma. He was urgently taken to the hospital. He died of a cerebral hemorrhage at 4 a.m. on March 31 without regaining consciousness.

He was survived by his wife Anna, who was pregnant at the time of his death, and daughter Polina.

A memorial service for Uchaykin was held in Pavlodar on 2 April. Uchaykin was buried in his hometown, Khabarovsk, on 4 April.

=== Reactions ===
“We have lost one of the best players. The team and the fans are grieving, it's hard for everyone to talk about it. On April 4, the game "Ertys-Pavlodar" and "Arystan" will take place, here in Pavlodar. We dedicate it to Dmitry Uchaikin. Number 17 will be assigned to him forever, and the athlete's jersey will be raised to the ceiling, "- said the press secretary of the hockey club Veniamin Ignatenko on Monday, 1 April.

The director of Yertis Pavlodar stated to the media that Kumeliauskas's fatal hit on Uchaykin was legal. Kumeliauskas himself also denied violating the rules. No disciplinary action was taken against him by the league; nevertheless, Arystan chose to keep Kumeliauskas on the bench during the next game of the series on 1 April.

The club announced that Uchaykin's #17 would be permanently retired, and that it had paid Uchaykin's widow his remaining contract salary at the time of his death.
