= Claudio Lippi (journalist) =

Italian sports journalist and TV presenter

- Born: Claudio Raoul Vittorio Lippi; July 7, 1970; Vimercate, Italy
- Died: 26 March 2013 (aged 42); Buccinasco, Italy
- Children: 1

Claudio Raoul Vittorio Lippi (July 7, 1970, in Vimercate, Italy – March 26, 2013, in Buccinasco, Italy) was an Italian sports journalist and TV presenter of Milan Channel who died at 42 years old in a motorcycle accident.

Milan and Inter have played a special match in his memory in Milan. Milan has given his name, Claudio Lippi, to the press room at the Milanello Sports Centre.
