= Jean Crawford Cochrane =

Irish educator (1914–2013)

- Born: 27 June 1914; Lifford, County Donegal, Ireland
- Died: 23 March 2013 (aged 98); Belfast, Northern Ireland

Jean Crawford Cochrane (27 June 1914 – 23 March 2013) was an Irish educator and activist for women's education.

== Early life and education ==
Jean Crawford Cochrane was born in Lifford, County Donegal on 27 June 1914. She was the eldest daughter of a solicitor and under-sheriff for the county, Hugh and Lucy Cameron Cochrane (née Boyd). Cochrane was schooled at Ashleigh House in Belfast from 1928 to 1932, serving as head girl in her final year. She entered Trinity College Dublin (TCD) to study modern history and politics, graduating in 1938 with an honours degree. From early on she had an interest in the education and welfare of children. In her piece published in A danger to men? A history of women in Trinity College Dublin 1904–2004 (2005) she describes her membership of the Social Service Club of the Elizabethan Society during which she worked to support children living in tenement houses owned by TCD in Grenville Street. She was aware of the huge unemployment and poverty in Dublin, and described an evening lecture organised by the Social Service Club to be given by Philip Townsend Somerville-Large, the founder of the Mount Street Club for the unemployed. The group came up against the issue of the curfew for women on the TCD campus as the lecture was scheduled for an hour after the curfew at 7:30pm. Cochrane had to seek special permission to allow women to attend. She recounted that the women were met at the front gate to be escorted to the benches to sit at the back of the room away from the men, like "lepers".

== Career and activism ==
Following her graduation, Cochrane trained as a teacher at Charlotte Mason College, now part of the University of Cumbria, in Ambleside, England. She travelled to Australia, teaching at the Presbyterian Ladies School in Melbourne for five years. She returned to Ireland and attended TCD again, graduating with an MA in history in 1946. She joined the graduate associations of both TCD and Queen's University Belfast. She was appointed the principal of the Parents' National Educational Union school in London (PNEU) in 1960. As part of her work, she travelled extensively, visiting families in countries including Columbia and Hong Kong. Despite enjoying the travelling, Cochrane took up the position as headmistress of Ashleigh House, her alma mater, in 1966. She remained at Ashleigh House until she retired in 1975, teaching history and scripture alongside her administrative duties.

After her retirement, Cochrane remained engaged and active with education, environmental and spiritual matters. She was a member of the Belfast Naturalists' Field Club. She was awarded the honorary title of 'Lady Muck' in 1979 by the Ulster Trust for Conservation. For 47 years, she was a member of the Linen Hall Library, and was awarded an honorary membership in recognition in 1999 of her services as governor from 1992 to 1997 and for her support of the library's millennium development fund. For her contribution to the Church of Ireland, she was made a Royal Maundy recipient at St Patrick's Cathedral, Armagh, by Queen Elizabeth II in 2008. This was the first Maundy service to take place outside England and Wales since the services began in medieval times.

== Death and legacy ==
Cochrane died in Belfast on 23 March 2013. In her memory, the Jean Crawford Cochrane scholarship was established by her friend and executrix, Frances Grant. The scholarship is awarded to young women from Northern Ireland to study at QUB who face financial constraints.
