= Charles Galbreath =

American politician (1925–2013)

Charles Ford "Charlie" Galbreath (December 12, 1925 – March 5, 2013) was an American jurist and legislator.

Born in Nashville, Tennessee, Galbreath served in the United States Marine Corps during World War II. Following the war, he received his law degree from Cumberland University and practiced law. Galbreath served in the Tennessee House of Representatives 1960–1968. He then served on the Tennessee Court of Appeals 1968–1978.

In 1978, Tennessee lawmakers tried to remove Galbreath from the Court of Appeals on numerous grounds, including his sending a letter on official stationery to Hustler magazine depicting his preferred sexual acts and publicly describing Judicial Standards Commission members as "sons of (expletive)". Lawmakers did not have enough votes to remove Galbreath; instead, they censured him, and he resigned.

Galbreath died in Nashville, Tennessee.
