= Thomas Qian Yurong =

Chinese Roman Catholic bishop

Thomas Qian Yurong (1914 – March 22, 2013) was the Roman Catholic bishop of the Roman Catholic Diocese of Xuzhou, China.

Ordained to the priesthood in 1945, he was ordained a bishop by the Chinese government without papal approval in 1959. However, in 2007, Qian Yurong received papal approval. He retired in 2011.
