= Robert Danhof =

American judge (1925–2013)

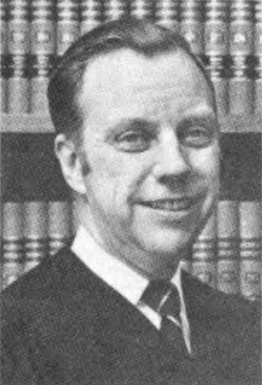
Robert Danhof c. 1977

Robert J. Danhof (August 24, 1925 – March 1, 2013) was an American jurist.

Born in Grand Rapids, Michigan, Danhof received his bachelor's degree from Hope College and his law degree from University of Michigan Law School. He practiced law and served as United States District Attorney for the United States District Court for the Western District of Michigan.

Danhof served in the Michigan Constitutional Convention of 1961–1962, despite being one of the youngest members there. He was chairman of the judiciary committee at the Michigan Constitutional Convention which drafted Article VI of the present Michigan Constitution on the judiciary. Governor George W. Romney appointed Danhof legal counsel in 1962. In 1969, Danhof was appointed to the Michigan Court of Appeals and served as chief judge.

In 1992, he retired and was appointed to the Michigan Historical Commission. After a long battle with cancer and other health issues, he died in East Lansing, Michigan in March 2013.

== Notes ==
Party political offices
Preceded by Stephen C. Bransdorfer	Republican nominee for Michigan Attorney General; 1962	Succeeded by Morris Warshawsky
