= Mohamed Yousri Salama =

Egyptian politician, writer and activist (1974–2013)

- Born: 1 October 1974; Alexandria, Egypt
- Died: 24 March 2013 (aged 38); Alexandria, Egypt
- Occupations: Dentist; Writer

Mohamed Yousri Salama (Arabic: محمد يسري سلامة; 1 October 1974 – 24 March 2013) was an Egyptian politician, writer and activist.

== Early life and education ==
Salama was born in Alexandria on 1 October 1974. He was the son of a professor of literature at Alexandria University, and his mother was a poet. He studied dentistry. He also studied theology in Alexandria. His teachers were Salafi preachers, including Mohamed Ismail Al Moqadem, who has a tolerant approach.

== Career ==
Salama began to work as a dentist in his own clinic. However, he left the job and worked as a researcher and translator at the Bibliotheca Alexandrina Manuscript Centre. He joined politics during the Egyptian revolution in 2011. After the revolution, he became a member and spokesperson of the Salafist Nour Party. He left the party due to disagreements in August 2011. Then he joined the liberal Constitution Party led by Mohamed ElBaradei becoming one of its founding members. In addition, Salama was one of the senior figures of the party and a member of its supreme body.

=== Works ===
Salama published several books. He also wrote for several Egyptian newspapers, including Al Shorouk, Al Masry Al Youm and Al Dostour. In addition, his articles were published as book chapters. One of his articles published in August 2012 deals with the relationships between Copts and Salafists in the Egyptian context.

== Death and funeral ==
Salama died of stomach disease at the age of 38 on 24 March 2013 in Alexandria. His funeral was held in Alexandria on 25 March 2013.
