= Condrain =

Canadian construction company

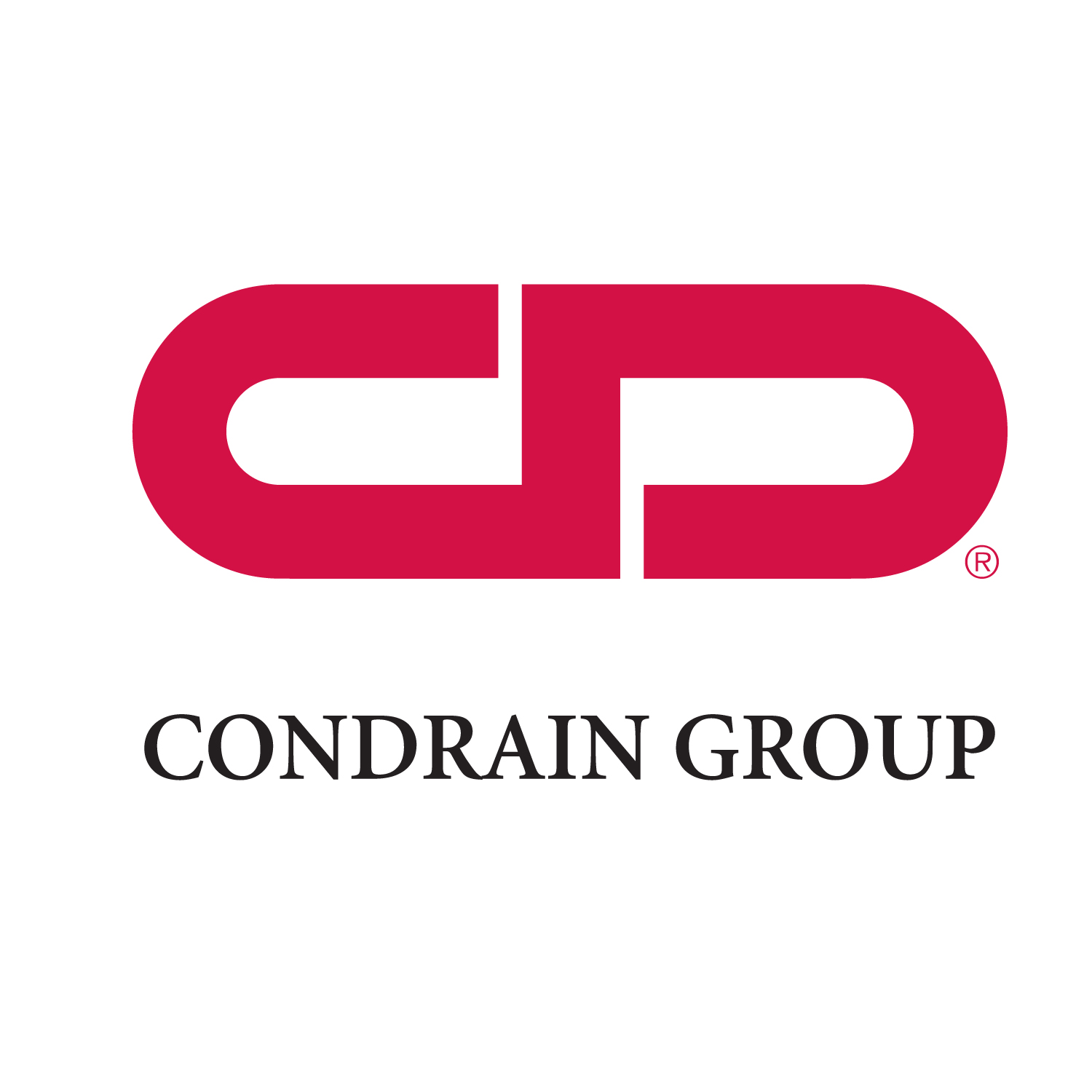
- Type: Private
- Industry: Construction
- Founded: 1954
- Founder: Alfredo De Gasperis; Angelo De Gasperis; Antonio De Gasperis
- Headquarters: Concord, Canada
- Website: www.condrain.com

Condrain Group, stylized as Condrain and Con-Drain is a Canadian sewer and watermain company, founded in 1954.

== Activities ==
Companies in the Condrain Group construct roads, supply aggregate materials; produce concrete pipes, precast units and lighting poles; manufacture valves and fittings, install gas lines, power lines, fibre optic cables, and street lighting, build houses and commercial and industrial buildings, and develop land for community living. Other related companies have included broadband communication, vineyards, such as Vineland Estates in the Niagara Peninsula, and built golf courses.

== History ==
Condrain was founded in 1954 by brothers originally from Sora, Lazio, Italy, Alfredo De Gasperis, Angelo De Gasperis, and Antonio Degasperis, as a concrete and drain company. Condrain later expanded into land development and produced other related companies. Condrain conducts business mainly within the Greater Toronto Area, the Golden Horseshoe, Western Ontario, the Ottawa Region as well as in other provinces and the United States.

Before 1960, Angelo and Alfredo De Gasperis operated their company out of a small bungalow near Highway 401 in Toronto. During the 1960s, Condrain ran many projects in the Niagara Region. They installed many water and sewer lines in subdivisions within Thorold, Welland, Niagara Falls, and St Catharines.

In 1971, development of the community of Erin Mills commenced in the new City of Mississauga, to the west of Toronto. Cadillac Developments Limited, the developer of the 7,000-acre land assembly, hired Condrain to service their subdivisions. In 1972, Condrain expanded into community and neighbourhood development by creating Metrus Developments Inc., and into commercial-industrial real estate by forming Metrus Properties Limited. Condrain entered the road construction industry in 1980. Another company under Condrain, Conelco, was founded in 1978 for the land servicing industry, specializing in the installation of underground power and telephone systems. Metrus created many planned communities north of Toronto, including Weston Downs in Vaughan and Bayview Hill in Richmond Hill.

Crowle Fittings and Supply Ltd was acquired in 1986, producing a line of products which includes cast iron saddles and fittings, valves and hydrants. Con Cast Pipe was created in 1989. Con-Elco acquired Fellmore Electrical Contractors in 1991 to produce roadway lighting and gas line installation. Futureway Communications was created in 1998 as a data, telephone and video service provider. It is now currently owned by Rogers Communications. Sky Cast Inc. was created to manufacture telephone poles. Ontario Concrete Products began operations in 2002 as a precast concrete pipe manufacturing company using robotic technology.

In 2023, the company was criminally charged with six counts of criminal negligence causing death after six people died when their vehicle fell into a pit at a construction site in Barrie managed by the company. The charges were dropped later that year.
