= Carlo Lotti =

Italian engineer (1916–2013)

Carlo Lotti (30 March 1916 – 6 March 2013) was an Italian engineer and professor of hydraulic construction. He created the C. Lotti & Associati engineering firm. He was born and died in Rome.

== Biography ==
Lotti graduated from the Roman Institute of Technology at the top of his class. He served in World War II until the ceasefire of September 1943 and then decided to join the liberated southern Italy and became captain.

Lotti lectured on “Methodology of hydraulic works” at the Roman Technical University. His professional career started in 1946 with Cidonio construction company. In 1957 he founded the engineering company bearing his name.

Lotti married Marcella Bini MD and had two children. His daughter, Patrizia is the president of the Society and his son, Massimo, is a lawyer. In 1977 Carlo was nominated as a Knight of the Republic by the president of Italy. He founded the association of civil engineers in Italy (OICE) and was the honorary president of the Italian Hydrotechnical Association.

== Major projects ==
Lotti participated in numerous projects, from 1957 together with his associates and then as a company C. Lotti & Associati SpA.

=== Dams in Africa ===
The first project in Africa on behalf UNDP, concerned the economic feasibility of agricultural production and river transport.

In 1973 the European Community entrusted Lotti for the construction of a dam on the Sankarani river, tributary to the Niger, near the town of Sélingué. The 35m high dam was completed under the supervision of the designer in 1980. The electric power generated non only covers the domestic demand but it is also exported to the neighboring countries. Furthermore, the dam controls the flood, and, above all, provides for a rich fishery.

The creation of the Bakolori dam in the Northern Nigeria, in collaboration with Nuovo Castoro company, is of great importance. The project includes a large dam equipped with 3MW hydropower plant and the irrigation scheme for 23000 ha. A second project in the area was the Goronyo Dam with a reservoir of one billion m³.

=== River basin planning ===
The complete basin planning requires the participation of experts from several sectors: hydrology, hydraulics, agriculture, economy, engineering and others. A mathematician is capable of handling all factors together. The methodology was developed at the Harvard University. Important project derived from the collaboration between Lotti and the Harvard group for optimal use of water resources.

A first project concerned the Sava river, tributary to the Danube. The UNDP project was assigned jointly to Lotti and Hydroject of Prague. The model selected 32 reservoirs out of the 57 examined.

The first application of the method within Italy was the Tiber project, under the direction of IRSA.

After the disastrous flood in 1966, that severely damaged the historical center of town, it was imperative to examine the possible solution for flood protection. The complexity of the project led to the application of a mathematical model. The result of the model indicates the optimal set of works needed for the use of the waters.

The Emilia Region contains several tributaries to the Po river. A complex network of artificial canals connects these rivers. The projects analyzes the resources and the demand for different uses. The company Idroser of the Emilia Region participated in the project and was entrusted for the implementation.

The Plan for the Waters of the Sardinia region analyzed all the aspects of the current and potential future uses of the waters. In a first phase data were collected on hydrology and potential water demand. In the next phase the existing and possible future works were studied. The third phase applied the data to a mathematical model for the selection of the optimal solution that can satisfy the future demand and provide protection against flood hazard.

Lotti created a research institute, Hydrocontrol, specializing on water resources. The institute trained thirty young researchers.

The quality of the waters of the Piracicaba basin in Brazil was studied with a mathematical model. The result indicates the degree of treatment necessary.

=== Messina bridge ===
Lotti participated in the international contest for the design of the bridge across the Messina strait. The area of relevant study regarded a new under water foundation procedure. The solution presented received a price but the final choice for construction is based a single span, which will be the longest in the world.

=== Flood control in China ===
Lotti went to China for the first time in 1971 with the Italian Foreign Commerce Ministry delegation. Successively, a project for flood control management started in 1982. The Italian Technical Cooperation financed the project. The aim of the projects was not only the development of the plan but included the training of the personnel and supply of a pilot measuring network. The study area was the river Han, tributary to Yangtze. A large dam was built for flood control and hydropower. The optimal management of the dam is of great economic and environmental significance. Another, similar project concerned the river Huai.

=== Municipal water network ===
The loss of water in municipal network represents and significant reduction of the available resources. The detection and repair of the losses is a convenient way of finding “new resources”.

Lotti carried out several project with help instruments and mathematical models for the search of losses. In Messina, 455 km (283 mi) of pipe was examined and the relevant measuring instruments put in operation. Similar projects were carried in Reggio Calabria, Catania, in Aosta.

Also outside of Italy, water networks were monitored, e.g., Bucharest in Romania, Durrës in Albania, in Ukraine, in Moldavia, and in Nkayi, Congo.

=== Road and railways ===
- Zagreb – Split and Sarajevo – sea shore highway
- Agri valley road
- High speed railway Bologna - Milan and Milan - Verona
- Urban railway Roma -Pantano
- Roman subway Line C
- Yaounde - Kribi road on nel Cameroon
- Shar – Barman road and Kabul ring road in Afghanistan

== Literature ==
- Lotti Carlo - Gorio Nino, Un lungo cammino. Cinquant'anni di ingegneria nel mondo, ill., 296 p., Ed. Hoepli, Milano 2008, ISBN 88-203-4081-X
