= Gerald D. Klee =

American psychiatrist

- Born: Gerald D'Arcy Klee; January 29, 1927; New York City, U.S.
- Died: March 3, 2013 (aged 86); Towson, Maryland, U.S.
- Education: Harvard Medical School

Gerald D'Arcy Klee (January 29, 1927 – March 3, 2013) was an American psychiatrist and medical educator who made public the secret LSD experiments involving American servicemen in the late 1950s.

== Early life and education ==
Klee was a native of Brooklyn, New York City. He enlisted in the U.S. Army following his graduation from high school in 1944. He was assigned to the Office of Liquidation in Paris. After his discharge from the Army in 1946, he attended McGill University, where he received a bachelor's degree in 1948.

After receiving a degree from Harvard Medical School in 1952, he interned at the U.S. Public Health Hospital on Staten Island, New York. He completed his residency in psychiatry at Johns Hopkins University and the Veteran's Hospital in Perry Point, Maryland. He served as director of the University of Maryland, College Park's Division of Adult Outpatient Psychiatry from 1959 to 1967 and then served in a similar position at Temple University in Philadelphia, from 1967 to 1970. He also taught at the University of Maryland, Temple University, and Johns Hopkins University in Baltimore. He maintained a private practice until his retirement in 2000.

== Career ==
In 1975, Klee confirmed reports of secret research in the effects of LSD on U.S. military personnel. The experiments, conducted between 1956 and 1959, stemmed from a contract between the U.S. Army and the University of Maryland Medical School's Psychiatric Institute for physiological and psychological tests on soldiers. Hundreds of soldiers were given LSD.

"The university's role was to conduct scientific experimentation," Klee told the Baltimore Evening Sun in 1975. The test subjects "were mostly enlisted men - there were a few commissioned officers - but they were mostly unlettered and rather naive.... They were told it was very important to national security."

Klee himself tried LSD prior to the Army experiments. "I felt obliged to take it for experimental reasons and also because I didn't think it would be fair to administer a drug to someone else that I hadn't taken myself," he said in his interview with the Evening Sun.

Klee later led an unsuccessful effort to get President Richard Nixon to renounce the use of LSD as a chemical weapon.

== Death ==
On March 3, 2013, Klee died of complications from surgery at the University of Maryland St. Joseph Medical Center in Towson, Maryland, at age 86.
