= Jack Stevens (Australian footballer) =

Australian rules footballer

Personal information
- Full name: Jack Stevens
- Born: 24 July 1929
- Died: 15 March 2013 (aged 83)
- Original team: North Geelong
- Height: 177 cm (5 ft 10 in)
- Weight: 75 kg (165 lb)

Playing career^{1}
| Years | Club | Games (Goals) |
| 1950–52 | Geelong | 11 (4) |
| 1953 | South Melbourne | 3 (1) |
| Total | | 14 (5) |
- ^{1} Playing statistics correct to the end of 1953.

Jack Stevens (24 July 1929 – 15 March 2013) was an Australian rules footballer who played with Geelong and South Melbourne in the Victorian Football League (VFL).

Stevens was captain-coach of the Lismore Football Club in the Western Plains Football League in 1954 and lead them to a premiership.
