= Ali Al Numairy =

First Emirati plastic surgeon

Ali H. Al Numairy
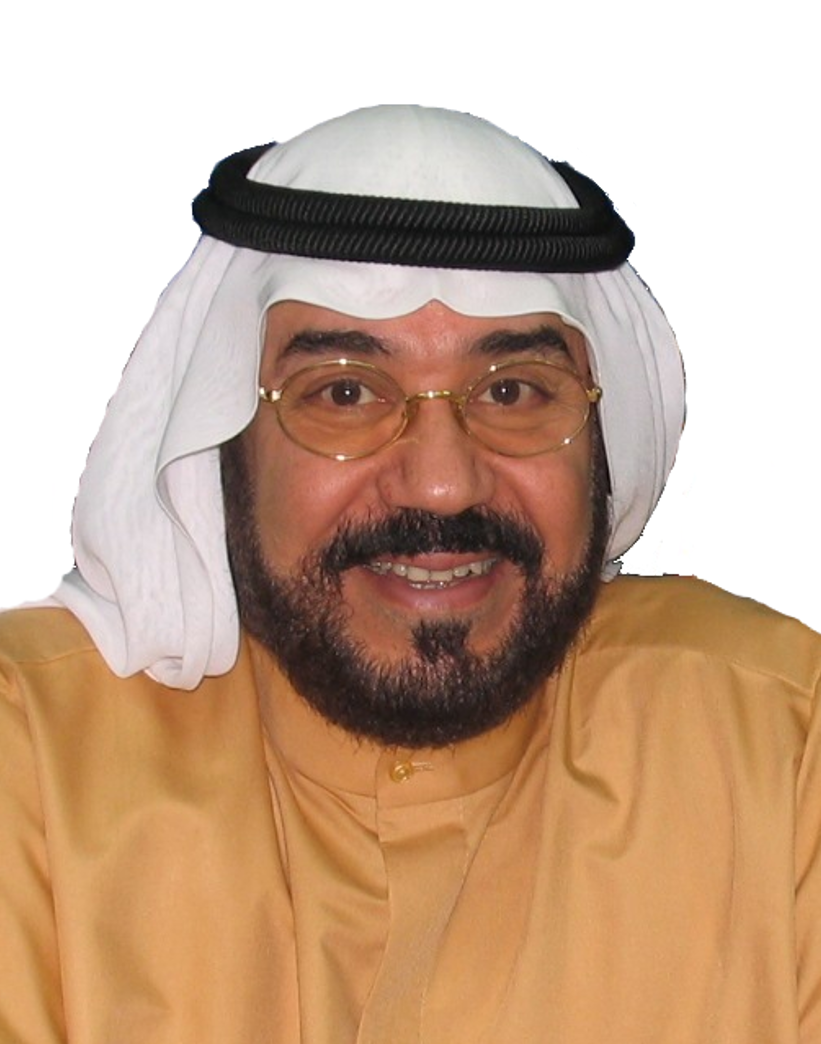
- Numairy in 2011
- Born: 18 May 1956
- Died: 7 March 2013 (aged 56); Dubai, UAE
- Occupation: Plastic Surgeon
- Years active: 1980–2013
- Known for: First Emirati plastic surgeon

Ali Al Numairy (1956 – 7 March 2013) was an Emirati plastic surgeon most notably known as the first Emirati plastic surgeon.

== Early life and education ==
Al Numairy graduated from medical school from the University of Cairo. He did his internship in Rashid Hospital and later specialized in Plastic surgery in University of Lyon.

== Career ==
After completing his education, Ali Al Numairy worked at the Department of Health & Medical Services in Dubai. He furthered his medical expertise by working in various hospitals in and around Lyon, France, between 1980 and 1984. During his time in France, he specialized in maxillo-facial reconstruction techniques, microsurgery, transplantation, and aesthetic surgery. Returning to the UAE, he continued to contribute to the Department of Health & Medical Services as a Registrar and eventually rose to the position of Consultant Plastic Surgeon and Head of Plastic Surgery & Burn Injuries Unit. He also played a pivotal role in founding and presiding over the Plastic Surgery Society of the Emirates Medical Association.

== Achievements ==
Throughout his career, Ali Al Numairy held significant roles in the medical community, including:

- Vice President of the Arab Medical Union since 2010,
- President of the UAE Section of the International College of Surgeons (ICS) since 2009,
- World Vice President of ICS since 2010,
- Visiting professor of surgery at Sharjah University,
- President of the UAE Plastic Surgery Society – EMA,
- Secretary General of the GCC Association of Plastic Surgeons (Gulf Co-operative Council Countries) since 2007,
- Sworn-in member of the Higher Committee of Medical Liability in the UAE,
- Member of the Medical Legislation Committee in the UAE,
- Member of the Higher Committee of Health Research in the UAE,
- General Secretary of the e-Health Scientific Society (e-HSS),
- Founder of the Emirati biker group called UAE Tigers.

== Death ==
Al Numairy lost his life in a fatal motorcycle accident on 7 March 2013 around 9:35 pm. While riding his Harley-Davidson motorcycle, he was involved in a collision with a vehicle driven by an individual suspected of running a red light. The ruler of Dubai extended condolences to his family.
