= John Findlater =

Meteorologist and air crash investigator

- Born: 19 May 1926; Motherwell, Scotland
- Died: 28 March 2013 (aged 86)
- Occupations: Meteorologist; aviation expert

John Findlater (19 May 1926 – 28 March 2013) was a leading Scottish meteorologist, aviation expert and air crash investigator who worked with the British Meteorological Office from 1945 until his retirement in 1989. He received numerous awards for his scientific research and public service, including the LG Groves Memorial Prize (which he won twice) and the Imperial Service Medal.

== Early life ==
Findlater was born in Motherwell, Scotland, in May 1926, the son of a railway superintendent. He moved to Inverness at a young age, and was educated at Inverness Royal Academy, where he developed a fascination with aircraft.

== Second World War ==
During the Second World War, Findlater served in the RAF, working aboard weather-monitoring ships in the Atlantic Ocean. Later in the war, he survived a violent plane crash in a Bristol Blenheim light bomber at an Inverness airfield, being the only crewperson to escape without serious injury. While in the RAF, Findlater became highly knowledgeable about aircraft and aeronautical engineering, and worked as a consultant and researcher with the RAF numerous times in his later career.

== Met Office work and retirement ==
After the war, Findlater joined the Met Office, beginning his career as a teacher of meteorology in Nairobi, Kenya. While in Kenya, he began studying the monsoon winds that develop around the Horn of Africa, conducting hundreds of research flights over the Indian Ocean to gather data. During this period, he discovered a previously unknown wind system that blows diagonally across the Indian Ocean parallel to the Somali coast; the phenomenon was named the Findlater jet in his honour. Findlater furthermore received the LG Groves Memorial Prize for his research.

He then returned to the United Kingdom, where he served as a Principal Scientific Officer and air crash investigator for the Met Office. In 1987, two years before his retirement from the Met Office, Findlater investigated the haar, or coastal fog, that affected operations at RAF bases in Scotland. He received a second LG Groves Memorial Prize for this work.

Findlater retired from the Met Office in 1989, receiving the Imperial Service Medal for his distinguished service. He continued to offer expert advice on aviation policy in his later years, advocating for the conservation of aircraft such as the Hawker Siddeley Nimrod maritime patrol jet. He died in March 2013 at the age of 86.

== Personal life ==
Findlater was survived by his wife, Mary, and daughter, Fiona. He was a proficient glider pilot, at one point working as a glider flight instructor at Lasham Airfield in Hampshire.
