= Ian Wilson (Irish cricketer) =

Irish cricketer

Personal information
- Born: 13 October 1932; Clonmel, County Tipperary, Ireland
- Died: 8 March 2013 (aged 80); Oswestry, Shropshire
- Source: ESPNcricinfo, 10 June 2016

Ian Wilson (13 October 1932 – 8 March 2013) was an Irish cricketer. He played three first-class matches for Ireland between 1956 and 1961.
