= P. K. S. Raja =

Zamorin of Calicut
- In office 16 August 2003 - 27 March 2013
- Preceded by: P. K. Ettanunni Raja
- Succeeded by: P. K. Manavikraman Raja

Personal details
- Born: 22 March 1913
- Died: 27 March 2013 (aged 100)

Puthiya Kovilakathu Sree Manavedan Raja (22 March 1913 – 27 March 2013) was the titular Zamorin of Calicut (Samoothiri) from 16 August 2003 to 27 March 2013. He was the 147th Samoothiri, and the last to hold power over Guruvayur Temple. He was married to Smt. Bharathy Thamburatty from the royal family of Nilambur Kovilakam.

== Early life and education ==
Manavedan Raja was born on 22 March 1913 to A. K. T. K. M. Ashtamoorthi Namboothiripad and Kunhithambatty Thambooratthy at Thiruvanur near Calicut (present-day Kozhikode). Manavedan Raja had his schooling at the Zamorin's High School, Calicut and graduated in mathematics from Loyola College.

== Career ==
Manavedan Raja was employed with the Post and Telegraph Department and served as an officer in Chittagong when Japanese Air Force bombarded the city during the Second World War.

== Reign ==
Manavedan Raja was crowned Zamorin on the death of his predecessor P. K. Ettanunni Raja on 16 August 2003. The post was largely ceremonial as their power had been extinguished in the 18th century. Manavedan Raja was, however, trustee to over 80 Hindu temples and held a permanent seat in the managing committee of the Guruvayur temple.

== Death ==
Raja died on 27 March 2013, five days after turning 100, and on the eve of his birthday according to Malayalam calendar - Atham (Hasta) star in the month of Meenam. He was cremated with full state honours on the same day at his family crematorium. He is survived by his three daughters. His wife Bharathi predeceased him in 2003.
