= Frederic Mayer =

German opera singer

Frederic Mayer (21 April 1931 – 20 March 2013) was an American operatic tenor who was active mostly in Germany, especially at the Staatstheater am Gärtnerplatz, Munich, where he was a member of the company for nearly thirty years.
