= Sukhraj Aujla =

Punjabi folk singer (1968–2013)

Sukhraj Aujla (2 January 1968 – 23 March 2013) was a Punjabi folk singer. He became popular after singing songs like Nimi nimi tarian di lo and Rangli Madhani. He died on 23 March 2013 in a road crash.
