= Ken Wellman =

Australian ice hockey player

Personal information
- Nationality: Australian
- Born: 2 June 1930 Melbourne, Australia
- Died: 21 March 2013 (aged 82) Melbourne, Australia

Sport
- Sport: Ice hockey

Ken Wellman (2 June 1930 – 21 March 2013) was an Australian ice hockey player. He competed in the men's tournament at the 1960 Winter Olympics.
