= Leszek Gondek =

Leszek Gondek (Włodzimierz Wołyński, Poland, 22 March 1939 – 22 March 2013, Gdańsk, Poland)) was a Polish lawyer, historian, essayist, and writer specializing in 20th-century European and Polish history. He was a professor at the Gdansk University of Physical Education and Sport.

== Life ==
Leszek Gondek's parents were Zdzisław, an artillery captain murdered by the Soviets in March 1940 in the Katyn Forest Massacre; and Janina, née Wałęga, a Polish and Ukrainian teacher. Leszek Gondek served for some years as a lieutenant in Polish counterintelligence.

== Research ==
Gondek's fields of research included the World War II Polish Underground State's justice system; Polish postwar military missions; the political, economic, and military consequences of the War for occupied Germany; and the postwar role of air sports and physical training in the development of defense strategies by Poland's armed forces.

Gondek's analysis of the Polish Underground State's special military courts, civil courts, and special commissions is based on legal papers and documents published during the World War II occupation of Poland. He devotes much attention to legal and structural changes experienced by these organizations over the course of the war, as in the case of the National Armed Forces and the Tatra Confederation (Konfederacja Tatrzańska) behind the Soviet front. Gondek seeks to present the many challenges faced by the Underground judiciary across the territory of the prewar Polish Second Republic.

== Works ==
- Co-author with Barbara Kosiorek-Dulian, Działalność Abwehry na terenie Polski 1933-1939 (Abwehr Operations in Poland, 1933–1939), Warsaw, 1974, 414 pp.
- Wywiad polski w III Rzeszy 1933-1939. Zarys struktury, taktyki i efektów obronnego działania (Polish Intelligence in the Third Reich, 1933–1939: An Outline of the Structure, Tactics, and Effects of Defensive Operations), Warsaw, Wydawnictwo Ministerstwa Obrony Narodowej ([Polish] Ministry of National Defense), 1978 and 1982, 344 pp.
- Polskie misje wojskowe 1945-1949: polityczno-prawne, ekonomiczne i wojskowe problemy likwidacji skutków wojny na obszarze okupowanych Niemiec (Polish Military Missions, 1945–1949: Political-legal, Economic, and Military Problems in the Remediation of the War's Consequences in Occupied Germany), Warsaw, Wydawnictwo Ministerstwa Obrony Narodowej ([Polish] Ministry of National Defense), 1981, 329 pp.
- Na tropach tajemnic III Rzeszy (In Pursuit of Third Reich Secrets), 1987, 204 pp.
- Polska karząca 1939-1945: Polski podziemny wymiar sprawiedliwosci w okresie okupacji niemieckiej (Poland Punishes, 1939–1945: Polish Underground Dispensation of Justice under German Occupation), Warsaw, Instytut Wydawniczy Pax, 1988, ISBN 83-211-0973-X, 202 pp.
- Agresja Stalina na Polskę (Stalin's Aggression on Poland), Wydawnictwo Agencja, 1990, ISBN 8370012957, 106 pp.
- W imieniu Rzeczypospolitej: wymiar sprawiedliwości w Polsce w czasie II wojny światowej (In the Name of the [Polish] Republic: the Dispensation of Justice in Poland during World War II), Wydawnictwo Naukowe PWN (Polskie Wydawnictwo Naukowe), 2011, ISBN 8301165790, 222 pp.
