= Danilo Orozco =

Cuban musicologist and professor

Danilo Orozco González (1944 – March 26, 2013) was a Cuban musicologist and professor.

== Academic background ==
Danilo Orozco began studying music with Moraima Guash at the Juan Bautista Sagarra School in Santiago de Cuba, where he participated in the choir activities. He also studied classical guitar with professor Guillermo Dufourneau in the same city.

With his degree thesis La categoría Son como componente de la identidad nacional de Cuba, Danilo Orozco earned himself a Doctorate Summa Cum Laude in Philosophical and Musicological Sciences from the Humboldt University in Berlin, Germany ”.

== Professor ==
From 1969 to 1972 he worked as a professor of musical acoustics at the National School of Arts. He also taught numerous extra-curricular courses and seminars about subjects such as: Disciplines and formative actions in musical acoustics, Analytical procedures of contemporary music, Introductory seminar to musical techniques and trends from the 20th Century, Cultural processes, tradition and rupture and Analysis of works from the Renaissance and Baroque.

Danilo Orozco was frequently invited to offer postgraduate courses and seminars by reputable educational institutions such as the Tchaikovsky Conservatory and the Central Institute of Art Research in Moscow, the University of Panama (1982), the Conservatory of Rio de Janeiro (1989), the Vicente Emilio Sojo Institute in Venezuela (1991), the Salamanca University, Spain, UCLA in California, USA (1992) and the University of Chile (1996).

== Musicologist ==
In 1979, at a request from UNESCO, he worked as adviser and analyst in events coordinated by the UNESCO-PNUD in Colombia. That same year, he participated as juror in the first Musicology Contest of Casa de Las Américas in Havana, Cuba.

Between 1988 and 1999, Orozco collaborated as musicologist with the Smithsonian Institution in Washington D.C., and also contributed to the LAMR magazine from the Austin University, in Texas. He worked as musical adviser for the Cultural Center in Santiago de Cuba and the Cuban Television Film Studios. Danilo Orozco served also as a member of the advisory committee for Instituto del Libro in Havana, Cuba.

His work titled Antología Integral del Son, a double CD based on a thorough musicological investigation about the origin of Son Cubano, is considered a landmark in Cuban musicological studies.

== Awards ==
In 1974, he received the Musicology National Award Pablo Hernández Balaguer, in the Analysis category, for his work titled: A propósito de la Nueva Trova.
