= Antonio Manganelli =

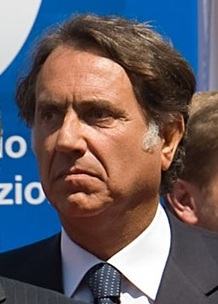
Manganelli in 2011

Antonio Manganelli (8 December 1950 – 20 March 2013) was an Italian police chief, and head of Polizia di Stato from June 2007, when he replaced Gianni De Gennaro.

Manganelli was born in Avellino. He graduated from Naples University and Modena University. Manganelli was close to Giovanni Falcone and Paolo Borsellino during the 1980s in a crime-fighting group. Manganelli's plans helped take down Sicilian Mafiosos, Nitto Santapaola and Giuseppe Lucchese, plus many other Sicilian criminals. In 1995, he was appointed as the chief of Palermo and Naples. He served as deputy chief of police in 2000 until he became the official chief of police. He died in Rome, aged 63.
