= Hemed Khamis =

Tanzanian politician

Hemed Khamis (died 28 March 2013) was a Tanzanian politician, who was MP for Pemba Island.

== Death ==
Khamis died of a stroke on 28 March 2013.
