= Desmond Drummer =

South African cricketer (1940–2013)

Personal information
- Born: 27 July 1940; Cape Town, South Africa
- Died: 19 March 2013 (aged 72); Cape Town, South Africa
- Source: ESPNcricinfo, 10 June 2016

Desmond Drummer (27 July 1940 – 19 March 2013) was a South African cricketer. He played seven first-class matches for Western Province between 1960 and 1964. He was born in Maitland, Cape Town, South Africa. He was right hand batsman and a right arm medium bowler.
