= José Luis Ortega Mata =

Mexican crime journalist and murder victim

- Born: 1964
- Died: 19 February 2001 (aged 37); Ojinaga, Chihuahua, Mexico
- Cause of death: Gunshot wounds
- Occupation: Journalist
- Organization: Semanario de Ojinaga
- Known for: Investigative journalism

José Luis Ortega Mata (1964 – 19 February 2001) was a Mexican journalist and director of the Semanario de Ojinaga, a weekly newspaper based in Ojinaga, Chihuahua in northern Mexico.

With fifteen years of experience as a journalist, Ortega Mata was known for publishing articles about organized crime, political and law enforcement corruption, and drug trafficking. On a February evening in 2001, an unknown gunman shot the journalist twice in the head and killed him. The crime remains unsolved; it is unknown if his assassination was a crime of passion or a reprisal for his work on the Mexican drug cartels.

== Early life and career ==
José Luis Ortega Mata was an editor and director of the Semanario de Ojinaga, a weekly newspaper from Ojinaga, Chihuahua in northern Mexico. Before working for this weekly, he was an editor for another newspaper known as Prensa Libre. With over fifteen years of experience as a journalist, Ortega Mata wrote about crime, corruption, and the local drug trade. He was the president-elect of the Ojinaga Association of Photographers and Cameramen.

His journalistic work encompassed a series of investigations where he denounced government officials, law enforcement, and businessmen that reportedly had ties with drug traffickers based in the northern part of the country. In his last work before being assassinated, Ortega Mata published an article about a drug investigation carried out by the Attorney General's Office (PGR) in Aldama, a town nearby Chihuahua, Chihuahua. The report mentioned how alleged drug traffickers moved narcotics to the United States by storing them in safe houses across Aldama and Ojinaga before smuggling them across the border.

=== Assassination ===
On the evening of 19 February 2001, Ortega Mata (aged 37) was shot twice on the head with a .22-caliber weapon from close distance in Ojinaga, Chihuahua, killing him on the scene. His bullet-ridden corpse was located by paramedics besides his minivan nearby his home. The motor of his vehicle, as well as its headlights, were on; his camera and wallet were left at the scene.

Family members and friends of him believe that the murder was carried out by an organized crime group as a reprisal for covering topics relating to drug trafficking, specifically for Ortega Mata's report on the drug investigations in a town of Chihuahua. Reportedly, the journalist had also been working on publishing an investigation alleging that drug kingpins in the area were financing local election campaigns for certain politicians.

On 29 April 2001 in Ojinaga, the Chihuahua state authorities arrested a Texas resident named Jesús Manuel Herrera, and charged him with the assassination of Ortega Mata based on a supposed eye-witness account. Many residents of the border city of Presidio, Texas, including its mayor, took the streets and blocked the Presidio–Ojinaga International Bridge as a sign of protest against the arrest. They argued that he had been used as a scapegoat to cover up the real assassin of Ortega Mata. Mr. Herrera proclaimed his innocence and said that he was falsely accused of the crime, but he remained in prison until all charges were dropped by a magistrate and was released on 13 July 2001. In a court hearing two months before, Mr. Herrera's lawyers proved to the magistrate that the person who testified against him was in prison when Ortega Mata died, and that the evidences to convict Mr. Herrera were "insufficient."

The assassination of Ortega Mata remains unpunished and unsolved; reports prior to his assassination indicate that he had received death threats for writing about corruption and the Mexican drug cartels. There are other reports that suggest that his murder may possibly be a crime of passion. According to the Committee to Protect Journalists, the suspected force behind Ortega Mata's assassination, however, is a Mexican organized crime group.

== Personal life and family ==
Ortega Mata was married to Alicia Cortés and had three kids. He also had two brothers: Toribio, a photographer; and Armando, who served as the director of Prensa Libre newspaper. When he was assassinated in 2001, his family left Ojinaga and emigrated to the United States.

== See also ==
- Mexican drug war
- List of journalists killed in Mexico

=== Bibliography ===
- Orozco, Víctor (2003). Chihuahua hoy: 2003 : Visiones de su historia, economía, política y cultura (in Spanish). Universidad Autónoma de Ciudad Juárez. p. 670. ISBN 9687845422.
- Wilson, Jason (2002). The Best American Travel Writing. Houghton Mifflin Harcourt. p. 351. ISBN 0618118802.
