= Alfredo De Gasperis =

Canadian businessman (1934–2013)

- Born: January 28, 1934; Sora, Lazio, Italy
- Died: March 27, 2013 (aged 79); Vaughan, Ontario, Canada
- Known for: Founder of Condrain
- Spouse: Teresa De Gasperis
- Children: Jim De Gasperis; Carla De Gasperis; Fred Jr. De Gasperis
- Parent(s): Attilio De Gasperis; Rosina De Gasperis
- Relatives: Angelo De Gasperis (brother); Antonio De Gasperis (brother)

Alfredo "Fred" De Gasperis (Italian: [alˈfreːdo de ˈɡasperis]; January 28, 1934 – March 27, 2013) was an Italian-Canadian billionaire developer, and contractor. He was the founder of Condrain, a sewer and watermain contractor based in Concord, Ontario, Canada, and Metrus Development, a development company based in Vaughan, Ontario. In 2012, his net worth was estimated at $1.41 billion.

== Early life ==
De Gasperis was born in Sora in the province of Frosinone, Lazio, Italy. He was the son of Attilio and Rosina De Gasperis. At the age of 18, he immigrated to Canada on a Greek passenger boat, arriving in Halifax, Nova Scotia at Pier 21 on May 3, 1952.

== Business career ==
In 1954, Alfredo De Gasperis, along with his brothers Angelo and Antonio, started his first business out of a bungalow in Toronto, named Condrain. During the 1960s, they worked on many projects installing water and sewer lines in the Niagara Region. In 1972, Alfredo and his brothers founded Metrus Developments Inc., and Metrus Properties Limited. The 1970s brought the development of the community of Erin Mills in the new City of Mississauga, and Condrain was selected by Cadillac Developments Ltd. to service their subdivisions. In 1983, Con-Drain construction became Condrain Company. Over the following decades, the companies founded by Alfredo continued to grow in size; his family-owned construction conglomerate, one of Canada's largest, employs 4,500 and grosses in the range of $1 billion a year.

In 2004, Alfredo and his son Jim bought Vineland Estates Winery.

== Philanthropy ==
In 2009, Alfredo De Gasperis received a Lifetime Achievement Award at the 29th annual Building Industry and Land Development Association (BILD) awards, for his impact as a contractor, developer, builder, and philanthropist. The BILD awards celebrate the best in design, construction, sales, and marketing in the building and development industry of the Greater Toronto Area. Alfredo De Gasperis was inducted into the Italian Walk of Fame in 2011, which pays tribute to achievements of Italians.

De Gasperis devoted much of his time to many different charities and organizations. In 2004, Alfredo and his brothers Antonio and Angelo donated $7 million to the Toronto General and Western Hospital Foundation. The DeGasperis Conservatory was established in the Toronto General Hospital's Peter Munk Cardiac Centre.

In the early 1970s, he was part of a group of Italian-Canadians who helped create an organization to assist seniors while preserving Italian culture and customs - North York's Villa Colombo. He also served as vice-chair of the Villa Charities Foundation board.

== Personal life ==
Alfredo De Gasperis died on March 27, 2013, at the age of 79. He was married to Teresa DiCarlo. They have three children, Jim, Carla and Fred Jr. De Gasperis. Singer Alessia De Gasperis, also billed under the mononym Kai, is his granddaughter.
