= Erich Pennekamp =

German water polo player

Personal information
- Nationality: German
- Born: 13 November 1929; Duisburg, Germany
- Died: 1 March 2013 (aged 83); Essen, Germany

Sport
- Sport: Water polo

Erich Pennekamp (13 November 1929 – 1 March 2013) was a German water polo player. He competed in the men's tournament at the 1956 Summer Olympics.
