= Henry Besant =

English businessman

Henry Besant (19 November 1972 – 14 March 2013) was an English mixologist and businessman who was influential in the spirits industry.

He started in the service industry at the age of 16. In 1993, he opened Mas Café in Notting Hill, which he ran for four years before becoming director and general manager of private members club, 57 Jermyn Street.

In 2003, Besant became the only venue manager to win back-to-back Time Out bar of the year awards when his new project, Lonsdale Bar, was the recipient of the 2004 gong.

Whilst working at Lonsdale, Henry formed Worldwide Cocktail Club with fellow bartender Dre Masso. Worldwide Cocktail Club was a drinks industry consultancy specializing in bartender training and education as well as some on-trade strategies for various beverage brands.

Besant was the co-creator of Olmeca Altos, a premium 100% agave tequila. Altos has won multiple awards including gold and silver medals at the 2012 San Francisco world spirit competition, 2011 Ultimate Cocktail Challenge (Winner), 2012 Drinks International Long Drink (Gold Medal) and 2012 Drinks International Supreme Champion (Best Overall Drink).

On 14 March 2013, Besant died following a heart attack on the London Underground two weeks earlier.

== See also ==
- Olmeca Tequila
