= George Sossenko =

- Born: December 20, 1918
- Died: March 14, 2013 (aged 94); Atlanta, Georgia, United States of America
- Military career
- Allegiance: Spanish Republic; Free France; United States of America
- Branch: Confederal militias International Brigades; United States Fifth Army
- Units: Durruti Column; The "Abraham Lincoln" XV International Brigade
- Conflicts: Spanish Civil War
- Website: http://www.sossenko.com/

George Sossenko (sometimes Georges Sossenko; December 20, 1918 – March 14, 2013) was a Russian-born American lecturer and activist. At age 17, he left his parents' home in Paris, France, to join those fighting against Francisco Franco's nationalist forces in the Spanish Civil War. He initially went to the offices of the French Communist Party, but was turned away, and then denied by the Socialists as well. They suggested he contact the anarchists, who sent him across the Spanish border in a caravan. He was sent to Barcelona, then received one week's worth of military training before being sent to the front. During the Civil War, Sossenko changed his name to Georges Jorat to avoid being found by his parents, and fought as part of the Sébastien Faure Century, the French-speaking contingent of the Durruti Column. He later joined the International Brigades. After the Civil War, Sossenko later fought in World War II with the Free French and with in United States Fifth Army in Italy.

Later on, Sossenko went to work for Michelin Tire as a mechanical engineer. He first worked in Texas, but was transferred to Atlanta, Georgia. In 1984, Sossenko sued Michelin (Sossenko v. Michelin Corp., 172 Ga. App. 71 (1984)) after being threatened with losing his job. He lived in Atlanta with his wife Bernice for the remainder of his life. In 2004, Sossenko published a Spanish-language book titled Aventurero Idealista.
