= UC Berkeley School of Social Welfare =

University of California, Berkeley School of Social Welfare
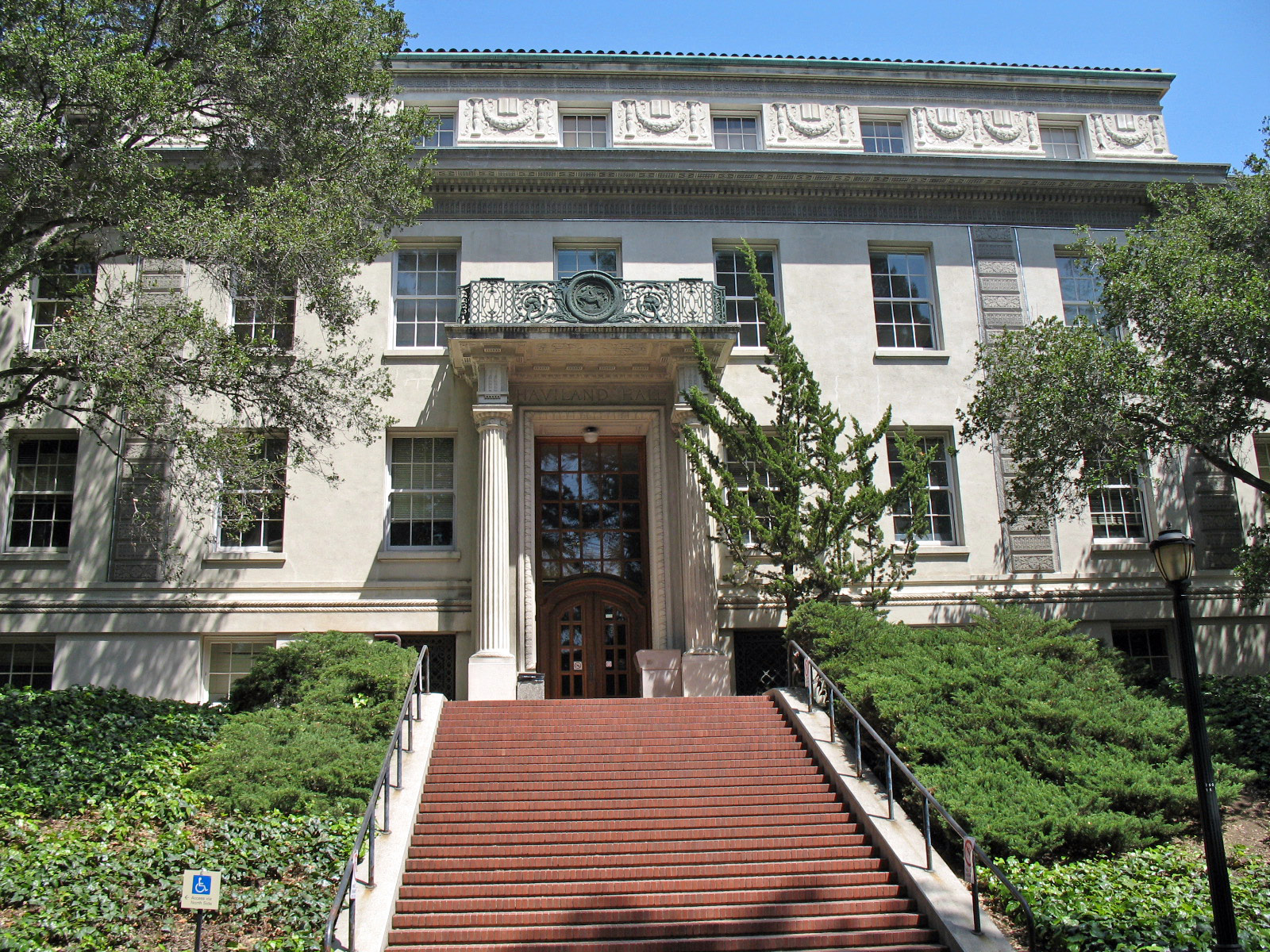
- Haviland Hall, headquarters of the School of Social Welfare
- Type: Public Professional School
- Established: June 1, 1944
- Parent institution: University of California, Berkeley
- Dean: Susan Stone
- Faculty: 36
- Postgraduates: 224
- Location: Berkeley, California, U.S. 37°52′25.4″N 122°15′39.84″W
- Website: socialwelfare.berkeley.edu

The School of Social Welfare of the University of California, Berkeley, was established June 1, 1944 and is located in Haviland Hall on the UC Berkeley campus. Its focus is to prepare graduates to become agents of social change through direct practice, agency management, policymaking, and leading new discoveries that address the grand challenges confronting society. Berkeley Social Welfare offers the Bachelor of Arts in Social Welfare through the College of Letters and Science (L&S), the M.S.W., and the Ph.D.

== History ==
Social welfare as a field of study was originally located in the Economics Department and was called "social economics".

Professor Jessica Blanche Peixotto, the second woman to earn at Ph.D. at Berkeley, was hired in 1904 to teach courses in sociology and by 1912 had shaped a curriculum in social economics focused on the poor. Peixotto became the first woman at Berkeley to achieve tenured faculty status in 1918. Along with her colleagues, Lucy Ward Stebbins and Emily Noble Plehn, they developed a graduate-level curriculum in social work that same year.

By 1927 these courses led to certificates in child and family services and in medical social work. An independent Department of Social Welfare was established in 1939 and the certificates were replaced with a professional Master of Arts degree in 1942. Professor Harry Cassidy, the Public Welfare Director for British Columbia became the first Dean of the new School of Social Welfare in 1944. He insisted the program be called "social welfare" to encompass more than social work.

== Students ==
Undergraduates majoring in social welfare are enrolled in the College of Letters and Science (L&S), while the upper-division major is administered by the School of Social Welfare. Social welfare is an undergraduate major in L&S.

There are approximately 27 doctoral and 197 master's students in the School. At the graduate level, Berkeley Social Welfare offers: a full-time, two year M.S.W. program; a part-time, three year M.S.W. program; a part-time, advanced standing, one year M.S.W. program; a concurrent, three year M.S.W./M.P.H. program; a concurrent, three year M.S.W./M.P.P. program; a concurrent, four year M.S.W/J.D. program; a combined M.S.W./Ph.D. program, and a Ph.D. program.

The School of Social Welfare maintains these research units:

- The California Child Welfare Indicators Project
- The Digital Health & Access Equity Lab
- Risk Resilience Research Lab
- The Sexual Health & Reproductive Equity Program
- The Center for the Advanced Study of Aging Services
- The Center for Comparative Family Welfare and Poverty Research
- The Mack Center on Nonprofit & Public Sector Management
- The Mental Health and Social Welfare Research Group

== Rankings and reputation ==
As of 2024, it is ranked tied for 4th out of 319 schools for social work in the United States by U.S. News & World Report.

== See also ==
List of social work schools
