= Deaths in April 2013 =

The following is a list of notable deaths in April 2013.

Entries for each day are listed alphabetically by surname. A typical entry lists information in the following sequence:

- Name, age, country of citizenship and reason for notability, established cause of death, reference.

== April 2013 ==
=== 1 ===
- Badr bin Abdulaziz Al Saud, 81, Saudi royal.
- Marjorie Anthony Linden, 77, Canadian television producer and media executive.
- Asal Badiee, 35, Iranian actress, complications from a drug overdose.
- Moses Blah, 65, Liberian politician, President (2003).
- David Burge, 83, American pianist, complications from a heart attack.
- Chen Zhaodi, 57, Chinese volleyball player (national women's team) and general, cancer.
- Kildare Dobbs, 89, Indian-born Canadian short-story and travel writer, multiple organ failure.
- John Don, 94, Australian politician, member of the Victorian Legislative Assembly for Elsternwick.
- Peter Drewett, 64, English archaeologist.
- Norm Gigon, 74, American baseball player (Chicago Cubs).
- William H. Ginsburg, 70, American lawyer (Lewinsky scandal), cancer.
- Eskild Jensen, 87, Norwegian politician.
- Barbara Piasecka Johnson, 76, Polish-born American art collector and philanthropist.
- Nicolae Martinescu, 73, Romanian Olympic champion wrestler (1972).
- Anthony Montague Browne, 89, British diplomat.
- Karen Muir, 60, South African swimmer (youngest sporting world record holder) and physician, breast cancer.
- Jack Pardee, 76, American football player (Los Angeles Rams) and coach (Houston Oilers, Chicago Bears, Washington Redskins), complications from gall bladder cancer.
- Pavel 183, 29, Russian street artist.
- Bob Smith, 82, American baseball player (Boston Red Sox).
- Alexej Stachowitsch, 94, Austrian-Russian author, pedagogue and songwriter.
- Greg Willard, 54, American basketball referee, pancreatic cancer.

=== 2 ===
- Maysara Abu Hamdiya, 64, Palestinian general, cancer.
- Chuck Fairbanks, 79, American football coach (New England Patriots, University of Oklahoma), brain cancer.
- Jesús Franco, 82, Spanish film director and screenwriter (Count Dracula), complications from a stroke.
- Fred, 82, French cartoonist.
- Kurt Hellmann, 90, British pharmacologist.
- Jane Henson, 78, American puppeteer, co-founder of The Muppets, cancer.
- Ted James, 88, English cricket player (Sussex).
- Ibrahim Zeid Keilani, 76, Jordanian politician, Minister of Awqaf and Islamic Affairs; Member of the House of Representatives (1993–1997).
- Adrian Leftwich, 72–73, South African political activist, lung cancer.
- Jim T. Lindsey, 87, American politician, member of the Texas House of Representatives (1949–1957); Speaker (1955–1957).
- Johnny Lunde, 89, Norwegian Olympic alpine skier.
- Duke Kimbrough McCall, 98, American Christian activist and leader.
- Barry Mealand, 70, English footballer (Fulham).
- Milo O'Shea, 86, Irish actor (Mass Appeal, Ulysses, Theatre of Blood).
- Mariano Pulido, 56, Spanish footballer and manager (Sevilla FC), degenerative disease.
- Benjamin Purcell, 85, American military officer and politician, highest ranking POW during the Vietnam War, member of Georgia House (1993–1997), natural causes.
- Willem P. C. Stemmer, 56, Dutch scientist, cancer.
- Twilight Ridge, 30, American Thoroughbred racing filly.
- Linda Vogt, 90, Australian flautist.
- Othniel Wienges, 88, American politician and horse breeder, member of the South Carolina House of Representatives (1962–1972).
- Ian Wilson, 80, Australian politician, Minister for Home Affairs and the Environment (1981–1982) and Aboriginal Affairs (1982–1983); MP for Sturt (1966–1969; 1972–1993).

=== 3 ===
- Mariví Bilbao, 83, Spanish actress (La que se avecina, Aquí no hay quien viva), natural causes.
- Fergy Brown, 90, Scottish-born Canadian politician, Mayor of York (1988–1994).
- Ralph Brown, 85, British sculptor.
- Kiki Byrne, 75, Norwegian-born British fashion designer.
- Basil Copper, 89, British writer, complications from Alzheimer's disease.
- Cornelius the First, black rhinoceros, Canadian politician, pneumonia.
- Georges Corvington, 86, Haitian historian, heart failure.
- Eugene Crum, 59, American sheriff (Mingo County, West Virginia), shot.
- Gloria de Souza, 75, Indian educator.
- Robert Elgie, 84, Canadian politician, MPP for York East (1977–1985), heart failure.
- Douglas Freeman, 96, English cricketer.
- George Gladir, 87, American comic book writer (Archie, Sabrina the Teenage Witch).
- Mazharul Haque, 32, Bangladeshi cricketer, heart attack.
- Harry J, 67, Jamaican music producer, studio owner and musician, diabetes.
- Stan Isaacs, 83, American sports columnist.
- Ruth Prawer Jhabvala, 85, German-born British-American novelist and screenwriter (A Room with a View, Howards End), Booker Prize winner (1975), pulmonary failure.
- Juanito, 64, Spanish footballer (UD Salamanca).
- Graham Lea, 79, Canadian broadcaster and politician, British Columbia MLA for Prince Rupert (1972–1984).
- Farouk Abdel Wahab Mustafa, 70, Egyptian translator.
- Herman van Raalte, 91, Dutch international footballer.
- Jan Remmers, 90, Dutch football coach.
- Jean Sincere, 93, American actress (Glee, Roxanne, The Incredibles).
- Dorothy Taubman, 95, American music teacher.
- Robert Ward, 95, American composer (The Crucible), Pulitzer Prize winner (1962).

=== 4 ===
- Rehavam Amir, 97, Israeli diplomat.
- Chris Bailey, 62, Australian bass guitarist and vocalist, throat cancer.
- Harry Birkhead, South African philatelist.
- Dale Bisnauth, 76, Guyanese politician and academic, heart attack.
- Bengt Blomgren, 89, Swedish actor and director, prostate cancer.
- Brian's Time, 28, American Thoroughbred racehorse, euthanized.
- Víctor Carranza, 77, Colombian emerald businessman, lung and prostate cancer.
- Roger Ebert, 70, American film critic (Chicago Sun-Times, Siskel & Ebert), Pulitzer Prize winner (1975), thyroid cancer.
- Carmine Infantino, 87, American comic book artist (Batman, Green Lantern, Human Target) and editor.
- Besedka Johnson, 87, American actress (Starlet).
- Osmo Karjalainen, 73, Finnish Olympic skier.
- Stephen Macknowski, 91, American sprint canoeist.
- Beatrice Palner, 75, Danish actress.
- Joseph Pease, 3rd Baron Gainford, 91, British aristocrat.
- Apidej Sit-Hirun, 72, Thai martial artist (Muay Thai), lung cancer.
- Cory L. Richards, 64, American reproductive health activist, pancreatic cancer.
- Eldred G. Smith, 106, American patriarch emeritus of the Church of Jesus Christ of Latter-day Saints.
- Tommy Tycho, 84, Hungarian-born Australian composer, arranger and orchestra conductor, complications following a stroke.
- Ian Walsh, 80, Australian rugby league player, captain of St. George Dragons and national team.
- Noboru Yamaguchi, 41, Japanese author (The Familiar of Zero), cancer.

=== 5 ===
- Curt Berklund, 83, American administrator.
- Regina Bianchi, 92, Italian stage and film actress (The Four Days of Naples), natural causes.
- Amnon Dankner, 67, Israeli newspaper editor (Maariv) and journalist, heart attack.
- Piero de Palma, 87, Italian opera singer.
- James Dickens, 82, British politician MP for Lewisham West (1966–1970).
- Albert J. Engel Jr., 89, American judge, member of US Court of Appeals for the Sixth Circuit (since 1973).
- David Hunt, 87, American Christian apologist and author, natural causes.
- Mohammad Ishaq Khan, 67, Indian historian, heart failure.
- David Kuo, 44, American author and civil servant, brain cancer.
- I.R.A. MacCallum, 82, British solicitor and politician in Hong Kong.
- Peter Maxwell, 92, Austrian-born British film and television director (A Country Practice).
- Nikolaos Pappas, 83, Greek Navy officer, leader of the 1973 mutiny against the military junta, cancer.
- Bill Stephen, 91, Australian politician, member of the Victorian Legislative Assembly for Ballarat South (1964–1979).

=== 6 ===
- George Anania, 71, Romanian science-fiction writer and translator.
- Dame Hilda Bynoe, 91, Grenadian politician, Governor (1968–1974).
- Mizanur Rahman Chowdhury (Jamaat-e-Islami politician), Bangladeshi politician.
- Veljko Despotović, 81, Serbian production designer.
- Cid Edwards, 69, American football player.
- Johnny Esaw, 87, Canadian sports broadcaster, pulmonary failure.
- Matt Gilsenan, 97, Irish Gaelic football player.
- Bill Guttridge, 82, English footballer (Walsall F.C.), Parkinson's disease and pneumonia.
- Bigas Luna, 67, Spanish film director (Anguish, Yo soy la Juani), leukemia.
- Michael Norgrove, 31, Zambian-born British boxer, cerebral bleeding.
- Funmilayo Olayinka, 52, Nigerian politician, cancer.
- Miguel Poblet, 85, Spanish racing cyclist, kidney failure.
- Alan Protheroe, 79, British television executive.
- Ottmar Schreiner, 67, German politician, MP for Saarlouis (since 1980), cancer.
- Don Shirley, 86, American pianist.
- Anne Smedinghoff, 25, American diplomat, bombing.
- Adriaan van Veldhuizen, 81, Dutch politician, member of the Senate (1977–1995).
- Herbert Werner, 92, German Navy U-boat officer.
- Celso Yegros Estigarribia, 77, Paraguayan Roman Catholic prelate, Bishop of Carapeguá (1983–2010), complications of Parkinson's disease.

=== 7 ===
- Marty Blake, 86, American basketball executive, GM of Atlanta Hawks (1954–1970), NBA Director of Scouting (1976–2011).
- Les Blank, 77, American documentary filmmaker (Werner Herzog Eats His Shoe, Burden of Dreams), bladder cancer.
- Vernal Charles, 27, South African cricketer, traffic collision.
- Gan Eng Teck, 79, Singaporean Olympic water polo player.
- Richard Grand, 83, American lawyer.
- Michel Hénon, 82, French mathematician and astronomer.
- Hans Jäcker, 80, German footballer (Eintracht Braunschweig).
- Andy Johns, 62, British record producer (Led Zeppelin, The Rolling Stones), bleeding from stomach ulcer.
- Wann Langston Jr., 91, American paleontologist.
- Ijaz Mirza, 71, Pakistani cricketer.
- Sir Kenneth Murray, 82, British biologist.
- Lilly Pulitzer, 81, American fashion designer.
- Mickey Rose, 77, American screenwriter (Bananas) and television writer (All in the Family, The Odd Couple), colon cancer.
- Betty Rusynyk, 88, American baseball player.
- Yusuf Warsame Saeed, Somali politician.
- John St Aubyn, 4th Baron St Levan, 94, British aristocrat and naval officer.
- Carl Williams, 53, American boxer, esophageal cancer.

=== 8 ===
- Abd al-Hadi al-Fadli, 78, Iraqi writer and academic.
- Mikhail Beketov, 55, Russian journalist and activist, heart failure.
- Leslie Broderick, 91, British military officer, one of the last three survivors of "The Great Escape".
- Richard Brooker, 58, British actor and stuntman (Friday the 13th Part III, Deathstalker), heart attack.
- Gene Campbell, 80, American Olympic ice hockey player (1956).
- Alain de Weck, 84, Swiss immunologist.
- Waldemar Esteves da Cunha, 92, Brazilian carnival king, respiratory failure and Alzheimer's disease.
- Annette Funicello, 70, American actress (The Mickey Mouse Club) and singer ("Tall Paul"), complications from multiple sclerosis.
- Katharine Giles, 35, British climate scientist, cycling accident.
- Patrick Kankiriho, 52, Ugandan military officer.
- Greg Kramer, 51, British-born Canadian actor (300, On the Road, Arthur) and author.
- François-Wolff Ligondé, 85, Haitian Roman Catholic prelate, Archbishop of Port-au-Prince (1966–2008), complications of heart disease and diabetes.
- Sara Montiel, 85, Spanish actress and singer, cardiac arrest.
- Anne Fitzalan-Howard, Duchess of Norfolk, 85, British peeress and charity worker.
- Tommy Molloy, 79, British boxer, heart attack.
- Pepe Ozan, 73, Argentine sculptor and artistic director.
- Frank Panton, 89, British military scientist.
- Peter Reveen, 77, Australian-born American stage hypnotist and illusionist, complications of diabetes and dementia.
- William Royer, 92, American politician, member of the U.S. House of Representatives from California (1979–1981).
- José Luis Sampedro, 96, Spanish writer and economist, natural causes.
- Franco Biondi Santi, 91, Italian winemaker.
- J. F. A. Soza, 94, Sri Lankan judge, member of the Supreme Court.
- Margaret Thatcher, Baroness Thatcher, 87, British stateswoman, prime minister (1979–1990), MP (1959–1992) and member of the House of Lords (since 1992), stroke.
- Marian Robertson Wilson, 86, American musician.
- Yasuhiro Yamada, 45, Japanese footballer, liver cancer.

=== 9 ===
- Desmond Hamill, 76, British television news reporter.
- David Hayes, 82, American sculptor, leukemia.
- Lynn Lundquist, 78, American politician, member (1994–1998) and Speaker of the Oregon House of Representatives (1997–1998).
- Jim McAllister, 68, Northern Irish politician, cancer.
- Greg McCrary, 61, American football player (Atlanta Falcons, San Diego Chargers, Washington Redskins), cardiac arrest.
- Mordechai Mishani, 67, Israeli politician, Member of Knesset (2001–2003).
- Luis Antonio Nova Rocha, 69, Colombian Roman Catholic prelate, Auxiliary Bishop of Barranquilla (2002–2010), Bishop of Facatativá (since 2010), heart attack.
- Ronald Osborne, 66, British-born Canadian businessman, Chairman of Postmedia Network (since 2010), Sun Life Financial (2005–2010), CEO of Maclean-Hunter (1986–1994).
- Emilio Pericoli, 85, Italian singer.
- McCandlish Phillips, 85, American journalist (The New York Times).
- Paolo Soleri, 93, Italian architect, natural causes.
- Zao Wou-Ki, 93, Chinese-born French artist.

=== 10 ===
- Lorenzo Antonetti, 90, Italian Roman Catholic prelate, Cardinal of Sant'Agnese in Agone (since 1998), Apostolic Nuncio to France (1988–1995).
- Binod Bihari Chowdhury, 102, Bangladeshi activist for Indian independence.
- Raymond Boudon, 79, French academic.
- Jimmy Dawkins, 76, American blues musician.
- Sir Robert Edwards, 87, British physiologist, Nobel Prize laureate (2010).
- Alexandru Fronea, 79, Romanian footballer.
- Akhsarbek Galazov, 83, Russian scientist and politician, President of North Ossetia–Alania (1994–1998).
- Dick Hart, 77, American golfer.
- George Hunter, 92, Canadian documentary photographer.
- Jan Jaworowski, 85, Polish and American mathematician.
- Aleksandar Kozlina, 74, Yugoslav footballer.
- Olive Lewin, 85, Jamaican social anthropologist and musicologist.
- Robert Hugh McWilliams Jr., 96, American judge, US Court of Appeals – Tenth Circuit (1970–1984), Colorado Supreme Court (1961–1970).
- Bernhard Rieger, 90, German Roman Catholic prelate, Auxiliary Bishop of Rottenburg-Stuttgart (1985–1996).
- Enrique Ros, 89, Cuban historian and activist, respiratory complications.
- Gordon Thomas, 91, British Olympic silver-medal cyclist (1948), winner of the Tour of Britain (1953).
- Lafe Ward, 87, American politician, member of the West Virginia Senate (1971–1983).
- Don Williams, 70, American poker player.
- Andrei Zelevinsky, 60, Russian mathematician.

=== 11 ===
- Don Blackman, 59, American jazz-funk pianist, singer and songwriter, cancer.
- Edward de Grazia, 86, American lawyer and writer (Girls Lean Back Everywhere).
- Sue Draheim, 63, American fiddler, cancer.
- Edward A. Frieman, 87, American physicist and national policy advisor, respiratory illness.
- Adam Galos, 88, Polish historian.
- Sidney Goodman, 77, American figurative painter and draftsman.
- Grady Hatton, 90, American baseball player (Cincinnati Reds) and manager (Houston Astros), natural causes.
- Thomas Hemsley, 85, English opera singer.
- Igor, 30, walrus, euthanized.
- Fakhrul Islam, 46, Pakistani politician, shot.
- Shorty Jenkins, 77, Canadian curling icemaker.
- Ram Karmi, 82, Israeli architect, winner of the Israel Prize (2002).
- Hilary Koprowski, 96, Polish-born American virologist and immunologist, invented first effective live polio vaccine, pneumonia.
- César Madelón, 85, Argentine Olympic equestrian.
- Zachariah Alpheus Mahlomola Molotsi, 60, South African politician.
- Stephen Mallinga, 69, Ugandan politician and physician.
- Errol Mann, 71, American football player (Oakland Raiders, Detroit Lions), heart attack.
- Gilles Marchal, 68, French songwriter and singer.
- Michael Gough Matthews, 81, British pianist, teacher and musical administrator.
- Bernard McGlinchey, 80, Irish businessman and politician, Senator (1961–1981).
- David O'Halloran, 57, Australian football player (Hawthorn), heart attack.
- Maudelle Shirek, 101, American politician, Vice Mayor of Berkeley, California.
- Maria Tallchief, 88, American prima ballerina.
- Clorindo Testa, 89, Italian-born Argentine architect and artist.
- Fausto Valdiviezo, 52, Ecuadorian journalist, reporter and television presenter, shot.
- Angela Voigt, 61, East German Olympic champion long jumper (1976).
- Jonathan Winters, 87, American comedian and actor (It's a Mad, Mad, Mad, Mad World, Mork & Mindy, The Smurfs), Emmy winner (1991).

=== 12 ===
- Sir John Burgh, 87, Austrian-born British civil servant, Director-General of the British Council (1980–1987).
- Robert Byrne, 84, American chess grandmaster and columnist (The New York Times), Parkinson's disease.
- Roger Dobson, 58, British writer.
- Johnny du Plooy, 48, South African heavyweight boxer, heart failure.
- Michael France, 51, American screenwriter (GoldenEye, The Punisher, Hulk), complications from diabetes.
- Marv Harshman, 95, American basketball coach (University of Washington, Washington State University), Member of the Naismith Memorial Basketball Hall of Fame.
- Erwin Hymer, 82, German businessman, founder of Hymer.
- Dennis John, 78, Welsh footballer.
- Fred Lovegrove, 73, American politician, member of the Connecticut Senate (1982–1998).
- Brennan Manning, 78, American priest and author.
- Terry McCabe, 67, American golf club designer.
- Oöphoi, 55, Italian ambient musician.
- Stefan Stoykov, 75, Bulgarian Olympic basketball player.
- Annamária Szalai, 51, Hungarian politician and journalist, MP for Zala County (1998–2004), President of National Media and Infocommunications Authority (since 2010).
- William Y. Thompson, 90, American historian.
- Frosty Westering, 85, American football coach, member of the College Football Hall of Fame, coached four national champions.
- Ya'akov Yosef, 66, Israeli rabbi and politician, cancer.

=== 13 ===
- Frank Bank, 71, American actor (Leave It to Beaver), cancer.
- Chi Cheng, 42, American bassist (Deftones), cardiac arrest.
- Stephen Dodgson, 89, British composer.
- Dean Drummond, 64, American composer, musician (Newband) and instrument inventor, multiple myeloma.
- Ian Henderson, 86, British colonial police officer.
- Adolph Herseth, 91, American trumpet player (Chicago Symphony Orchestra).
- Abdelhamid Kermali, 81, Algerian football player and coach.
- Lin Yang-kang, 85, Taiwanese politician, Mayor of Taipei (1976–1978), Governor of Taiwan Province (1978–1981), President of Judicial Yuan (1987–1994), multiple organ failure.
- Vincent Montana Jr., 85, American composer, arranger, and percussionist (MFSB, Salsoul Orchestra).
- Hilmar Myhra, 97, Norwegian ski jumper.
- Henk Peeters, 87, Dutch artist.
- Bob J. Perry, 80, American real estate magnate.
- Nick Pollotta, 57, American science fiction author, cancer.
- Edwin G. Pulleyblank, 90, Canadian sinologist and linguist.
- William Steck, 79, American violinist (National Symphony Orchestra), respiratory failure.
- Jadene Felina Stevens, 65–66, American poet, cancer.
- Don Syme, 91, Australian local politician and communist activist.
- Levi Ying, 64, Taiwanese-American politician, MLY (1999–2002).

=== 14 ===
- Efi Arazi, 76, Israeli businessman.
- Donald Burkholder, 86, American mathematician.
- Sir Colin Davis, 85, British conductor, President of the London Symphony Orchestra.
- Jaime Enrique Duque Correa, 70, Colombian Roman Catholic prelate, Bishop of El Banco (since 2006).
- R. P. Goenka, 83, Indian businessman, founder of the RPG Group, cancer.
- A. S. A. Harrison, 65, Canadian writer and artist, cancer.
- Tom Huff, 80, American politician, member of the Washington House of Representatives (1995–2000), pulmonary fibrosis.
- Stanislav Hurenko, 76, Ukrainian Soviet politician, last First Secretary of the Communist Party of the Ukrainian SSR (1990–1991), cancer.
- George Jackson, 68, American singer-songwriter ("Old Time Rock and Roll", "One Bad Apple"), cancer.
- Rentarō Mikuni, 90, Japanese actor (Rikyu) and director, cardiac failure.
- Dennis Moran, 30, American computer criminal, heroin overdose.
- H. Burke Peterson, 89, American Member of the Presiding Bishopric of the Church of Jesus Christ of Latter-day Saints.
- John S. Ragin, 83, American actor (Quincy, M.E., The Parallax View, Earthquake).
- Makame Rashidi, 69, Tanzanian military officer and diplomat, Ambassador to Malawi, leader of Tanzania People's Defence Force (1989–2001).
- Mike Road, 95, American actor (Jonny Quest, Space Ghost).
- P. B. Sreenivas, 82, Indian singer, heart attack.
- Seth Taft, 90, American politician.
- Stanko Topolčnik, 65, Slovenian Olympic judoka.
- Alberto Valdés, 94, Mexican Olympic champion equestrian (1948).
- Armando Villanueva, 97, Peruvian politician, Prime Minister (1988–1989).
- Christine White, 86, American actress (Magnum Force, Perry Mason, The Twilight Zone).
- Charlie Wilson, 70, American politician, member of the US House (2007–2011), Ohio House (1997–2005) and Ohio Senate (2005–2007), complications of a stroke.

=== 15 ===
- Sal Castro, 79, American community activist and teacher, thyroid cancer.
- Benny Frankie Cerezo, 70, Puerto Rican politician.
- Richard Collins, 65, Canadian actor (Trailer Park Boys), heart attack.
- Danny Dahill, 93, American politician, member of the West Virginia House of Delegates (1957–1960), West Virginia Senate (1961–1964).
- Muhammad Fazal Karim, 58, Pakistani politician, liver failure.
- Benjamin Fain, 83, Ukrainian-born Israeli physicist and refusenik.
- Joe Francis, 76, American football player (Green Bay Packers, Montreal Alouettes).
- Richard LeParmentier, 66, American actor (Star Wars, Who Framed Roger Rabbit, Octopussy).
- Dave McArtney, 62, New Zealand musician (Hello Sailor), cancer.
- Scott Miller, 53, American singer-songwriter and musician (Game Theory, Loud Family), suicide.
- Jean-François Paillard, 85, French classical conductor.
- Robert Perloff, 92, American psychologist and academic.
- Zastrow Simms, 78, American civil rights activist.
- Cleyde Yáconis, 89, Brazilian film, stage and television actress, ischemia.

=== 16 ===
- Horst Bittner, 85, East German politician.
- Charles Bruzon, 74, British Gibraltarian politician, MP (since 2003).
- Halka Chronic, 90, American geologist.
- William D. Curry, 87, United States Air Force officer.
- Jack Daniels, 85, American baseball player (Boston Braves).
- George Horse Capture, 75, American Gros Ventre author, archivist and curator (Plains Indian Museum, National Museum of the American Indian), kidney failure.
- Frances K. Graham, 94–95, American psychologist.
- Gérard Jaquet, 97, French politician.
- Ali Kafi, 84, Algerian politician, Chairman of the High Council of State (1992–1994).
- Bob Kahler, 96, American football player (Green Bay Packers) and coach (Northern Illinois Huskies).
- Helmut Kasimier, 86, German politician, Finance Minister of Lower Saxony (1974–1976).
- Lloyd Koch, 81, South African cricketer.
- Francis Leo Lawrence, 75, American educator and French literature scholar, President of Rutgers University (1990–2002).
- Reinhard Lettmann, 80, German Roman Catholic prelate, Bishop of Münster (1980–2008).
- Siegfried Ludwig, 87, Austrian politician, Governor of Lower Austria (1981–1992).
- Pentti Lund, 87, Finnish-born Canadian ice hockey player (New York Rangers, Boston Bruins).
- Rita MacNeil, 68, Canadian Juno Award-winning singer and variety show host, complications from surgery.
- Gumersindo Magaña, 75, Mexican politician.
- Srifa Mahawan, 83, Thai writer.
- Ernle Money, 82, English politician, MP for Ipswich (1970–1974).
- Martinus Petrus Maria Muskens, 77, Dutch Roman Catholic prelate, Bishop of Breda (1994–2007).
- Robert W. Olson, 92, American Seventh-day Adventist leader, director of the Ellen G. White Estate (1978–1990).
- Joseph F. Rychlak, 84, American psychologist.
- Klaus Schulze, 85, German rower.
- George Beverly Shea, 104, Canadian-born American gospel music singer, complications from a stroke.
- Edwin Shirley, 64, English rock tour organiser and film studio manager, cancer.
- Pat Summerall, 82, American football player (New York Giants) and broadcaster (NFL on CBS, NFL on FOX), cardiac arrest.
- Pedro Ramírez Vázquez, 94, Mexican architect, pneumonia.
- Murray Vernon, 76, Australian cricketer (Western Australia).
- Bob Yates, 74, American football player.

=== 17 ===
- K.P. Bhaskar, 88, Indian classical dance pioneer, heart ailment.
- Sita Chan, 26, Hong Kong pop singer, traffic collision.
- Paul Dan Cristea, 72, Romanian professor of engineering.
- Deanna Durbin, 91, Canadian singer and actress (Three Smart Girls).
- Gerino Gerini, 84, Italian racing driver.
- Bernard Gilmore, 75, American composer, conductor and academic, Alzheimer's disease.
- Carlos Graça, 82, São Toméan politician, Prime Minister (1994–1995).
- Tony Harper, 74, Bermudian Olympic sprinter.
- Kauko Kangasniemi, 70, Finnish Olympic weightlifter and world record holder.
- Bi Kidude, c. 100, Tanzanian Zanzibari Taarab singer.
- Gerald W. Lynch, 76, American academic, President of John Jay College of Criminal Justice (1976–2004).
- Peter Mackay, 86, British journalist and political activist in Zimbabwe, Malawi and Tanzania.
- John Maitland Moir, 88, Scottish priest.
- Emilio Massino, 87, Italian sailor (sport).
- Albert Messiah, 91, French physicist.
- Yngve Moe, 55, Norwegian bass guitarist (Dance with a Stranger), drowning.
- V. S. Ramadevi, 79, Indian politician, Governor of Karnataka (1999–2002), Governor of Himachal Pradesh (1997–1999), cardiac arrest.
- T. K. Ramamoorthy, 91, Indian composer and violinist.
- Dariush Safvat, 85, Iranian musician, natural causes.
- Paul Ware, 42, English footballer, brain tumour.
- Stan Vickers, 80, British Olympic bronze medallist long-distance walker (1960).
- Ella Waldek, 83, American professional wrestler.
- Wubong, 62, Polish Zen master.
- Viktor Zhivov, 68, Russian philologist.

=== 18 ===
- Serkan Acar, 64, Turkish football player (Fenerbahçe).
- Donald Chapman, 89, British politician, MP for Birmingham Northfield (1951–1970).
- Peter Michael Chenaparampil, 83, Indian Roman Catholic prelate, Bishop of Alleppey (1984–2001).
- Estella B. Diggs, 96, American politician, member of the New York State Assembly (1972–1980).
- Ilona Edelsheim-Gyulai, 95, Hungarian noblewoman.
- Mikiel Fsadni, 97, Maltese friar and historian.
- Leopold Gernhardt, 93, Austrian footballer (SK Rapid Wien).
- Dorothy Gordon, 89, British actress.
- Aisea Katonivere, Fijian politician and chief.
- Augustine Lopez, 78, American politician, Chairman of the Tohono O'odham Nation (1971–1973).
- Cordell Mosson, 60, American bassist (Parliament-Funkadelic), liver failure.
- Maire Österdahl, 86, Finnish Olympic sprinter.
- Robert W. Peterson, 84, American politician, member of the North Dakota House of Representatives (1967–1972), North Dakota State Auditor (1973–1996).
- Jack Price, 94, English footballer (Hartlepool United).
- Sir Steuart Pringle, 84, British Royal Marines lieutenant general.
- Lex Redelé, 74, Dutch Olympic rower.
- Vytautas Šapranauskas, 54, Lithuanian actor, suicide.
- Elisabeth Scherer, 98, German actress.
- Goran Švob, 65, Croatian philosopher and author.
- Storm Thorgerson, 69, British graphic designer and album cover artist (Pink Floyd, Led Zeppelin, Muse), cancer.
- Hans-Joachim Walde, 70, German Olympic medal-winning (1964, 1968) decathlete.
- Anne Williams, 62, British activist (Hillsborough disaster), bowel cancer.
- Alan Wood, 90, American Navy officer, supplied the American flag for the Raising the Flag on Iwo Jima photograph, heart failure.
- Gráinne Yeats, 88, Irish harpist and singer.

=== 19 ===
- Aharon ben Ab-Chisda ben Yaacob, 86, Palestinian religious leader, Samaritan High Priest.
- Sivanthi Adithan, 76, Indian newspaper owner (Dina Thanthi).
- Kenneth Appel, 80, American mathematician, solved the four color theorem, esophageal cancer.
- Allan Arbus, 95, American actor (M*A*S*H, Coffy, Putney Swope), heart failure.
- Clive Best, 82, British rugby league player (Barrow).
- Leo Branton Jr., 91, American lawyer.
- Mike Denness, 72, Scottish cricketer, captain of Kent (1972–1976) and England (1974–1975), cancer.
- Lynne Duke, 56, American journalist (The Washington Post) and author, lung cancer.
- Patrick Garland, 78, English theatre director, actor and writer, cancer.
- Aishah Ghani, 90, Malaysian politician, natural causes.
- Alicia Gladden, 27, American basketball player, traffic collision.
- Kurt Hector, 41, Dominican international football manager, traffic collision.
- Robert Holding, 86, American billionaire businessman (Sinclair Oil, Grand America Hotels & Resorts).
- François Jacob, 92, French biologist, Nobel Prize (1965).
- Saleh Jerbo, 36, Sudanese rebel leader and alleged war criminal, military action.
- Thomas Joseph Kelly, 93, American horse trainer (Plugged Nickle), member of National Museum of Racing and Hall of Fame (1993).
- Bill Knott, 92, Australian politician, member of the New South Wales Legislative Assembly (1978–1986).
- E. L. Konigsburg, 83, American children's novelist and illustrator (From the Mixed-Up Files of Mrs. Basil E. Frankweiler), Newbery Medal (1968, 1997), stroke complications.
- C. Kuppusami, 86, Indian politician, MP for Chennai North (1998–2009).
- Palle Lykke, 76, Danish Olympic racing cyclist.
- Cortright McMeel, 41, American novelist.
- Al Neuharth, 89, American newspaper businessman, columnist and author, founder of USA Today, complications of injuries from a fall.
- Maurice Quentin, 92, French racing cyclist.
- Tamerlan Tsarnaev, 26, Russian suspect in the Boston Marathon bombings, shot and blunt force trauma.
- Hilda Walterová, 98, Czech Olympic alpine skier.
- John Willson, 81, British diplomat.

=== 20 ===
- Eleanor R. Adair, 86, American scientist.
- Hassan Alavikia, 102, Iranian spy chief.
- Günseli Başar, 81, Turkish beauty pageant winner, Miss Europe (1952).
- Victoria Blyth Hill, 67, American art conservator.
- Glenn Cannon, 80, American actor (Hawaii Five-O, Magnum P.I., Combat!).
- Amin Ahmed Chowdhury, 67, Bangladeshi army officer and diplomat, heart attack.
- Peter Kane Dufault, 89, American poet.
- Peter Garrisson, 90, Australian politician, member of the Victorian Legislative Assembly for Hawthorn (1958–1964).
- Quinton Hoover, 49, American artist and trading card illustrator (Magic: The Gathering).
- Huang Wenyong, 60, Malaysian-born Singaporean actor, lymphoma.
- Jocasta Innes, 78, British non-fiction writer and businesswoman.
- Rick Mather, 75, American architect.
- Luis Molina, 74, American Olympic boxer (1956).
- Howard Phillips, 72, American politician, founder of the Constitution Party, dementia and Alzheimer's disease.
- Nosher Powell, 84, British actor, stuntman (Willow, First Knight) and boxer.
- Toby E. Rodes, 93, German businessman.
- Syed Zahiruddin, 95, Malaysian politician, Yang di-Pertua Negeri of Malacca (1975–1984), Ambassador to Ireland (1975) and the United Kingdom (1974), kidney failure.

=== 21 ===
- Gerard Amerongen, 98, Canadian politician and lawyer, Speaker of the Legislative Assembly of Alberta (1972–1986), MLA for Edmonton-Meadowlark (1971–1986).
- Chrissy Amphlett, 53, Australian singer (Divinyls), breast cancer and multiple sclerosis.
- Ludvig Johan Bakkevig, 91, Norwegian civil engineer and church leader.
- Barbara Barbaze, 90, Canadian baseball player (AAGPBL).
- Norman Borisoff, 94, American film producer and novelist.
- Ambati Brahmanaiah, 75, Indian politician, MP for Machilipatnam (1994–2004), MLA for Machilipatnam (1994–2004) and Avanigadda (since 2009), leader of the TDP.
- George Bunn, 87, American diplomat and jurist, led negotiation of the Treaty of Non-Proliferation of Nuclear Weapons.
- Morley Byron Bursey, 101, Canadian diplomat.
- Captain Steve, 16, American thoroughbred horse, winner of Dubai World Cup (2001), heart failure.
- Jean-Michel Damase, 85, French composer, pianist, and teacher.
- Shakuntala Devi, 83, Indian prodigy mental calculator, heart attack.
- Leopold Engleitner, 107, Austrian concentration camp survivor.
- James Fitzgerald, 67, English cricketer.
- Gordon D. Gayle, 95, American Marine Corps brigadier general and historian.
- Krishana Kumar Goyal, 80, Indian politician.
- Sigurd Helle, 92, Norwegian topographer.
- Richard Iton, 51, Canadian academic and writer, leukemia.
- Geraldo José, 77, Brazilian footballer.
- Layton Kor, 74, American climber, kidney failure and prostate cancer.
- Kriyananda, 86, American yogi and spiritual leader.
- Jimmy McGill, 87, Scottish footballer (Queen of the South), dementia.
- William Edward Murray, 93, Australian Roman Catholic prelate, Bishop of Wollongong (1975–1996).
- Toshio Narahashi, 86, Japanese pharmacologist.
- Bjarne Sandemose, 89, Norwegian inventor and film prop maker.

=== 22 ===
- Pedro Apellániz, 89, Spanish Olympic athlete.
- Struther Arnott, 78, Scottish biochemist and academic, Principal of St Andrews University (1986–1999).
- Vivi Bach, 73, Danish actress, heart failure.
- Doug Carlson, 73, American politician, member of the Minnesota House of Representatives (1971–1974, 1977–1990), natural causes.
- Dave Gold, 80, American retail businessman, founder of 99 Cents Only Stores, heart attack.
- George Stanley Gordon, 86, American advertising executive.
- Richie Havens, 72, American folk singer and guitarist, heart attack.
- Lalgudi Jayaraman, 82, Indian violinist, cardiac arrest.
- Carmel Kaine, 75, Australian violinist, co-founder/leader of Academy of St Martin in the Fields.
- Bob Leakey, 98, British caver.
- Clément Marchand, 100, Canadian poet and journalist.
- Benjamin Milstein, 94, British surgeon and academic.
- Lawrence Morley, 93, Canadian geophysicist.
- Mike Smith, 77, English footballer (Bradford City).
- Robert Suderburg, 77, American composer, conductor and pianist.
- J. S. Verma, 80, Indian judge, Supreme Court (since 1989), Chief Justice (1997–1998), multiple organ failure.

=== 23 ===
- Shirley Abbott, 88, American politician, US Ambassador to Lesotho (1983–1989), member of the Texas House of Representatives (1977–1979), cardiac complications.
- Shamshad Begum, 94, Indian singer.
- Norbert Blei, 77, American author and writer.
- Walter Boeykens, 75, Belgian clarinetist and conductor.
- Bob Brozman, 59, American guitarist and ethnomusicologist, suicide.
- José de Jesús Castillo Rentería, 85, Mexican Roman Catholic prelate, Bishop of Tuxtepec (1979–2005).
- Philip L. Clarke, 74, American voice actor (Transformers, Alvin and the Chipmunks, The Little Mermaid).
- Colonial Affair, 23, American thoroughbred, winner of Belmont Stakes (1993).
- Kathryn Wasserman Davis, 106, American philanthropist.
- Marv Diemer, 88, American politician, member of the Iowa House of Representatives (1978–1992).
- Robert W. Edgar, 69, American politician and executive (Common Cause), U.S. Representative from Pennsylvania (1975–1987), heart attack.
- Tony Grealish, 56, Irish footballer (Ireland, Brighton), cancer.
- Ralph Johnson, 91, English footballer (Norwich City).
- Norman Jones, 78, British television actor (Doctor Who, Crossroads).
- Antonio Maccanico, 88, Italian politician, Minister of Posts and Communications (1996–1998), Minister of Institutional Reform (2000–2001).
- Jim Mackonochie, 52, British Royal Navy officer and video game developer, liver cancer.
- Jim Mortimer, 91, British trade unionist, General Secretary of the Labour Party (1982–1985).
- Joseph R. Nolan, 87, American judge, member of the Massachusetts Supreme Judicial Court (1981–1995).
- Donald O'Brien, 87, French-Irish actor.
- Frank W. J. Olver, 88, British–born American mathematician.
- Mohammed Omar, c. 53, Afghan Taliban leader, tuberculosis.
- John Somers Payne, 87, Irish Olympic sailor (1956, 1960).
- Jose Solis, 73, Filipino politician, member of the House of Representatives for Sorsogon 2nd District (2001–2010).
- Arnold Wolf, 85, American businessman.

=== 24 ===
- Clara Berenbau, 32, Uruguayan actress and writer, cancer.
- Alfred Bieler, 90, Swiss Olympic ice hockey player (1948).
- Teodoro Buontempo, 67, Italian politician.
- Richard Everett Dorr, 69, American judge, US District Court for Western Missouri (since 2002), cancer.
- Larry Felser, 80, American sports journalist and columnist (Sporting News, The Buffalo News).
- Dave Kocourek, 75, American football player (San Diego Chargers, Oakland Raiders), dementia.
- Azuma Konno, 65, Japanese politician.
- Gary L. Lancaster, 63, American chief judge, member of US District Court for Western Pennsylvania (since 1993), natural causes.
- José Meneses, 89, Mexican Olympic basketball player.
- D. K. Adikesavulu Naidu, 72, Indian politician, MP for Chittoor (2004–2009), complications of cardiac surgery.
- Ni Zhifu, 79, Chinese inventor and politician.
- Zlatomir Obradov, 72, Croatian footballer.
- Saleem Pervez, 65, Pakistani cricketer, injuries sustained in traffic collision.
- Pedro Romualdo, 77, Filipino politician, member of House of Representatives for Camiguin (1987–1998, since 2007), Governor of Camiguin (1998–2007), pneumonia.
- Pierre Sadek, 75, Lebanese caricaturist.
- Frank Salvat, 78, British Olympic runner (1960).
- Murray Satterfield, 87, American college basketball coach (Boise State, College of Idaho).
- Storm Cat, 30, American thoroughbred stallion, euthanized due to cancer.

=== 25 ===
- Brian Adam, 64, Scottish politician, MSP for North East Scotland (1999–2003), Aberdeen North (2003–2011) and Aberdeen Donside (since 2011), cancer.
- Jacob Avshalomov, 94, Chinese-born American conductor and composer.
- Ambica Banerjee, 84, Indian politician, MP for Howrah (since 2006), West Bengal MLA for Howrah Central (1982–2005).
- György Berencsi, 72, Hungarian virologist.
- Sean Caffrey, 73, Irish actor (Doctor Who, Z-Cars, Coronation Street).
- Rick Camp, 59, American baseball player (Atlanta Braves), natural causes.
- Stanley Dashew, 96, American businessman.
- Virginia Gibson, 88, American actress (Seven Brides for Seven Brothers, Tea for Two).
- Moses Harrison, 81, American judge, member of the Supreme Court of Illinois (1992–2002), Chief Justice (2000–2002).
- Johnny Lockwood, 92, Australian actor (Number 96).
- Anna Proclemer, 89, Italian actress (A Matter of Time, Journey to Italy).
- Eion Scarrow, 81, New Zealand gardening television presenter and author.
- Calvin Sutker, 89, American politician, member of the Illinois House of Representatives (1985–1991).
- Yoshio Tabata, 94, Japanese ryūkōka and enka singer, songwriter and electric guitarist, pneumonia.
- Sam Williams, 82, American football player (Detroit Lions), heart failure.
- W. B. Young, 96, Scottish rugby union player.
- Kees Zijlstra, 82, Dutch politician.

=== 26 ===
- Ron Baggott, 96, Australian football player (Melbourne).
- Romualdas Ignas Bloškys, 77, Lithuanian politician.
- Jacqueline Brookes, 82, American actress (The Good Son, The Naked Gun 2½: The Smell of Fear) and acting teacher, lymphoma.
- Rüdiger Butte, 63, German politician, shot.
- Joseph Churchward, 80, Samoan–born New Zealand typeface designer, bowel cancer.
- Mireya Cueto, 91, Mexican puppeteer.
- Isaiah Dixon, 90, American politician, member of the Maryland House of Delegates (1966–1982), heart failure.
- William L. Guy, 93, American politician, Governor of North Dakota (1961–1973), Alzheimer's disease.
- Kenneth Hunter, 73, Scottish consultant physician.
- George Jones, 81, American country music singer ("He Stopped Loving Her Today", "The Race Is On"), hypoxic respiratory failure.
- Dave Kleiman, 46, American computer security detective.
- Tom Knapp, 62, American sharpshooter, pulmonary fibrosis.
- Lillian Leach, 76, American singer, lung cancer.
- Al Loehr, 85, American Democratic politician.
- Owen Lynch, 82, American anthropologist.
- Sir Guy Millard, 96, British diplomat.
- Len Rempt-Halmmans de Jongh, 85, Dutch politician.
- Marion Rushing, 76, American football player (St. Louis Cardinals, Atlanta Falcons, Houston Oilers), Parkinson's disease.
- Earl Silverman, 64, Canadian domestic abuse survivor and Men's rights advocate.
- Edward Szklarczyk, 71, Polish Olympic athlete.
- Farrell Temata, 68, New Zealand rugby union player (Waikato) and coach, heart attack.
- Mary Thom, 68, American magazine executive editor (Ms.), traffic collision.
- Jim Tucker, 78, American investigative journalist, complications from fall.
- Tui Uru, 87, New Zealand opera singer and broadcaster.

=== 27 ===
- Aída Bortnik, 75, Argentine screenwriter (The Official Story).
- Tony Byrne, 82, Irish Olympic medalist boxer (1956).
- Lorraine Copeland, 92, British archaeologist and Special Operations Executive agent.
- Dhoodaan, 72, Ethiopian Somali language writer. (death announced on this date)
- Antonio Díaz, 43, Spanish footballer (Villarreal, Salamanca, Getafe).
- Paulino Ferrer, 86, Venezuelan Olympic hurdler.
- Albert Feuerwerker, 86, American historian.
- Trudi Gerster, 93, Swiss actress and politician.
- Maurice Gransart, 82, French footballer (Olympique de Marseille).
- Jack Harker, 86, American computer scientist and businessman.
- Sean Hartter, 39, American illustrator, writer and musician, asthma attack.
- Jérôme Louis Heldring, 95, Dutch journalist and columnist.
- Aloysius Jin Luxian, 96, Chinese Roman Catholic prelate, Bishop of Shanghai (since 1988).
- Mutula Kilonzo, 65, Kenyan politician, Senator (since 2010), MP for Mbooni (2008–2010) and senior counsel.
- Jean Lessard, 80, Canadian alpine skier.
- Joseph Mwanyungwa, 46, Malawian judge, pneumonia.
- Walter Nalangu, Solomon Islands news presenter and journalist, asthma attack.
- Joseph O'Connell, 81, Australian Roman Catholic prelate, Auxiliary Bishop of Melbourne (1976–2006).
- Arthur Joseph O'Neill, 95, American Roman Catholic prelate, Bishop of Rockford (1968–1994).
- Norman Routledge, 85, British mathematician and schoolteacher.
- Eeva Ruoppa, 80, Finnish Olympic bronze medallist cross-country skier (1960).
- Jürgen Warnke, 81, German politician.
- Theodore J. Williams, 89, American computer scientist.

=== 28 ===
- Richard Barry, 93, Irish politician, TD for Cork East (1953–1981).
- Alf Bellis, 92, English footballer.
- Barry Fey, 75, American concert promoter (Red Rocks Amphitheatre, Colorado Symphony Orchestra).
- Norris Hundley, 77, American academic, historian, and writer.
- Jalsan, 66, Chinese politician and Buddhist leader.
- Brad Lesley, 54, American baseball player and actor (Little Big League), heart attack.
- Fredrick McKissack, 73, American children's book writer.
- Julio Ojeda Pascual, 81, Spanish-born Peruvian Roman Catholic prelate, Vicar Apostolic of San Ramón (1987–2003).
- Araber Rahaman, 82, Indian politician, Tripura MLA for Boxanagar (1978–1988).
- Sripathi Rajeshwar Rao, 73, Indian politician, Andhra Pradesh MLA for Sanathnagar (1985–1989, 1999–2003), kidney failure.
- John C. Reynolds, 77, American computer scientist, heart attack.
- Sailendra Nath Roy, 48, Indian stuntman, heart attack.
- Carl M. Rynning-Tønnesen, 88, Norwegian police chief.
- Viola B. Sanders, 92, American naval officer.
- Jack Shea, 84, American director (The Jeffersons, Silver Spoons), President of the DGA (1997–2002), Alzheimer's disease.
- János Starker, 88, Hungarian-born American cellist.
- Paulo Vanzolini, 89, Brazilian zoologist, poet and samba composer (Onze sambas e uma capoeira), complications of pneumonia.
- Bernie Wood, 70, New Zealand sport author and journalist, cancer.

=== 29 ===
- Harry Blaney, 85, Irish politician, TD for Donegal North-East (1997–2002).
- Pierre Chassang, 95, French aikidoka.
- Alex Elisala, 20, New Zealand rugby league player (North Queensland Cowboys), suicide by jumping.
- Pablo Etchegoin, 48, Argentine-New Zealand physicist, pancreatic cancer.
- Denton Fox, 65, American football player, stroke.
- Pietro Garlato, 85, Italian Roman Catholic prelate, Bishop of Palestrina (1986–1991) and Tivoli (1991–2003).
- Pesah Grupper, 88, Israeli politician, Minister of Agriculture (1983–1984).
- Suhaimi Hassan, 59, Malaysian politician, heart attack.
- Parekura Horomia, 62, New Zealand politician, MP for Ikaroa-Rāwhiti (since 1999), Minister of Māori Affairs (2000–2008).
- Channa Horwitz, 80, American geometric artist, complications of Crohn's disease.
- Shahid Israr, 63, Pakistani cricketer (Karachi, Sindh, national team).
- Mike McMahon Jr., 71, Canadian ice hockey player (New York Rangers).
- John La Montaine, 93, American composer, Pulitzer Prize (1959).
- Erling Løseth, 85, Norwegian politician.
- Shinji Maki, 78, Japanese comedian, suspected suicide by jumping.
- Ernest Michael, 87, American mathematician.
- Kevin Moore, 55, English footballer (Grimsby Town, Southampton), Pick's disease.
- Ole K. Sara, 76, Norwegian politician.
- Basudeo Singh, 80, Indian politician, Bihar MLA for Begusarai (1990–1995).
- Patrick Taval, 56, Papua New Guinean Roman Catholic prelate, Bishop of Kerema (since 2010).
- Marianna Zachariadi, 23, Greek-born Cypriot pole vaulter, Commonwealth Games silver medalist (2010), Hodgkin's lymphoma.

=== 30 ===
- Don Bowman, 76, Australian politician, member of the New South Wales Legislative Assembly for Swansea (1981–1988, 1991–1995).
- Tito Buss, 87, Brazilian Roman Catholic prelate, Bishop of Rio do Sul (1969–2000).
- Roberto Chabet, 76, Filipino artist, heart attack.
- Jolico Cuadra, 73, Filipino poet and artist.
- Shirley Firth, 59, Canadian Gwich'in Olympic skier (1972, 1976, 1980, 1984).
- Viviane Forrester, 87, French writer, essayist, novelist and literary critic.
- Emil Frei, 89, American cancer researcher.
- Irineos Galanakis, 101, Greek Orthodox prelate, Bishop of Kissamos (1957–1971), Metropolitan of Germany (1971–1980), Metropolitan of Kissamos (1982–2005).
- Mike Gray, 77, American screenwriter (The China Syndrome, Star Trek: The Next Generation) and author, heart failure.
- Lois Jotter, 99, American botanist.
- Andrew J. Offutt, 78, American science fiction author, cirrhosis.
- Sándor Rácz, 80, Hungarian politician, veteran of the Hungarian Revolution of 1956.
- Fakir Vaghela, 60, Indian politician.
