= 2013 in radio =

The following is a list of events affecting radio broadcasting in 2013. Events listed include radio program debuts, finales, cancellations, and station launches, closures and format changes, as well as information about controversies.

== Notable events ==
=== January ===
Date	Event
25	Swiss radio presenter DJ Antoine releases another hit album with Sky Is the Limit, a local #1 and #6 in Germany.

=== February ===
Date	Event
23	Saint FM Community Radio is launched to serve the South Atlantic island of Saint Helena, following the closure of Saint FM in the previous year.

=== March ===
Date	Event
24	Tag 91.1 is launched in Dubai, United Arab Emirates, catering specifically for the local Filipino population.

=== May ===
Date	Event
15	Virgin Radio Lebanon is launched on 89.5 FM.

=== June ===
Date	Event
17	Swedish DJ Avicii releases "Wake Me Up!", with vocals from Aloe Blacc, which tops the charts in more than 10 countries.

=== July ===
Date	Event
1	Giyani Community Radio is launched in Giyani, South Africa.
14	Latvijas Radio 5 is launched, with a programme of exclusive live recordings from the Positivus Festival in Salacgrīva.

=== September ===
Date	Event
10	Russian-German radio DJ Zedd releases "Stay the night" featuring Hayley Williams, which becomes a global hit.
23	Radio Ritam is launched from Sarajevo, joining the newly formed "Soundset" national radio group in Bosnia and Herzegovina.

=== October ===
Date	Event
2	NRK P1+ is launched by the Norwegian Broadcasting Corporation on DAB and online.

=== December ===
Date	Event
28	The 4th Pakistan Media Awards, due to be held on this day, were postponed to January 2014, "due to an overwhelming response from the public to online voting in the public poll and high demand from the public to extend the nomination period".

== Debuts ==
Date	Event
5 July	Asia Pop 40, the first regional weekly chart countdown radio show produced in Asia specifically for Asian radio, hosted by Dom Lau.
26 August	Les pieds dans le plat, a French weekday radio show consisting of news and media reporting, is launched on Europe 1, with Cyril Hanouna as host (ended in 2016).
date unknown	Remember When, a Sunday afternoon programme of music hosted by Norma Marco, is launched on DZMM with simulcast on The Filipino Channel worldwide.

== Endings ==
Date	Event
13 December	The Dutch Friday evening show Ekstra Weekend comes to an end after seven years.
20 December	Breakfast with Hector ends its three-year run on RTÉ 2fm after host Hector Ó hEochagáin announces he is returning to television.

== Deaths ==
Date	Name	Age	Notability	Source
1 January	Christopher Martin-Jenkins	67	Cricket journalist and radio commentator	
18 February	Kevin Black	69	New Zealand radio broadcaster	
21 March	Jean-Michel Damase	85	French composer, pianist, and teacher	
27 April	Walter Nalangu	age unknown	Solomon Islands news presenter and journalist	
12 May	Constantino Romero	65	Spanish voice actor, television and radio host	
13 May	Jill Kitson	74	Australian radio broadcaster and literary journalist	
4 June	Hermann Gunnarsson	66	Icelandic sportsman, television and radio personality	
7 July	Tom Christian	77	Pitcairn Island radio operator	
10 July	Concha García Campoy	54	Spanish radio and television journalist and personality	
29 July	Munir Hussain	83	Pakistani cricket commentator, administrator, and journalist	
30 July	Belal Muhammad	77	Bangladeshi radio broadcaster and independence activist	
30 July	Colm Murray	61	Irish sports journalist and broadcaster	
