= Ben B. Rubinowitz =

- Education: Boston University (BA); Hofstra University School of Law (JD)
- Occupation: Lawyer
- Organizations: The Inner Circle of Advocates

Ben B. Rubinowitz is an American trial lawyer and managing partner of the New York law firm Gair, Gair, Conason, Rubinowitz, Bloom, Hershenhorn, Steigman & Mackauf. He is known for his work in personal injury, medical malpractice, and catastrophic injury litigation. He is a member of The Inner Circle of Advocates, an invitation-only organization limited to 100 of the top plaintiff trial lawyers in the United States.

== Early life and education ==
Rubinowitz was raised in New York. He attended Boston University, graduating magna cum laude and Phi Beta Kappa in 1978 with a Bachelor of Arts. He earned a Juris Doctor from Hofstra University School of Law in 1981. During law school, he was mentored by prosecutor Patrick McCloskey, who influenced his approach to trial preparation and courtroom advocacy.

== Legal career ==
After graduating from law school, Rubinowitz served as an assistant District Attorney in Nassau County, New York, where he prosecuted approximately 50 jury trials.

In 1984, he entered private practice, focusing on plaintiff-side civil litigation, particularly medical malpractice and catastrophic injury cases.

In 1989, Rubinowitz joined a Manhattan-based personal injury firm that is now known as Gair, Gair, Conason, Rubinowitz, Bloom, Hershenhorn, Steigman & Mackauf, where he later became managing partner. Over the course of his career, Rubinowitz has obtained at least 32 jury verdicts and more than 200 settlements exceeding $1 million. His work has involved motor vehicle accidents, construction injuries, medical negligence, civil rights violations, and other catastrophic injury claims.

== Teaching and writing ==
Rubinowitz has served as an adjunct professor of trial advocacy at the Benjamin N. Cardozo School of Law and Hofstra University School of Law. He co-authors a "Trial Advocacy" column in the New York Law Journal and lectures at continuing legal education programs and law schools including Harvard, Yale, Emory, Fordham, St. John's, Hofstra, and Cardozo. He has served as president of the New York City chapter of the American Board of Trial Advocates and on the board of directors of the New York State Trial Lawyers Association.

In 2014, the National Institute for Trial Advocacy awarded him the Robert E. Keeton Award. He has served for more than 25 years as a Program Director and Team Leader at the National Institute for Trial Advocacy. Rubinowitz has lectured in more than 1,000 legal and medical education programs and has been a featured speaker at institutions including New York University, Mount Sinai Hospital, Columbia Presbyterian Hospital, and Vanderbilt University.

== Notable cases ==
=== Metro-North Valhalla train collision ===
Rubinowitz served as lead trial counsel for claimants injured in the Metro-North Valhalla train collision. A jury apportioned 71% liability against the railroad, and the case resulted in a post-verdict resolution exceeding $180 million.

=== William Lee v. Westchester Medical Center ===
In 2024, Rubinowitz obtained a $120 million jury verdict in a medical malpractice case involving failure to diagnose and treat a stroke, resulting in permanent brain damage. The verdict has been reported as the largest in Westchester County.

=== Morgan Wang v. Sexton ===
Rubinowitz obtained a $71 million verdict for a plaintiff who sustained spinal injuries in an automobile accident.

=== Gloria Aguilar v. New York City Transit Authority (2009) ===
In 2009, Rubinowitz obtained a $27.5 million jury verdict for a woman who lost her leg after being struck by a bus operated by the New York City Transit Authority. The award was among the largest of its kind in New York and was upheld on appeal.

=== Joan Rivers medical malpractice case (2014–2016) ===
Rubinowitz, together with Jeffrey Bloom, represented the estate of comedian Joan Rivers in a medical malpractice lawsuit brought by her daughter, Melissa Rivers, following Rivers’ death in 2014. The case was resolved through a confidential settlement in 2016.

=== Diocese of Brooklyn sexual abuse settlement (2018) ===
In 2018, Rubinowitz was part of the legal team that obtained a $27.5 million settlement from the Roman Catholic Diocese of Brooklyn on behalf of four men alleging childhood sexual abuse.

=== Yanes v. City of New York (2019) ===
In 2019, Rubinowitz represented a student severely burned during a classroom chemistry demonstration. A jury awarded approximately $59 million in damages, including substantial compensation for pain and suffering and appellate decisions regarding Yanes v. City of New York.

=== Westchester Medical Center stroke verdict (2023) ===
In November 2023, Rubinowitz served as lead trial counsel in a medical malpractice case against Westchester Medical Center, obtaining a $120 million jury verdict for a 41-year-old stroke victim who suffered severe brain damage. It was reported as the largest medical malpractice verdict recorded in Westchester County.
