= Morris B. Chapman =

American lawyer

Morris B. Chapman (1919–February 18, 2007) was an American lawyer from Madison County, Illinois and a prominent plaintiffs' trial lawyer.

== Biography ==
Chapman graduated from Saint Louis University School of Law in 1942. Chapman "was instrumental in developing trial rules that require parties to disclose their evidence to each other" before trial and "served as a mentor to many ... prominent lawyers and judges" in the Metro East region of Illinois. He served as a president of the Madison County Bar Association and the Illinois Trial Lawyers Association, was an Illinois state committeeman for the Association of Trial Lawyers of America (ATLA), and was a member of the Inner Circle of Advocates.

Chapman argued before the U.S. Supreme Court in 1954, and was at the time the youngest attorney ever to do so. Chapman participated in the civil rights movement in the 1960s and 1970s; he did volunteer work with the American Civil Liberties Union in Mississippi, marched with Martin Luther King Jr. in Chicago in 1966, and was a lifetime member of the NAACP. Chapman practiced law for over 63 years, and tried his last case, a medical malpractice matter, just months before he died.

During his life, Chapman did volunteer work for the poor and was an amateur pilot. He also enjoyed collecting watches, flying airplanes, and raising horses.

Chapman died at his home at age 87 on February 18, 2007, of prostate cancer. He lived in Granite City, Illinois. Chapman was the father of Justice Melissa Chapman of the Illinois 5th District Appellate Court.
