= Cory Richards =

Cory Richards may refer to:

- Cory Richards (climber) (born 1981), American climber, mountaineer, and photographer
- Cory L. Richards (1948–2013), American activist for birth control and abortion rights
- Corey Richards (born 1975), Australian cricketer
