= Makame =

Makame is a Tanzanian given name. Notable people with the name include:

- Makame Mbarawa (born 1961), Tanzanian politician
- Makame Rashidi (died 2013), Tanzanian diplomat
