= Gloria de Souza =

Indian social entrepreneur

- Born: 5 April 1937
- Died: 3 April 2013 (aged 75)
- Occupation(s): Educator, Social Entrepreneur, Reformer, Founder
- Organization: Parisar Asha
- Website: parisarasha.com

Gloria de Souza (5 April 1937 – 3 April 2013) was a social entrepreneur and the first fellow of the international non-profit organization Ashoka. She was known for her work in educational reform and modern social entrepreneurship. She began working in Mumbai, India as a primary school teacher and in 1971, while she was teaching at a private Jesuit school, de Souza was prompted to make changes by adopting experiential and environmental methods in her curriculum. She noted that India's rate of brain drain was high at the time and wanted to change the educational system as a whole.

== Social Entrepreneurship ==
=== Ashoka and Parisar Asha ===
De Souza became a fellow of Ashoka: Innovators for the Public in 1982 by Bill Drayton and his colleagues. They elected de Souza for her talent and commitment to the cause, as well as business acumen. With support from Ashoka, she quit her teaching job and proceeded to build her own local NGO that same year, Parisar Asha.

Through Parisar Asha, de Souza developed the Environmental Studies program. She successfully persuaded the Mumbai municipal school board into allowing 1,700 public schools to conduct a test pilot for environmental studies. In the late 1980s, the Indian government adopted it into its public education system, making it a curriculum requirement for students in grade 1–3. Entitled Environmental Studies Approach and Learning (ESAL), the program is now the core principle in Parisar Asha.

=== Other institutions ===
De Souza collaborated with many other NGOs, government agencies and corporations on educational reform. Her 1988 collaboration with Defence for Children International evaluated street children and public institutions. They identified possible institutions for 'reception,' 'observation,' and 'rehabilitation,' and found on-the-ground that bureaucratic incompetencies hindered the education and protection of these children worldwide.

In 2001, educational centers in Indian mega-cities received a commission from the United Nations Educational, Scientific And Cultural Organization in New Delhi to conduct a study on street and working children in India. In the published report, she reported results on rehabilitation of working children.

== Personal life and philosophy ==
De Souza was born on 5 April 1937. She has stated that her goal was never success, but rather, fruitfulness. She attributed her vision, tenacity, and openminded-ness towards introducing tenets of modern, Western education to developing countries.

She died on 3 April 2013.
