= Vernal Charles =

South African cricketer (1985–2013)

Personal information
- Born: 20 July 1985; Port Elizabeth, South Africa
- Died: 7 April 2013 (aged 27); Port Elizabeth, South Africa
- Source: ESPNcricinfo, 8 June 2016

Vernal Charles (20 July 1985 – 7 April 2013) was a South African cricketer. He played four first-class matches for Eastern Province between 2011 and 2012. He was killed in a road accident in Port Elizabeth.
