= Kenneth Hunter (physician) =

Scottish consultant physician (1939–2013)

Kenneth Ross Hunter FRCP (31 May 1939 – 26 April 2013) was a Scottish consultant physician who specialised in diabetes.

== Education ==
Hunter was born in Glasgow and educated at Strathallan School near Perth, Scotland, and St John's College, Cambridge. He proceeded to University College Hospital, London, for his clinical training and was awarded the Fellowes gold medal. Following the conclusion of his house appointments, which included working for Max Rosenheim, he was appointed to a general medical rotation post between the University College Hospital and the Whittington Hospital. In 1967, he gained Membership of the Royal College of Physicians (MRCP).

== Physician ==
Hunter completed his MD and was appointed to a general medical rotating post in Bristol, though he started in Plymouth, and this is where he began working with diabetes. After four years in Bristol he was seconded to Hammersmith Hospital in London, to receive specialist training in clinical pharmacology and therapeutics. He was the first person to qualify in this new discipline in the United Kingdom. Unfortunately, the post that was created for him had to be cancelled because of a financial crisis and cutbacks.

In March 1977, Hunter was appointed as a general physician with a special interest in diabetes to the Plymouth Health District. He began his consultant career at Devonport Hospital, before moving to Freedom Fields Hospital and then to Derriford Hospital. Initially, the diabetic clinic was based at Freedom Fields and consisted of Hunter and one clinical assistant. By 1999, there was a diabetes centre, with five specialist nurses, full-time dietetic and chiropody support, and a team of research nurses. This multidisciplinary approach enabled the Plymouth centre to become the first in the United Kingdom to move all its patients on to a new form and strength of insulin.

Hunter was a member of the British Medical Association national committee, the regional manpower committee, and sat on numerous committees at hospital, district and regional levels. In 1983, he was elected a Fellow of the Royal College of Physicians (FRCP) for whom he was a regional adviser and examiner. Hunter was also awarded an honorary fellowship by the College of Occupational Therapists in 1992. He published numerous research papers during his career.

In 2001, Hunter gave the FitzPatrick lecture at the Royal College of Physicians. He spoke about the career of John Clarke, whose 1781 notes from John Hunter's lectures on surgery had been found in Plymouth. Hunter also served as both secretary and treasurer of the Plymouth Medical Society.
