= Sándor Rácz =

Hungarian politician

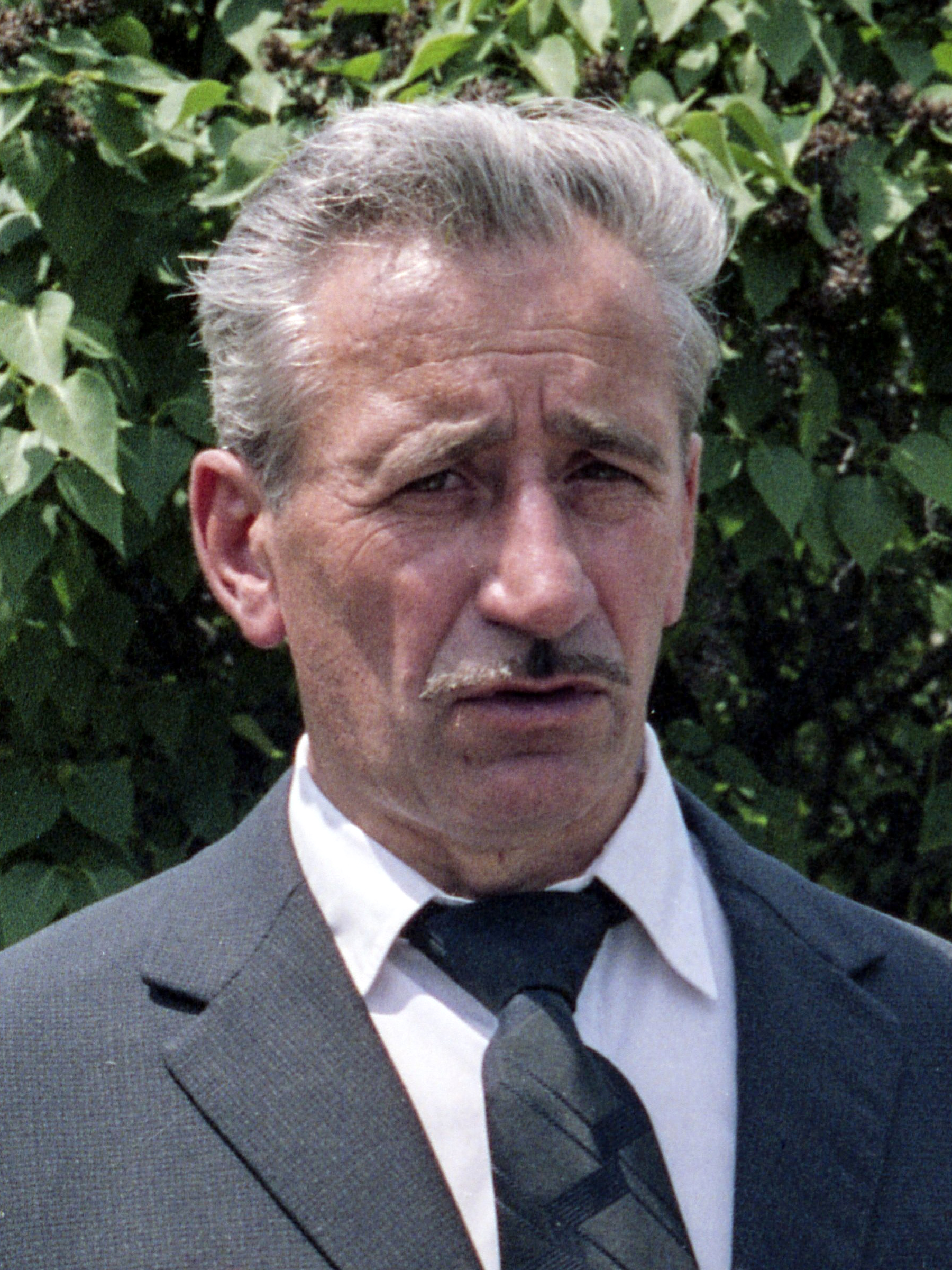
Sándor Rácz

Sándor Rácz (17 March 1933 – 30 April 2013) was a Hungarian politician.

Rácz was born in Hódmezővásárhely, and represented the FKGP. He was a famous veteran of the Hungarian Revolution of 1956. He died, aged 80, in Budapest.
