= Zastrow Simms =

Joseph L. "Zastrow" Simms (May 1940 – April 2013) was an American civil rights activist in Annapolis, Maryland. His life was the subject of a 2006 documentary entitled "Pip & Zastrow."

== Awards ==
In January 1997, Simms received the Dr. Martin Luther King Jr. Peacemaker Award.
