= Sailendra Nath Roy =

Stunt performer and Guinnes World Record holder (1964–2013)

- Born: 1964; India
- Died: 28 April 2013 (aged 48–49); Teesta River

Sailendra Nath Roy (1964–2013) was an Indian man who registered his name in the Guinness Book of World Records for the furthest distance travelled on a zip wire using hair. He achieved the record at Neemrana Fort Palace, Neemrana, Rajasthan, India, on 1 March 2011. Sailendra zip lined the entire 82.5 metres attached to the zip wire only by his hair, which he tied in a looped ponytail. Again in September 2012, he pulled a Darjeeling Himalayan Railway locomotive with his ponytail in north Bengal for 2.5 metres (8.2 feet) in the city of Siliguri, West Bengal.

== Death ==
Roy died on 28 April 2013, while trying to beat his own record of furthest distance travelled on a zip wire using hair. Roy died due to a heart attack during his record attempt at Teesta River. His ponytail became stuck in the wheeler of the rope halfway through the stunt and he was left hanging in midair for about 25 minutes. He was 49 years old.
