= Sean Hartter =

American illustrator, writer and musician

Akira kurosawa

Sean Hartter (November 6, 1973 – April 27, 2013) was an American illustrator, writer and musician. He is best known for his book and poster art and music projects.

== Career ==
=== Artwork ===
In 2004, Hartter worked for the Taunton Gazette for which he was a movie reviewer and cartoonist. He also undertook freelance work for numerous other magazines including The South Coast Insider, where he was a staff writer. The same year, his work appeared in Star Wars Insider magazine.

In 2007, he wrote and drew a story entitled Dios Del Tiburon y Los Fantasmas Mecanicos in the Mexican comic book El Comiquero Volume Two from 656 Comics. He also became very well known on the website DeviantArt through his character "Nobody the Idiot".

In 2008, CatsCurious Press published the children's book Three Things About Animals... and Only One of Them's True written by Jason Shannon with artwork by Hartter. Hartter also produced the artwork for the follow-up book, "Three Things About Bugs... and Only One of Them's True" which was cancelled soon after.

In 2009, he had artwork in numerous issues of the UK's Cereal:Geek Magazine as well as pin-ups for multiple comic books. He worked with the syndicated television show Saturday Fright Special which showcases classic and obscure horror films. He also designed posters for the show's "Spooktacular" events held at the Colonial Theater in Keene, New Hampshire and provided posters for the Vermont Samurai Kaiju Festival event held in Brattleboro.

In 2012, Hartter's work was prominently featured in issue 15 of Black Clock, a literary journal published by CalArts. He was subsequently contacted by entertainment writer Geoff Boucher during his last year working at the LA Times, and provided posters for the LA Times Hero Complex Film Festival in 2012.

Hartter appeared in the film "Murder University" with his son Griffin. They are credited as "Burly Frat Guy" and "Well Endowed Frat Boy" respectively.

In 2013, Hartter was again commissioned by Boucher, who had moved to Entertainment Weekly, to produce the artwork for the publication's website as well as posters for the 2013 Hero Complex Film Festival. However, Hartter died two days before his scheduled departure.

=== Music ===
Hartter was a part of the musical project Brothermaniac. Hartter appeared on the releases under the name "Mockdog".

=== Film ===
He had composed music for director Dante Tomaselli. His music was featured in the horror film Torture Chamber, for which he also created all of the promotional poster art.

He also did a select few pieces of music for "Murder University" as well as posters and promotional material for other films from Scorpio Film Releasings.

Hartter contributed art and music to the documentary film, “My Name is Jonah”. He also contributed artwork to promotional items made for the film. “My Name is Jonah” was released one year after his death. The movie was dedicated to his memory.

== Personal life ==
Hartter married Allison Ruth Clark, his high-school partner, in 1994. The couple had two sons: Griffin Michael Hartter, born on July 11, 1994, and Gabriel Isaiah Hartter, born on July 3, 1997. According to family accounts, he introduced his children to franchises such as Transformers and the films of Akira Kurosawa, while also sharing his interests in art, music, film, and literature. He remained married to Clark throughout his life.

Hartter died in Brockton, Massachusetts, on the morning of April 27, 2013, due to complications following an asthma attack.

He was cremated with a service held a week after his death.

== Works ==
=== Discography ===
- HARTTER presents "MUSIC FOR THE POOR DEVILS" (2013)
- HARTTansformers (film series)ER presents "VELVET MONSTER PAINTINGS" (2013)
- HARTTER presents "THE BIG KISSOFF" (TBA, Posthumous Release)

=== Bibliography ===
- Mars Hall (Novel)
- Knuckle Job (Unpublished Novel, Currently Lost)
- The Trainwreck Method (Poetry)
- Mutt: The Strange Life of A Nobody (Unpublished Memoirs)
- Weird But Real Creatures! (Coloring Book)
- Three Things About Animals...And Only One Of Them's True! (Illustrations)

=== Comics ===
- Nobody the Idiot
- Crowhead: Bastard Son of the Mountain
- Bleeding Worlds
- Babyskull
- Mega Beast Brawl
- My Name is Jonah: FCBD
