= Joseph Mwanyungwa =

Malawian high court judge

Joseph Mwanyungwa (1967 – 27 April 2013) was a judge on the High Court of Malawi. In 2000, he held the position of assistant chief state advocate. On 7 August 2007, Mwanyungwa's home in Blantyre was raided after he ruled against the government, in what the acting director of the anti-corruption bureau called a "normal routine operation." The event took place after he refused to vacate an injunction sought by opposition MPs Gerald Mponda and Leonard Mangulama to indefinitely adjourn parliament. The vacating had been sought by the attorney general. This followed weeks of conflict between President Bingu wa Mutharika and opposition parties over a previous court ruling allowing the speaker of the parliament to sack the 41 MPs who crossed over to Mutharika's party after being elected under the banner of other parties. The sacking of these MPs would cause the collapse of the president's minority administration and trigger large numbers of by-elections. In response, opposition parties refused to discuss the budget. In a press conference of the Democratic Progressive Party held on the seventh, Mwanyungwa and lawyer Ralph Kasambara were heavily criticized; Deputy Secretary General Francis Mphepo stated, "What Justice Manyungwa and Kasambara have done is practically the same as a coup d'état. The act of meeting at night to conspire only borders on witchcraft. These two will be held accountable for anything that might happen to this country."
