= Lafe Ward =

American lawyer and politician

Member of the West Virginia Senate
- In office 1971–1983

Personal details
- Born: August 23, 1925 Williamson, West Virginia, U.S.
- Died: April 10, 2013 (aged 87) Atlanta, Georgia, U.S.
- Education: University of North Carolina at Chapel Hill (BA); West Virginia University (JD)

Military service
- Branch/service: United States Navy
- Battles/wars: World War II

Lafe Preston Ward (August 23, 1925 – April 10, 2013) was an American politician and lawyer.

== Early life and education ==
Born in Williamson, West Virginia, Ward graduated from University of North Carolina at Chapel Hill and received his Juris Doctor degree from West Virginia University College of Law.

== Career ==
Ward served in the United States Navy during World War II. He was city attorney of Williamson, West Virginia, and served as prosecuting attorney and on the board of education for Mingo County, West Virginia. A Democrat, Ward served in the West Virginia Senate from 1971 to 1983.

== Personal life ==
Ward died in Atlanta, Georgia.
