= Richard Grand =

American lawyer

Richard Grand (1930 – 2013) was an American lawyer based in Tucson, Arizona.

Grand was born in Gdańsk, Poland, in 1930, and nine years later emigrated to America with his family. Originally based in New York, he graduated from New York University and later gained his degree in Law from the University of Arizona in 1958.

In 1972 he won a $3.5m personal injury claim, which was the largest such award in American legal history (at that time). Subsequently, he founded the Inner Circle of Advocates, an exclusive legal society with membership restricted to, then, 50 lawyers who had won more than $1 million in damages. He was also the President of the Richard Grand Society in Britain, a similar organisation. The Richard Grand Society was arguably still more exclusive, as membership was limited to only 25 lawyers.

Grand never retired from the legal profession, and was still practicing when he died in San Francisco in April 2013.
