= Maysara Abu Hamdiya =

Palestinian fighter (1948–2013)

Maysara Ahmed Mohammed Abu Hamdia

Palestinian Liberation Organization Fighter
- In office 1970–2013

Personal details
- Born: 1948 Hebron, Palestine
- Died: 2 April 2013 (aged 65) Soroka jail, Beersheba, Israel
- Party: Fatah
- Occupation: Fighter, Colonel

Maysara Ahmed Mohammed Abu Hamdia (1948 - April 2, ميسرة أبو حمدية) (2013) was a fighter in the Palestine Liberation Organization.

== Militancy ==
He joined the Palestinian Student Union (PSU). He was sentenced to 10 months in jail in 1969 for affiliation with the PSU since all Palestinian unions were banned under Israeli Law. In 1970, he became a fighter for the Palestinian National Liberation Movement (Fatah). He was with PLO forces in South Lebanon fighting against Israeli forces that invaded Lebanon.

He mobilized attacks against the Israeli presence in the West Bank. He was arrested at the end of 1975 and deported to Jordan in 1978. In Jordan, he was the assistant for Khalil al-Wazir (Abu Jihad) and was responsible for Intifada Logistics. He returned to the West Bank at the end of 1998 and joined the Preventive Security Apparatus of the Palestinian Authority as a Colonel. After the beginning of the Second Intifada in September 2000, he was arrested for attempted murder. He was given a life sentence (99 years according to Israeli Military Law).

In August 2012, Abu Hamdia complained of general weakness, sore throat and pain in his joints. After examination by a doctor, according to his family, he received some injections. Abu Hamdia asked again for proper examination to diagnose his illness. After four additional months, prison staff transported him to a hospital in Tel-Aviv. According to Abu Hamdia's wife, he said, "They transferred me to the hospital in the prisoners bus. The steel bus seats were uncomfortable. I fell many times during the 6 hour trip. I will not go again unless they bring an ambulance." When he went to the hospital, the doctors took samples from his throat for tissue diagnosis, but test results were never shared with him. He remained in jail with other Palestinian prisoners. After a while, his health deteriorated, and he was not offered any medications besides painkillers. His voice disappeared, his lymph nodes swelled up, and he became very weak. He could not change his clothes nor could he go to the toilet. Despite this, the Israeli Prison Authority (IPS) left him in the cell.

The prisoners officially demanded the IPS to transfer Abu Hamdia to a hospital, but the IPS said it was too late, and Abu Hamdia had only days to live. A week prior to his death, the authorities transferred him to Soroka Hospital in Be'er Sheva. They did another biopsy and declared for the first time that he had throat cancer. He received only two chemotherapy sessions and died on Tuesday, April 2 at 6 am. An autopsy was performed on his body, and the Israeli government declared that cancer had spread throughout his body. They refused to release his medical records and the results of the medical tests.

== Legacy ==
Abu Hamdia's importance to Palestinian liberation was reflected in the clashes that spread inside the prisons and the Israeli use of force to subdue Palestinian prisoners after his death. He was promoted to General and soon after to Major General by Palestinian President Mahmoud Abbas in 2007. A formal military funeral was held after his death.

Upon his death, Palestinians became aggravated as they were following his case through the Palestinian Prisoners Club and the Palestinian Ministry of Prisoners. Their expectation was for him to be released or receive appropriate medical treatment. Clashes erupted all over the West Bank resulting in the deaths of two Palestinian teenagers, cousins Amer Nassar and Naji Balbisy, in Tulkarm, north of the West Bank. The Israeli government continued to hold his records. They claimed that Abu Hamdia received proper treatment, in contrast to a Palestinian autopsy that disputes this claim.
