= K.P. Bhaskar =

Indian classical dance instructor and maestro

K.P. Bhaskar (1925 – 17 April 2013) was an Indian classical dance instructor and maestro. He was born in Kerala, India in 1925 and died at age 88 on 17 April 2013 following a heart illness.
