= Suhaimi Hassan =

Malaysian politician

Suhaimi Hassan (died April 29, 2013) was a Malaysian politician of the Parti Keadilan Rakyat.

== Death ==
On April 29, 2013, he died of a heart attack while driving his car.
