= Parisar Asha =

Not-for-profit NGO

- Founded: 1982
- Founder: Gloria De Souza
- Type: Community Service
- Purpose: Children's Learning
- Location: Mumbai, India
- Key people: Ms. Aarati Savur
- Website: http://www.parisarasha.com/

Parisar Asha is a not-for-profit NGO, registered as public trust based out of Mumbai. It was incepted in 1982 by the Late Gloria De Souza, who died in 2013. The trust aims to serve children through a unique learning approach ‘ESAL’ - The Environmental Studies Approach towards Learning. At present, the CEO of the trust is Ms. Aarati Savur.

== Areas of work ==
Parisar Asha has worked for more than 800 private and government schools in India. The NGO aims at helping the schools to upgrade their teaching-learning system at par with international standards through its unique model ESAL aligning with the state board curriculum framework.

== Activism ==
- September 2015 – The NGO launched ‘Positive Parenting Helpline’.
- April 2015 – The NGO conducted free film-making workshop for 10 days for the less privileged children at Nityanand Marg Mumbai Public School in Andheri East. 30 students were chosen for the workshop. They underwent practical sessions taken by Rohit Pathak who acted in the film Once Upon A Time In Mumbaai and filmmaker Kunal Singh.
- January 2016 –The NGO organized a Summit on ‘The Art of Living for Sustainable Tomorrow’ for 300 school principals in Mumbai. The Summit was attended by Hon’ble Education Minister of Maharashtra - Shri Vinod Tawde, Shri. Adv. Ashish Shelar - Hon’ble President of BJP, Mumbai and Indian actress Ms. Juhi Chawla

== Awards ==
- February 2016 – Won the ‘Global NGO Excellence Award’ for outstanding contribution in the field of education for sustainability
