= John Somers Payne =

Irish sailor (1926–2013)

- Born: 25 January 1926; County Cork, Ireland
- Died: 24 April 2013 (aged 87); Mercy University Hospital, Cork, Ireland
- Other name: 'Somers'
- Occupation: Insurance manager
- Notable work: Double Olympian, 16th place at Melbourne Olympics 1956 and 18th place at Rome Olympics 1960
- Height: 175 cm (5 ft 9 in)
- Spouse: Eithne Payne
- Children: 4

John Somers Payne (pronunciation: dʒon somɘɹz peɪn; 25 January 1926 – 24 April 2013) was an Irish sport sailor, doyen of Cork Harbour Sailing and two-time Olympian. Payne competed as a member of the Irish National sailing teams in November 1956 and again at the August 1960 Olympics. In the 1956 Olympic Games in Melbourne Payne competed in the Men's Finn single-handed dinghy category and placed 16th. Four years later at the Olympic Games held off the coast of Naples, Italy, he competed in the same category and placed 18th, in what was his final sailing competition. John Somers Payne, also simply known as 'Somers' was often described by family and friends as an ‘inspiration’, as he was one of the first individuals from the coastal Cork village of Crosshaven to sail into the olympics.

== Early life ==
John Somers Payne was born on 25 January 1926 in County Cork, Ireland. He comes from a well-known Munster family, originating from the small coastal village of Crosshaven, County Cork. Payne was raised in a household where sailing was a natural part of life. When he was born, his father had earned the title of a prominent international medallist in the International 12s, and was recognised as one of Cork Harbour's most talented helmsman.

== Family life ==
John Somers Payne was born into a well-known sailing family in Cork. His father, Captain Jimmy Payne won the World Dingy Championship in 1924, just two years before John was born. This meant that sailing was a natural part of his everyday life while growing up and ultimately lead to him winning more National 18 titles than any other captain. He went on to marry Gladys Daunt before remarrying Eithne Busteed They had four children.

== Career ==
Image of a National 12 class Dinghy

Growing up in a highly acknowledged Munster sailing family, Payne knew his way around a boat. He belonged to The Royal Cork Yacht Club and was a respected sailor of Cork Harbor. He competed in the Finn Single-handed Dinghy event at the 1956 Olympics in Melbourne and again in the 1960 Olympics in Rome. Having to work very hard to get to the Olympics, Payne came 16th at the 1956 Olympics and 18th at the 1960 Olympics both in the mixed one-person dinghy event. In 1946, the International 12 Foot Dinghy was the biggest dinghy class in Ireland, which Payne would have been considered a national and international star. Later, Payne would have carried on to win more National 18 class titles than any other captain, and has listed many Admiral's Cup in his accomplishments.

== Later life and death ==
An Olympian named John Somers Payne known to be a doyen of the Cork Harbor sailing. Payne died on 24 April 2013 at the age of eighty-seven, being a member of a well-known Munster sailing family.

He was given the nickname ‘Jimmy’ Payne by friends and family. Payne died in the care of the Mercy University Hospital, after living a long healthy life. Payne is the dearest husband of Eithne and the late Gladys. He was a loving father to one boy and two girls Leslie, Jackie, Jenny (children of Gladys) and one boy James (son of Eithne) as well as grandfather to Tom, Patricia, Indy, Lorchan and Euan.

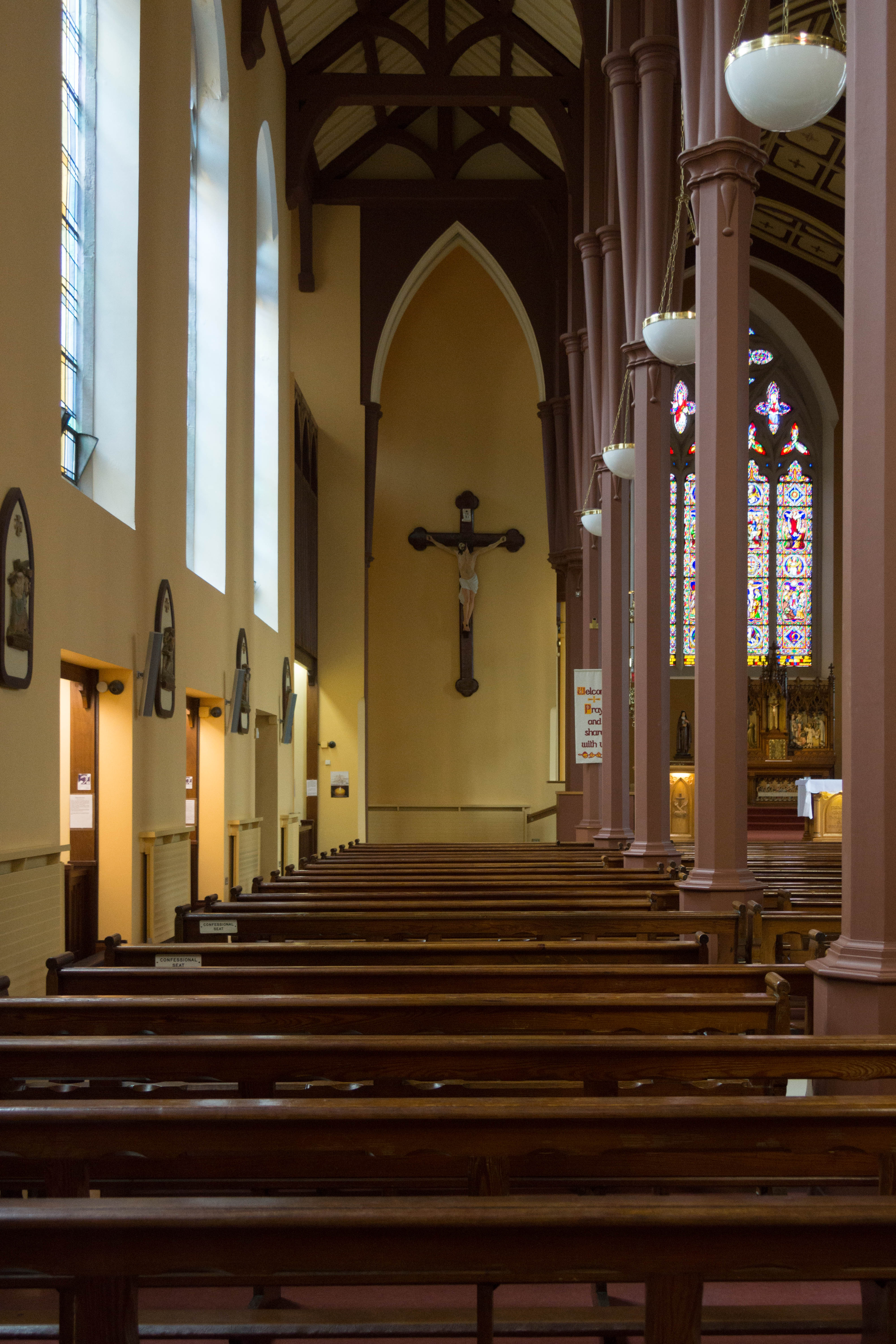
The transept section in the Holy Trinity Church, County Cork

The reception for John Somers Payne was held in Holy Trinity Church, Crosshaven, County Cork on 26 April 2013. Following the reception for Payne, his funeral was then held on 27 April 2013 at twelve midday and the burial then took place in St. Patrick's Cemetery in Crosshaven.

== Legacy ==
Coming from a well-established Cork sailing family, John Somers Payne did not fall short when it came to creating his own legacy. Over his many decades in competitive sailing, starting in his teens and sailing into his late 70's, John Somers Payne competed in many prestigious competitions across the globe, including the Olympics, The Admirals Cup and the National Eighteen Class.

John Somers Payne's most recognised sailing legacy is that of his participation in the Olympic Games in both 1956 and 1960, however, it is not only his sailing in these competitions which created his legacy but his dedication to participating in the games. ‘In the run up to the Melbourne Olympics, in 1955 Payne walked from Heuston Station (then Kingsbridge) in Dublin city to Malahide for the trials, some 20km, after missing his bus.', Somers Payne proceeded to win this trial, however, the Irish Yachting Association insisted he must also attend a sailing event in the Netherlands before qualifying for the Olympic team. The event was a Finn event, and Somers Payne attended at his own expense, again showing his great dedication to Irish sailing.

Somers Payne also had many successful meetings in the Admirals Cup tournament, but more importantly to him, the National Eighteen race. This race was held in Cork harbour and was close to Somers Payne's heart throughout his life, Payne went on to win more titles in this competition than any other skipper, showing real skill throughout his years of National Eighteen competing.

John Somers Payne has left a huge mark on his home sailing club the Royal Cork Yacht Club. As well as bringing home many awards and wins to the club, Somers Payne also inspired many young sailors in the club. Following his death in 2013, The Irish Times spoke to Mark Mansfield who said, "Somers was an inspiration to us all at Royal Cork Yacht Club because he was one of the first from Crosshaven to sail in the Olympics."

== See also ==
- Sailing at the 1956 Summer Olympics
- Sailing at the 1960 Summer Olympics
