= Len Rempt-Halmmans de Jongh =

Dutch politician

Nellie (Len) Rempt-Halmmans de Jongh (Utrecht, 11 August 1927 - Huizen, 26 April 2013) was a Dutch politician, who was a member of the House of Representatives from 1975 to 1979, 1982–1989, and 1990–1994.

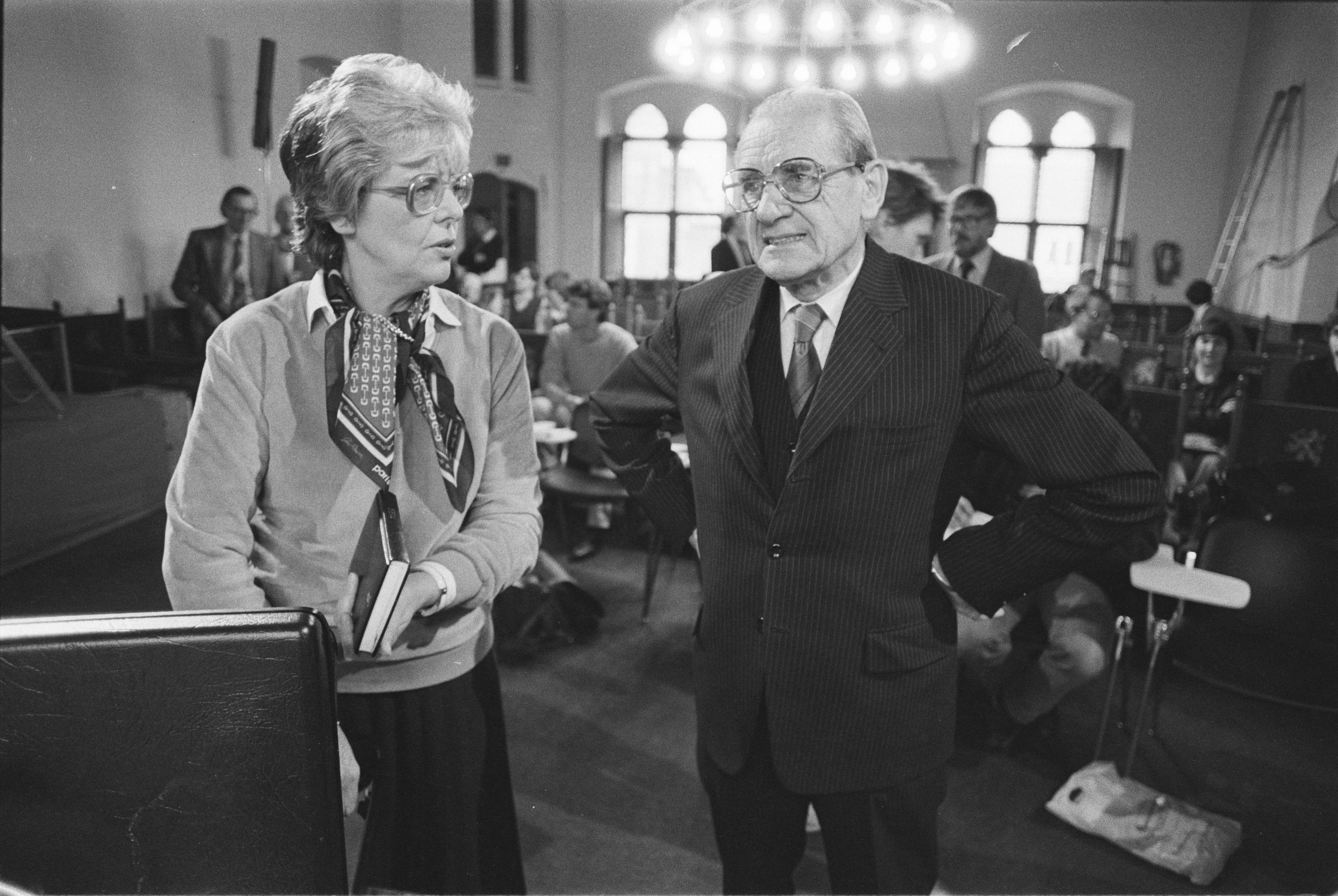
Rempt-Halmmans de Jongh (left) in 1984
