= Dhoodaan =

Cabdullahi Macallin Axmed, Dhoodaan (born 1941 in Dollo Zone Died April 2013) was a Somali poet.

== Biography ==
A well-known Somali poet, Abdullahi Moalin Ahmed “Dhoodaan” died aged 72 in the city of Harar. He was one of the pioneers of Somali language poetry and arguably one of the greatest poets of the last century. He was born within a family of shepherds from the Somaali Galbeed. He did not have a formal education.
