= Jadene Felina Stevens =

American poet

Jadene Felina (Acciavatti) Stevens (1947–2013) was an American poet.

== Biography ==
As a native to the Boston area, she began writing poetry at a young age. Stevens was the founder and director of The Saltwinds Poets, based on Cape Cod. In 2013, her book Across the Hedge: Calling on Emily Dickinson (Encircle Publications, LLC) was published posthumously. Other works by Stevens include Witches: The Voices of Three Women Accused (1997) and The Original Trinity (1994).

Her poetry has appeared in Yankee Magazine, The Christian Science Monitor, Cape Women Online Magazine, Pedestal Magazine, Muddy River Poetry Review, Brevities, The Aurorean, Prairie Schooner, Transnational Perspectives (Switzerland), Psychopoetica, and Doors Out of Dorset (England).

Her poems and prose have also been included in a number of anthologies: Crossing Boundaries - An International Anthology of Women's Experiences in Sport, edited by Susan J. Bandy, Anne S. Darden (1999), Heartbeat of New England: An Anthology of Contemporary Nature Poems, edited by James Fowler, and World of Water, World of Sand by Cape Women Creating and Shank Painter Press.

She was co-editor and layout designer of the cover art for the Cape Cod Community College Poetry Anthology, Dancing On Water (2002), which included not only student/staff poems, but work from such poets as Martin Espada and Nikki Giovanni. She also designed, laid out and edited a chapbook for Cape Cod Community College’s “Festival of Cultural Diversity,” Common Roots, Common Ground (2001), which also included work by students, staff, and noted poets. Stevens was editor and layout/production designer for an anthology titled, Village Poets of Sandwich, numerous chapbooks for First Night, Chatham, and many more chapbooks.

== Death and legacy ==
On April 13, 2013, Jadene died after a long bout with cancer. In 2013, the 19th edition of the Phi Theta Kappa's Nota Bene publication was dedicated to Stevens, in recognition of her contributions to the society and the poetry world.

== Awards and honors ==
Stevens has been a three-time consecutive winner of the Phi Theta Kappa Nota Bene International Literary Awards (poetry), a three-time consecutive winner of the Phi Theta Kappa Regional Literary Awards (poetry), and received PTK’s highest award, the International Citation Award (1997). She has won several awards in the Writers Digest Poetry Competitions, The New England Poetry Club Poetry Competitions, The Arkansas Writer’s Conference Awards, The Katherine Lee Bates Poetry Competitions, as well as others.

== Works ==
- Across the Hedge: Calling on Emily Dickinson (Encircle Publications, 2013)
- Witches: The Voices of Three Women Accused (Saltwinds Press, 1997)
- The Original Trinity: A Trilogy of The Goddess (Stepping Stone Press, 1994)
- "The President Said" (The Pedestal Magazine)
