= Araber Rahaman =

Indian politician

Araber Rahaman (died 28 April 2013) was an Indian politician. He was the Tripura MLA for Boxanagar from 1978 to 1988.
