= Pepe Ozan =

Argentine sculptor, artistic director and filmmaker

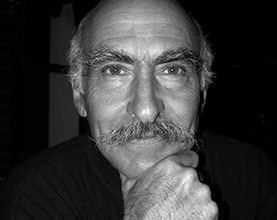
- Born: Pepe Ozan; 31 January 1939; Mendoza, Argentina
- Died: 8 April 2013 (aged 74); Argentina
- Known for: Sculptor, art director, and filmmaker

Pepe Ozan (1939–2013) was an Argentine sculptor, artistic director, and filmmaker. He lived in the San Francisco Bay Area for many years, and is known for his lasting influence at Burning Man, an annual experimental arts festival in Nevada, United States.

== Biography ==
=== Burning Man operas ===
Ozan directed several large-scale ritual performance art pieces, at the Burning Man Arts Festival between 1996 and 2002. Starting in 1994 he created a series of operas which grew to encompass 200 participants and 30 musicians performing for an audience of 50000. He created The Arrival of Empress Zoe (1996), The Daughters of Ishtar (1997), The Temple of Rudra (1998), Le Mystere de Papa Loko, a ritual performance based on Haitian Voodoo (1999). The Thar-Taurs of Atlan (2000) and The Ark of the Nereids (2002)

In addition to founding the Burning Man Opera, Pepe designed and constructed his sculptures, which served as the stage for the performances. At the climax of each performance, the stage was dramatically set on fire and burned to the ground.

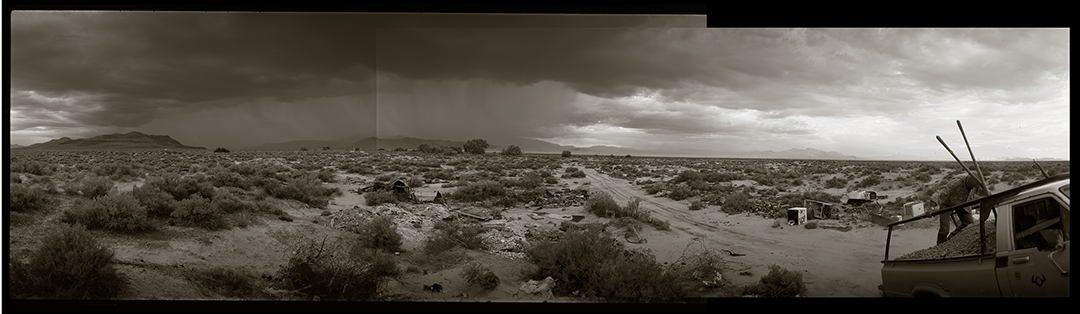
This image was taken in 1998 and shows Pepe Ozan and Leo Nash unloading the remnants of the Temple of Rudra at a dump beyond the edge of the playa.

=== Sculptures and designs ===
In 1988 Pepe Ozan met Todd Wilson and together they created a successful furniture design company, Enos Metalworks. The style of polished curved metal furniture was a signature of their design. Enos Metalworks also designed several retail projects for the GAP, Banana Republic, and in collaboration with Seidman Woodworks designed Eye Gotcha Optometry in the Castro district of San Francisco.

In 2004 the San Francisco Art Commission sponsored Pepe to create a public sculpture entitled "Invocation", located at Cesar Chavez St. between Vermont St. and Francisco St. The piece represents an Eagle-Warrior, an institution that survived 2000 years in Mesoamerican civilizations until the arrival of the conquistadores. This Eagle Warrior is invoking the gods.

In 2005 Burning Man through its Black Rock Arts Foundation commissioned Pepe to create "The Dreamer" as part of its theme, Psyche. The half submerged head has an entry into the inside of the head where neurons and biological matter dangle. With support from the Black Rock Arts Foundation and the James Irvine Foundation, "The Dreamer" was exhibited in the open from May to November 2007 at the Golden Gate Park in San Francisco.

In 2006, Pepe created these playful sculptures at times measuring up to 14 feet tall. The Monicacos de Esperanza were made out of wire mesh, fiberglass and polymer resin. From June through December 2006, the Monicacos de Esperanza were exhibited out in the open on San Francisco's Blue Greenway. The dedication of Pepe's Monicacos de Esperanza and a celebration of the launch of the Blue Greenway took place on June 24, 2006 with Mayor Gavin Newsom. From December 2006 to January 2007 a flock of Pepe's Monicacos de Esperanza were exhibited at the San Jose Museum of Art.

=== Films ===
In 2002 Pepe Ozan and Melitta Tchaicovsky directed this 58 minute documentary, Ganga Ma, a Pilgrimage to the Source, following the holy pilgrimage of the Hindus from the Bay of Bengal up to the Himalayan glaciers through the Ganges River. The film received the following awards: Award Winner - Best Documentary, Taos Film Festival 2002, Award Winner - Director's Citation Black Maria Film Festival 2002, Official Selection - Santa Cruz Film Festival 2002, Official Selection - Latino International Film Festival 2002, Official Selection Kathmandu International Mountain Film Festival.

In 2004 Pepe Ozan and Melitta Tchaicovsky directed a 54-minute documentary, Jaisalmer Ayo, Gateway of the Gypsies, capturing the lives and travels of vanishing nomadic communities from the Thar Desert and exploring their ancestral links with the European Roma or Gypsies. It received the Best Documentary award at the San Francisco Video Fest 2004 and appeared at many film festivals.

Julio Ozan Lavoisier Pepe's brother, Julio Ozan Lavoisier, writer and philosopher, had studied the culture of India for many years. Pepe Ozan had already made two documentaries in India, the first entitled Jaisalmer Ayo! (2004) and the second Ganga Ma (2001). The brothers decided to unite in order the express in audiovisual form Indian tradition and culture. The documentary feature: "The Hindus" was created. As of 2014, editing continued on the film.

== Death ==
In March 2013, Ozan lost his art studio in San Francisco, and shortly after he decided to move back to his family home in Argentina. He developed an intestinal infection and in the Argentine hospital he was diagnosed with cancer. He died on 8 April 2013, at the age of 73.
