= James Fitzgerald (English cricketer) =

English cricketer

Personal information
- Born: 28 November 1945; Sutton Coldfield, Warwickshire, England
- Died: 21 April 2013 (aged 67); Windsor, England
- Source: ESPNcricinfo, 9 May 2016

James Francis Fitzgerald (28 November 1945 – 21 April 2013) was an English cricketer. He played fifteen first-class matches for Cambridge University Cricket Club between 1966 and 1968.

== See also ==
- List of Cambridge University Cricket Club players
