= Saleem Pervez =

Pakistani cricketer (1947–2013)

Cricket information
- Batting: Right-handed
- Bowling: Right-arm medium-fast

International information
- National side: Pakistan

Career statistics
Competition	ODI
Matches	1
Runs scored	18
Batting average	18.00
100s/50s	0/0
Top score	18
Catches/stumpings	0/–
- Source: Cricinfo, 3 May 2006

Saleem Pervez (9 September 1947 – 24 April 2013) was a Pakistani cricketer who played his only One Day International for the national team in 1980. He was born at Lahore in 1947.

Pervez was involved in the match-fixing controversy into which Judge Malik Mohammad Qayyum held an inquiry in the late 1990s. In September 1998, he testified in the inquiry, admitting to acting as an intermediary between Pakistani players and bookies. According to the Qayyum report, Pervez confessed to giving Salim Malik and Mushtaq Ahmed $100,000 to fix a match in Sharjah. This inquiry was initiated following allegations by Australian players Shane Warne, Tim May, and Mark Waugh, who claimed that Salim Malik had offered them a bribe during a 1994 series against Pakistan. Warne denied knowing Saleem Pervez. Although Pervez was implicated, no charges were proven against him.
