= Norris Hundley =

American historian

Norris Cecil Hundley, Jr.
- Born: October 26, 1935; Houston, Texas, USA
- Died: April 28, 2013 (aged 77); Montecito, California, USA
- Spouse: Carol Marie Beckquist (1957–2013)
- Children: Wendy Harris; Jacqueline Reid

Academic background
- Education: Whittier College (A.B. 1958); UCLA (Ph.D. 1963)

Norris Cecil Hundley, Jr. (October 26, 1935 – April 28, 2013) was an American academic, historian, and writer, best known for his 1992 book, The Great Thirst, which details the history of water usage in California from 1770 to the 1990s. Both as a historian and an academic, Hundley was renowned for inventing the professional history of water rights in the Western United States

== Early life ==
Hundley was born on October 26, 1935, in Houston, Texas, as the eldest of six children of Norris and Helen Hundley. He attended San Gabriel Mission High School, which is where he met his wife, Carol Marie Beckquist, whom he married in 1957. After high school, Hundley attended Mount San Antonio College, which he graduated from in 1956. He then attended Whittier College, where he graduated in 1958, and later on, he received his Ph.D. in History from UCLA in 1963.

== Academic career ==
After receiving his Ph.D. from UCLA, Hundley taught at the University of Houston from 1963 to 1964 before returning to UCLA as a professor in 1964. Hundley retired emeritus professor of History in 1994.

Other than his work as an academic professor, Hundley contributed various scholarly articles on the West, especially pertaining to the history of water and natural resource usage. Two of his scholarly articles merited the Historical Quarterly’s Oscar A. Winther Prize, and he has been awarded grants from the Ford Foundation, the National Endowment for the Humanities, and the Guggenheim Foundation.

From 1968 to 1997 Hundley was the editor of the Pacific Historical Review, an academic journal focusing on American expansion to the American West and the Pacific. During his tenure, he was instrumental in shaping the fields of environmental science, ethnic studies, and the history of the American West and the Pacific Rim. Hundley would often be awarded for editing articles in western history or conservation history To honor his commitment to academia, the Pacific Coast Branch of the American Historical Association created "The Norris and Carol Hundley Award", which awards $750 to the "most distinguished book" written by an academic in the trans-Mississippi West and Western Canada.

Apart from his work at the PHR, Hundley served as the president of the Pacific Coast Branch of the American Historical Association from 1994 to 1995, the Chair of the UCLA Program on Mexico from 1982 to 1994, the director of the UCLA Latin American Center from 1989 to 1994 and from 1994 to 1997, and as 34th President of the Western History Association from 1994 to 1995.

== Personal life ==
In 1954, Norris Hundley met Carol Marie Beckquist when they were both students at San Gabriel Mission High School. They married on June 8, 1957, and raised two daughters. Hundley was Catholic.

== Death ==
Norris Hundley died in Montecito, California, on April 28, 2013, at the age of 77. He was survived by his wife, two daughters, six younger siblings, and six grandchildren.

== Academic works ==
- Dividing the Waters: A Century of Controversy between the United States and Mexico (1966, trans. Spanish, 2000)
- Water and the West: The Colorado River Compact and the Politics of Water in the American West (1975)
- The Great Thirst: Californians and Water, 1770s-1990s (1992, rev. 2001)
- California: History of a Remarkable State (4th ed.; Prentice-Hall 1982)
