= Zachariah Alpheus Mahlomola Molotsi =

South African politician

Member of the Provincial Legislature
- In office 19 February 2011 – ?

Personal details
- Born: January 19, 1953
- Died: April 11, 2013 (aged 60)
- Political party: African National Congress

Zachariah Alpheus Mahlomola Molotsi (January 19, 1953 – April 11, 2013) was a South African politician. Molotsi was sworn in as a member of the Provincial Legislature on 19 February 2011 and was appointed the Whip of the African National Congress in the legislature on March 1, 2011. He was also the chairman of the Standing Committee on Petitions.
