= Giyani Community Radio =

Giyani Community Radio Station
South Africa
- Broadcast area: Vhembe, Mutale Local Municipality and Makhado Local Municipality, Limpopo
- Frequency: Multiple

Ownership
- Owner: Greater Giyani Local Municipality

History
- First air date: 1 July 2013

Links
- Website: www.gcrfm.co.za

Giyani Community Radio station (106mhz-FM)(Giyani Community Radio station) is an Organization and a community radio station established by Greater Giyani community. It is located at the town of Giyani under the Greater Giyani Local Municipality. The station has a 50 km broadcasting radius which covers the following areas:Greater Giyani Local Municipalityarea, Vhembe District and Mopani District Municipality, Mutale Local Municipality, North of Kruger National Park on the eastern side and Makhado Local Municipality the South, Southern, Eastern, Western and Northern parts.

== History GCR-FM ==
The station broadcasts in Xitsonga 50%, English 10%, Tshivenda 20%, and Northern Sotho 20%. The GCR is created by collective community and civil society calling for more rigorous community participation corporate governance unheard of nationally. GCR was formed recently with the aim of providing exciting state of community radio. GCR is a community radio station that broadcast 24/7 on the 106 FM frequencies. It aired by July 2013. GCR was formed recently with the aim of providing exciting state of community radio. GCR will provide its services to the surrounding communities and general publicly contributes to community development, by addressing community, national and global issues, challenges and opportunities. The station ensures that individuals in these communities have access to knowledge that empowers them to live lives that are based on fundamental human values. GCR showcase a unique community radio model of civil society leadership in terms of corporate governance and community broadcasting service.

== Coverage & Frequencies ==
Coverage Areas & Frequencies
Area	Freq. MHz
Giyani Greater Municipality	106.0
Mopani District Municipality	106.0
Mutale Local Municipality	106.0
Vhembe	106.0
Kruger National Park	106.0
Makhado Local Municipality	106.0

== Listenership Figures ==
Estimated Listenership
	7 Day	Ave. Mon-Fri
May 2018	1 100 000	700 00
Feb 2017	1 100 00	670 00
Jan 2016	1 99 00	690 00
Feb 2015	1 96 00	696 00
Jan 2014	1 00	650 00
Jun 2013	1 00	6 00

== Target Audience ==
- Age group 16 – 24 (43%
- Age group 25 – 34 (20%)
- Age group 35 – 49 (21%)
- Female (50%
- Male (50%)
- LSM 1-5 (46.6%)
- LSM 6-10 (10.9%)

== Broadcast time ==
- 24/7

== GCR line Up Programs ==
=== Monday to Friday ===
- From 06:00-09:00 Big Breakfast Zone (BBZ) by Big Change & Xiluva
- From 09:00-12:00 MID-morning Drive by Ntwanano Vuma
- From 12:00-15:00 GCR TALK by Hlawulani Mabasa
- From 15:00-18:00 BUMPER RELOADED by Don & Lady Vee
- From 18:00-19:00 TA MIGANGA by Lunghile
- From 19:00-20:00 SPORT VILL by Tonny waka Khosa
- From 20:00-22:00 A HI CHONGOLENI by MK Mathonsi
- From 22:00-00:00 TALE MBILWINI by The Junior
- From 00:00-03:00 Xintshuxo by Star Dzunie
- From 03:00-06:00 MORNING BIRDS by MK Mathonsi

=== GCR Saturdays Program ===
- FROM 06:00-09:00 WEEKEND BREAKFAST by MissK
- FROM 09:00-12:00 XITSONG TOP 20 BY Inspector Bizo
- FROM 12:00-15:00 REGGAE SPECIAL By The Jnr
- FROM 15:00-16:00 JAZZ BEAT by Bligh
- FROM 18:00-21:00 HOUSE TOP 20 by Inspector Bizo
- FROM 21:00-00:00 TA XIGAZA Mhlengwe
- FROM 00:00-03:00 Ziyawa By Bligh
- FROM 03:00-06:00 MORNING BIRDS by Sunday Kubayi

=== GCR Sunday Program ===
- 06:00-09:00 PRAISE & WORSHIP by Ntwanano Vuma
- 09:00-10:00 AWARA YA NTIYISO by Pastor James
- 10:00-13:00 CHURCH SERVICE by Ntsaki Nwa Honwani
- 13:00-15:00 RELIGIOUS TALK by Sunday
- 15:00-18:00 XITSONGA GOSPEL REVIVAL BY Stardzun
- 18:00-19:00 AWARA YA KUTSHUXIWA BY Pastors
- 19:00-21:00 REASONING FROM BIBLE BY Bligh
- 21:00-00:00 GOSPEL TOP 20 BY Sunday Kubayi
- 00:00-03:00 ZIYAWA by Bligh
- 03:00-06:00 MORNING BIRDS BY Sunday
