= Fakhrul Islam =

Pakistani politician (died 2013)

Fakhrul Islam (died April 11, 2013) was a Pakistani politician.

== Death ==
On April 11, 2013, he was shot at the age of 46.
