= Channa Horwitz =

American artist

Channa Horwitz (née Channa Helene Shapiro, aka "Channa Davis" and "Channa Davis Horwitz", May 21, 1932 – April 29, 2013) was a contemporary artist based in Los Angeles, United States. She is recognized for the logically derived compositions created over her five-decade career. Her visually complex, systematic works are generally structured around linear progressions using the number eight.

== Early life and education ==
Horwitz was born in Boyle Heights, Los Angeles, on May 21, 1932; her father was an electrician and inventor. She studied at Art Center School of Design 1950–52. She married Marshall Davis in 1952 and had her first daughter, Ellen, in 1954 and her second daughter, Toni, in 1956. Toni died in 1979 impacting Channa and her family deeply. As a married mother of two, she studied painting at California State University Northridge (1960–63) while living in Tarzana. At CSUN she was encouraged by her instructors to paint in an Abstract Expressionist style, to "be free" and "throw the paint." In 1965, she had a third child, Marshall. She earned a B.F.A. in 1972 from CalArts, studying under her colleagues, teachers John Baldessari and Allan Kaprow, among others. She separated from her first husband in 1971 and married her second husband, Jim Horwitz, in 1973.

== Early work ==
In 1964, already deconstructing form and doing large, hard-edged oil paintings, using limited motif and basic geometric shapes, Horwitz developed in sketches what came to be known as her "Language Series" body of work which she later began actualizing in 2003. She combined circles, squares and rectangles with sequential numbers, 1 through 8, to create compositions. Horwitz arranged these compositions into linear progressive patterns based on the corresponding numbers. She felt that by reducing the choices she had, she was able to search for the essence of form. "As an artist I experience freedom through limitation and structure. It would appear that limitation and structure are dichotomies to freedom, but through experience I have found them to be synonymous and the basis of freedom." This approach continued to inform her inquiry and subsequent bodies of work.

Also in 1964 Horwitz started a series of architectural interior renderings for a fictitious couple named, “Mr. and Mrs. McGillicutty.” Each rendering was composed of basic interior elements including a window and a window-blind. Horwitz lost interest in all other elements of the series, save for the varied positioning of the window-blinds. Altering the position of the blinds was another early indication of Horwitz's inquiry into systems and sequences and their variety of patterns.

Black and White, Circle and Square (1966): By 1966 She did away with all narrative pretexts and reduced her vocabulary to just black and white and the circle and the square. With four simple rules governing her process, Horwitz composed sixteen paintings in the Circle and Square series. The four rules were: “1) Randomly position two rectangles (on large one small) against a broad field. 2) Draw a circle around the circumference of each of the rectangles. 3) Draw a circle in the center of the entire frame. 4) Color the portion of each rectangle falling outside circle number 3 a darker shade.”

In this manner Horwitz came to her own, self-derived, version of minimalism. In the early years of her practice, as she worked out her system of representation, Horwitz was fairly isolated and unfamiliar with Sol LeWitt and other conceptualists working in the same vein.

== The Art and Technology exhibition and Sonakinatography ==
In 1968, Horwitz (then Channa Davis) submitted a proposal to the innovative exhibition Art and Technology (1971), in which artists were paired with technology companies and engineers, at the Los Angeles County Museum of Art. The proposed sculpture consisted of "eight large clear Plexiglas beams designed to move and float in the air within magnetic fields, accompanied by eight beams of light that would vary in intensity based on the adjacent beam." The movement would occur in ten minute cycles. Although the sculpture was never fabricated, Horwitz's proposal was included in the 1970 program catalogue, whose cover prominently displayed the faces of the white male artists whose works appeared in the culminating exhibition at the Museum. Art and Technology's glaring omission of women—specifically the fact that Horwitz was never asked to speak with industry about the possibility of making her sculpture led to a public outcry in the feminist art community in Los Angeles, involving confrontations and eventual concessions from the curator Maurice Tuchman.

Not long after submitting the Art and Technology proposal, Horwitz continued her interest in representing motion across time. She asked her then-husband for a break from a tennis match to spend two hours drawing, and during this period invented a system of composition called Sonakinatography, meaning sound – motion – notation. Sonakinatography plots the activity of eight entities over a period of time using numbers, colors, and the eight-to-the-inch squares of the graph paper they appear on. While conceptually complete ends in themselves, and visually appealing in their own right as standalone drawings, Sonakinatography compositions have also been performed via percussion, dance, spoken word, lights, and electronic instruments.

Because of the initial choice of eight-to-the-inch graph paper for Sonakinatography, Horwitz has used the number eight consistently through her work, as she expands and varies her original systems into new sequences and series.

Subsequent bodies of work which were outgrowths of each prior series and her deepening inquiry, include "To the Top", "Variations and Inversion on a Rhythm", "Eight", "Canon Series", "Moiré", "Subliminal", "Variance", Rhythm of Lines", and "Angle of Lines" Series, "Design Series", and "Language Series l, ll, and lll".

== Current representation ==
Although for the most part publicly ignored throughout her career, Horwitz's work has been gaining recognition in recent years. She is currently represented by Ghebaly Gallery and Lisson Gallery. Horwitz has commented that this lack of public involvement has likely given her the freedom to pursue and question the directions in which the structures of her work take her.

She has recently had solo exhibitions at the He Museum, (Guandong, China), MUSAC, (León, Spain), Ghebaly Gallery (Los Angeles), Contemporary Art Gallery (Vancouver, Canada), Lisson Gallery (New York and London), Raven Row (London, England), KW Institute for Contemporary Art (Berlin), Air de Paris (France). She was included in group exhibitions at the Museum of Modern Art (New York), Inhotim (Brazil), Museum Tinguely (Switzerland), Los Angeles County Museum of Art, the Hammer Museum (Los Angeles), the New Museum (New York), ZKM Karlsruhe and Kunsthalle Dresden (Germany), and Centro Galego de Arte Contemporánea (Spain), the 55th Venice Biennale (2013), and the Whitney Biennial 2014. She has upcoming events across the US and Europe. She received the honor of a Guggenheim Fellowship shortly before her death in April, 2013.

== Selected solo exhibitions ==
- 2023: "Channa Horwitz, Rhythm Intertwined", He Museum, Guandong, China
- 2022: "Channa Horwitz". Lisson Gallery, Shanghai, China
- 2022: "Channa Horwitz", Lisson Gallery, New York, NY, USA
- 2021: "The Language Series", François Ghebaly, Los Angeles, CA, USA
- 2020: "Channa Horwitz", Lisson Gallery, East Hampton, NY, USA
- 2019: "Rules of the Game", Lisson Gallery, London, England
- 2018 "Channa Horwitz" Lisson Gallery, New YOrk, NY
- 2018: "The Factor Eight", MUSAC, Spain,
- 2018: "Structures", Ghebaly Gallery, Los Angeles, CA,
- 2018: "Channa Horwitz – Progressions and Rhythms in Eight", CAG, Vancouver, Canada
- 2018: "Sonakinatography", Lisson Gallery, New York, NY
- 2016: "Inbox: Channa Horwitz" The Museum of Modern Art, New York, NY
- 2016: "To the Top", Ghebaly Gallery, Los Angeles, CA
- 2016: "Channa Horwitz", Raven Row, London, England
- 2015: "Playing in Time", Air de Paris, Paris, France
- 2015: "Counting in Eight, Moving by Color, KW Institute for Contemporary Art, Berlin, Germany
- 2013: "Orange Grid", François Ghebaly Gallery, Los Angeles, CA
- 2012: "Poem Opera / The Divided Person", (Performance), High Line Park, New York, NY, USA
- 2012: "Variations of Sonakinatography lll", Pacific Standard Time, The Annenberg, Los Angeles, CA, USA
- 2011: "Displacement", curated by Marc Glöde, Y8, Hamburg
- 2011: "What Would Happen If I", Aanant & Zoo, Berlin
- 2010: "Hello is not like I would say goodbye" Aanant & Zoo, Berlin
- 2010: "Sequences and Systems", SolwayJones, Los Angeles
- 2009: "Variations in Counting One Through Eight", Brandenburgischer Kunstverein Potsdam e.V, Potsdam
- 2009: "Searching/Structures 1960-2007", Aanant & Zoo, Berlin
- 2007: "Variances", SolwayJones, Los Angeles
- 2005: "Language Series", Solway Jones, Los Angeles, CA, USA
- 1999: "Structures", University of Judaism, Platt Gallery, Los Angeles, CA, USA
- 1990: "Paintings’, The Drawing Room, Tucson, AZ, USA (curated by Malinda Wyatt)
- 1988: "Paintings and Drawings", Los Angeles Municipal Art Gallery (LAMAG), Los Angeles
- 1983: "Drawings and Prints", Malinda Wyatt Gallery, Venice, CA, USA
- 1981: "Drawings and Prints", Malinda Wyatt Gallery, Venice, CA, USA
- 1978: Performance, International Performance Palazzo de Congressi, Bologna, Italy
- 1978: Performance, Ferrara, Sala Polivalente, Ferrara, Italy
- 1978: Performance, California Institute of Technology, Pasadena, CA, USA
- 1976: "Drawings and Performance", San Francisco Art Institute, San Francisco, CAUSA
- 1976: "Drawings", Nevada Art Gallery, Reno, NV, USA
- 1974: "Drawings", Woman’s Building, Los Angeles Drawings, University of California, Irvine, CA, USA
- 1973: "Cal Arts, Orchestrated Stairwell 1 + 2", Performance, California Institute of the Arts, Valencia, USA
- 1969" "Drawings, Sculptures, Multi-Media Performance’", Orlando Gallery, Encino, CA, USA
- 1964: "Paintings and Drawings", Valley Center of Art, Encino, CA, USA
- 1963: "Paintings", California State University Northridge, CA, USA

== Selected group exhibitions ==
- 2023: "Beijing Biennial", Beijing, China
- 2023: "Seoul Media City Biennial - Channa Horwitz, Orange Grid Room", Seoul, Korea
- 2023: "Coded: Art Enters the Computer Age, 1952-1982", Los Angeles County Museum of Art, Los Angeles, CA, USA
- 2023: "Schering Stiftung Collection at the Kupferstichkabinett", Staatlich Museum in Berlin
- 2023: "Irma Blank and Channa Horwitz", Galerie Hans Mayer, Düsseldorf, Germany
- 2023: "Forking Paths" - Max Goelitz Gallery, Munich Germany
- 2023: "ton not.not ton.", Kunsthalle, Münster, Münster, Germany
- 2023: "Treasures" from Barbara Smith's collection, The Box, Los Angeles, CA, USA
- 2023: "A Leap into the Void - Art Beyond Matter", Galleria d'Arte Moderna e Contemporanea di Bergamo, Bergamo, Italy
- 2022: "FUTURA: Measuring Time", Hamburger Kunsthalle, Hamburg, Germany
- 2021: "Recent Acquisitions: Modern and Contemporary Drawings and Prints", The Morgan Library, New York, NY, USA
- 2020: "Selected Works", Lisson Gallery, London, UK
- 2020: "The Botanical Mind: Art, Mysticism and the Cosmic Tree’, Camden Arts Centre, London, UK
- 2020: "Spectrum", Lisson Gallery, New York, NY, USA
- 2020: "Sound Art", Fundació Joan Miró, Barcelona, Spain
- 2019: "Geste", Centre National Édition Art Image, Pantin, France
- 2019: "Painted Diagrams: Bauhaus, Art and Infographic", Museum für Konkrete Kunst, Ingolstadt, Germany
- 2019: "Programmed: Rules, Codes, and Choreographies in Art, 1965–2018" Whitney Museum of American Art, New York, NY
- 2017: "Thinking Machines: Art and Design in the Computer Age", 1959–1989, The Museum of Modern Art, New York, NY, US
- 2017: "Strange Attractor" Ballroom Marfa, Marfa, Texas, US
- 2016: "The Promise of Total Automation, Kunsthalle Wien, Vienna, Austria
- 2016: "Poésie Balistique, La Verriére, Bruxelles, Belgium
- 2016: "Drawing Dialogues: The Sol Lewitt Collection", The Drawing Center, New York, NY, US
- 2016: "Performing the Grid", Otis College of Art and Design, Los Angeles, US
- 2015: "Haroon Mirza/hrm199 Ltd.", Museum Tinguely, Basel, Switzerland
- 2015: "Drawing in L.A.: The 1960s and 70s", Los Angeles County Museum of Art
- 2015: "From the Archives: Art and Technology at LACMA, 1967–1971", Los Angeles County Museum of Art
- 2015: "Do Objeto para o Mundo", a touring exhibition of The Centro de Arte Contemporânea Inhotim, Brazil
- 2014: "Lines" Hauser & Wirth, Zurich, Switzerland
- 2014: "Whitney Biennial, 2014", NYC, New York
- 2013: "55th Venice Biennale", Venice, Italy
- 2012: "Ghosts in the Machine", New Museum, New York
- 2012: "Made in L.A", Hammer Museum, Los Angeles
- 2012: "Papier / Papier II", Kunstgaleriebonn, Bonn
- 2012: "Systems and Structures", Galerie Casas Riegner, Bogota
- 2012: "How To Make – Ideen, Notationen, Materialisierungen", Kunsthaus Dresden, Dresden
- 2012: "Moments, Eine Geschichte der Performance in 10 Akten", ZKM Karlsruhe, Karlsruhe
- 2012: "Hanne Darboven und Channa Horwitz", Galerie Crone, Berlin
- 2008: "Zero", Aanant & Zoo, Berlin
