= Ijaz Mirza =

Pakistani cricketer (1941–2013)

Personal information
- Born: 14 May 1941; Delhi, India
- Died: 7 April 2013 (aged 71); Karachi, Pakistan
- Source: ESPNcricinfo, 10 June 2016

Ijaz Mirza (14 May 1941 – 7 April 2013) was a Pakistani cricketer. He played first-class cricket for Karachi and National Bank of Pakistan between 1962 and 1972. He also served as a selector of the Karachi City Cricket Association (KCCA).
