= Inner Circle of Advocates =

American organization of civil plaintiff trial lawyers

- Inner Circle of Advocates logo. The "7" refers to the seven-figure verdict originally required for membership
- Formation: 1972
- Founder: Richard Grand
- Type: legal organization
- Location: United States
- Members: By invitation
- Key people: Tyler S. Thompson, President

The Inner Circle of Advocates is an organization of civil plaintiff trial lawyers in the United States.

== History ==
The group was conceived and founded by Richard Grand in 1972. Membership was originally limited to 50 lawyers at any one time, later increased to 100 each of whom are lifetime members. The Inner Circle of Advocates inaugural meeting convened in San Francisco on June 26, 1972, with 11 lawyers in attendance. Situated at a circular table, the group exchanged ideas, marking its first roundtable.

To qualify for an invitation, initially, members must have won a physical injury or death case with a million-dollar verdict. later amended to having tried a minimum of 50 personal injury cases and won at least three million-dollar verdicts within the previous five years, one of which is in excess of $10 million.

The group solely admitted male members until 1990, when Judy Livingston became the first female member. The first woman president was Randi McGinns, in 2016; Livingston was elected president in 2022. In 2024, the organization's female membership was 13 percent.
