= Cory L. Richards =

American activist

- Born: 1948; Omaha, Nebraska, US
- Died: April 4, 2013 (aged 64); Washington, D.C., US
- Education: Yale University
- Employer: Guttmacher Institute
- Spouse: Douglas Mitchell (m. 2013)

Cory Lerner Richards (1948 – April 4, 2013) was an American activist for birth control and abortion rights. He worked for the Guttmacher Institute, which he first joined in 1975 as a policy analyst. He was appointed vice president for public policy in 1988, senior vice president in 2000, and executive vice president in 2008.

After graduating from Yale University in 1970, Richards worked for Peter Kyros, a Democratic U.S. Representative from Maine, which led him toward public health policy.

In 1994, Richards spearheaded the report Uneven and Unequal, which analyzed variability in insurance funding for birth control. In 1998, he founded the Guttmacher Policy Review, a quarterly journal that analyzes sexual and reproductive health and rights issues. The journal's statistical reporting and policy opinions have been cited by the U.S. Supreme Court and U.S. Congress.

Richards also volunteered with NARAL Pro-Choice America, the National Abortion Federation, National Family Planning and Reproductive Health Association (NFPRHA), and Sexuality Information and Education Council of the U.S. (SIECUS).

He died in 2013 (aged 64) of pancreatic cancer at the Washington Home and Community Hospice.
