= Makame Rashidi =

Tanzanian diplomat (1944–2013)

Major General Makame Mnalihinga Rashidi (1944 – 14 April 2013) was a Tanzanian military officer and diplomat, the Ambassador to Malawi (2004–2009), head of Ruvu Special Force, Chief of Staff of Military at Headquarters, Mbeya Regional Commissioner (1983–1989) and the head of Tanzania National Service (1989–2001). He joined TPDF(Tanzania People's Defense Force) in 1964 and served the military for more than 30 years before meeting his death at Lugalo Military Hospital in Dar es Salaam and buried at Mlyawa Village, Tandahimba in Mtwara Region.
