= Walter Nalangu =

Walter Nalangu (died 27 April 2013) was a Solomon Islander journalist and news editor. Nalangu served as the vice president of the Media Association of Solomon Islands (MASI) from 2009 until his death in 2013. He also held the position of editor in chief of news and current affairs at the Solomon Islands Broadcasting Corporation (SIBC).

Nalangu died from an asthma attack in Honiara, Solomon Islands, on 27 April 2013. His funeral was held at St. Barnabas Cathedral. Nalangu was buried in his home island of Mono within the Shortland Islands of Western Province.
