= 2012–13 in English football =

Football in England
- Season: 2012–13

Men's football
- Premier League: Manchester United
- Championship: Cardiff City
- League One: Doncaster Rovers
- League Two: Gillingham
- Conference Premier: Mansfield Town
- FA Cup: Wigan Athletic
- League Cup: Swansea City
- Community Shield: Manchester City

Women's football
- WSL: Liverpool
- FA Women's Premier League National Division: Sunderland
- FA Women's Premier League Northern Division: Sheffield
- FA Women's Premier League Southern Division: Reading
- FA Women's Cup: Arsenal
- WSL Cup: Arsenal

The 2012–13 season was the 133rd season of competitive football in England.

The season began on 11 August 2012 for the Football Conference and 18 August 2012 for both the Premier League and The Football League. The regular season of the Football Conference season ended on 20 April 2013 followed by League One and League Two both ending on 27 April 2013 whilst The Championship ended on 4 May 2013 and finally the Premier League on 19 May 2013.

== Promotion and relegation ==
=== Preseason ===
| League Division | Promoted to League ▲ | Relegated from League ▼ |
|---|---|---|
| Premier League | Reading ▲; Southampton ▲; West Ham United ▲ | Bolton Wanderers ▼; Blackburn Rovers ▼; Wolverhampton Wanderers ▼ |
| Championship | Charlton Athletic ▲; Sheffield Wednesday ▲; Huddersfield Town ▲ | Portsmouth ▼; Coventry City ▼; Doncaster Rovers ▼ |
| League One | Swindon Town ▲; Shrewsbury Town ▲; Crawley Town ▲; Crewe Alexandra ▲ | Chesterfield ▼; Exeter City ▼; Rochdale ▼; Wycombe Wanderers ▼ |
| League Two | Fleetwood Town ▲; York City ▲ | Hereford United ▼; Macclesfield Town ▼ |

=== Postseason ===
| League Division | Promoted to League ▲ | Relegated from League ▼ |
|---|---|---|
| Premier League | Cardiff City ▲; Hull City ▲; Crystal Palace ▲ | Wigan Athletic ▼; Reading ▼; QPR ▼ |
| Championship | Doncaster Rovers ▲; Bournemouth ▲; Yeovil Town ▲ | Peterborough United ▼; Wolverhampton Wanderers ▼; Bristol City ▼ |
| League One | Gillingham ▲; Rotherham United ▲; Port Vale ▲; Bradford City ▲ | Scunthorpe United ▼; Bury ▼; Hartlepool United ▼; Portsmouth ▼ |
| League Two | Mansfield Town ▲; Newport County ▲ | Barnet ▼; Aldershot Town ▼ |

== New clubs ==
- AFC Rushden & Diamonds, a new club formed and owned by fans of the defunct Rushden & Diamonds F.C., were accepted into the United Counties League Division One (level 10, Step 6).
- AFC Croydon Athletic, a new club formed and owned by fans of the defunct Croydon Athletic F.C., were accepted into the Combined Counties Football League Division One (level 10, Step 6)

== Clubs removed ==
- Witney Town F.C. from the Hellenic Football League Premier Division (level 9, step 5) were evicted from their ground in early February 2013 for failing to pay the rent. The club subsequently folded due to lack of funds.

== England national football team ==
=== 2014 FIFA World Cup qualification ===
| 7 September 2012 Matchday 1 | Moldova | 0–5 | England | Chişinău |
| 21:45 | Bulgaru (yellow card) 3' | Report | Lampard 4' (pen.), 29'; Johnson (yellow card) 5'; Defoe 32'; Milner 74'; Baines 84' | Stadium: Zimbru Stadium; Attendance: 10,250; Referee: (Netherlands) Pol Van Boekel |

| 11 September 2012 Matchday 2 | England | 1–1 | Ukraine | London |
| 20:00 | Lampard 87' (pen.); Defoe (yellow card) 47'; Gerrard (yellow card) 54' (yellow-red card) 88'; Lescott (yellow card) 70'; Milner (yellow card) 74'; Johnson (yellow card) 90+3' | Report | Konoplyanka 39'; Selin (yellow card) 56'; Harmash (yellow card) 79'; Khacheridi (yellow card) 86' | Stadium: Wembley Stadium; Attendance: 68,102; Referee: (Turkey) Cüneyt Çakır |

| 12 October 2012 Matchday 3 | England | 5–0 | San Marino | London |
| 20:00 | Rooney 35' (pen.), 69'; Welbeck 38', 71'; Oxlade-Chamberlain 77' | Report | Simoncini (yellow card) 35'; Rinaldi (yellow card) 65' | Stadium: Wembley Stadium; Attendance: 85,654; Referee: (Lithuania) Gediminas Mažeika |

| 17 October 2012 Matchday 4 | Poland | 1–1 | England | Warsaw |
| 16:00 | Glik 70', (yellow card) 65'; Polanski (yellow card) 11' | Report | Rooney 31'; Cole (yellow card) 38' | Stadium: National Stadium; Attendance: 43,000; Referee: (Italy) Gianluca Rocchi |

| 22 March 2013 Matchday 5 | San Marino | 0–8 | England | Serravalle |
| 20:00 | Simoncini (yellow card) 53' | Report | Della Valle 12' (o.g.); Oxlade-Chamberlain 28'; Defoe 35', 77'; Young 39'; Lampard 42'; Rooney 54'; Sturridge 70' | Stadium: Stadio Olimpico; Attendance: 4,952; Referee: (Switzerland) Alain Bieri |

| 26 March 2013 Matchday 6 | Montenegro | 1–1 | England | Podgorica |
| 20:00 | Novaković (yellow card) 28'; Volkov (yellow card) 63'; Damjanović 76'; Džudović (yellow card) 90+2'; Delibašić (yellow card) 90+3' | Report | Rooney 6'; Johnson (yellow card) 30'; Welbeck (yellow card) 42' | Stadium: Podgorica City Stadium; Attendance: 12,000; Referee: (Sweden) Jonas Eriksson |

=== International friendlies ===
| 6 February 2013 | England | 2–1 | Brazil | London |
| 19:30 | Rooney 27'; Lampard 60' | Report | Fred 48' | Stadium: Wembley Stadium; Attendance: 87,453; Referee: (Portugal) Pedro Proença |

| 29 May 2013 | England | 1–1 | Republic of Ireland | London |
| 20:00 | Lampard 23' | Report | Long 13' | Stadium: Wembley Stadium; Referee: (Scotland) William Collum |

| 2 June 2013 | Brazil | 2–2 | England | Rio de Janeiro |
| 20:00 | Fred 57'; Paulinho 82' | | Oxlade-Chamberlain 67'; Rooney 79' | Stadium: Maracanã Stadium |

== League tables ==
=== Premier League ===
In Sir Alex Ferguson's final season as manager, Manchester United comfortably won their 13th Premier League title and their 20th overall, topping the table in mid-November and never surrendering their lead, though a run of just three wins in their last eight matches meant that they squandered the chance to become the first ever top-flight side to earn a hundred points in a season. Neighbours and defending champions Manchester City finished in second place, though they never looked like seriously challenging for a second successive title, and this, combined with poor performances across other competitions, cost Roberto Mancini his job. Despite enduring a turbulent season in which Champions League-winning manager Roberto Di Matteo was dismissed early in the campaign and replaced by the extremely unpopular appointment of former Liverpool boss Rafael Benítez on an interim basis, Chelsea did improve on the previous season's finish by three places and 11 points, and also won the Europa League for the first time in their history. The final Champions League spot was taken by Arsenal; despite being well off the pace for much of the season following the £24 million departure of Robin van Persie in the summer, they managed to snatch fourth place with an excellent late run of form, consigning rivals Tottenham Hotspur to the Europa League once again.

David Moyes ended 11 years in charge of Everton by guiding the Toffees to a solid finish of sixth place, finishing two points ahead of arch rivals Liverpool, who hit the headlines again for all the wrong reasons when striker Luis Suárez received a lengthy ban after biting Chelsea defender Branislav Ivanović during a league game. Swansea City qualified for the Europa League by winning the League Cup, becoming the first Welsh club to qualify for a major European club competition, whilst West Bromwich Albion finished eighth, their best finish in the Premier League era.

West Ham United fared the best out of the three promoted teams, losing just four home games all season and finishing impressively in tenth place, despite repeated speculation that manager Sam Allardyce would be sacked and replaced with a manager with a reputation for a more attractive style of play. Southampton finished four places below them, flirting with relegation all season before Nigel Adkins was sacked and replaced by the relatively unknown Mauricio Pochettino, who guided the Saints to 19 points from their remaining 16 games.

At the bottom of the table, Queens Park Rangers were relegated after a thoroughly dismal campaign in which they recorded the worst start in Premier League history, not winning a league game until December, and with not even Harry Redknapp's appointment as manager and a substantial investment in players during the January transfer window significantly improving their fortunes. Reading, who never quite adjusted to the pace of the top-flight after being promoted as champions the previous year, fared little better and were relegated in second-bottom place. Both Reading and QPR were relegated on the same day after a 0-0 draw against each other. Despite winning the FA Cup (and thereby qualifying for the following season's Europa League), Wigan Athletic finally succumbed to relegation after eight years of battling against the odds in the Premier League.

==== League table ====
| Pos | Team | Pld | W | D | L | GF | GA | GD | Pts | Qualification or relegation |
|---|---|---|---|---|---|---|---|---|---|---|
| 1 | Manchester United (C) | 38 | 28 | 5 | 5 | 86 | 43 | +43 | 89 | Qualification for the Champions League group stage |
| 2 | Manchester City | 38 | 23 | 9 | 6 | 66 | 34 | +32 | 78 | Qualification for the Champions League group stage |
| 3 | Chelsea | 38 | 22 | 9 | 7 | 75 | 39 | +36 | 75 | Qualification for the Champions League group stage |
| 4 | Arsenal | 38 | 21 | 10 | 7 | 72 | 37 | +35 | 73 | Qualification for the Champions League play-off round |
| 5 | Tottenham Hotspur | 38 | 21 | 9 | 8 | 66 | 46 | +20 | 72 | Qualification for the Europa League play-off round |
| 6 | Everton | 38 | 16 | 15 | 7 | 55 | 40 | +15 | 63 | |
| 7 | Liverpool | 38 | 16 | 13 | 9 | 71 | 43 | +28 | 61 | |
| 8 | West Bromwich Albion | 38 | 14 | 7 | 17 | 53 | 57 | −4 | 49 | |
| 9 | Swansea City | 38 | 11 | 13 | 14 | 47 | 51 | −4 | 46 | Qualification for the Europa League third qualifying round (Note: Swansea City qualified for the Europa League third qualifying round as the 2012–13 Football League Cup winners.) |
| 10 | West Ham United | 38 | 12 | 10 | 16 | 45 | 53 | −8 | 46 | |
| 11 | Norwich City | 38 | 10 | 14 | 14 | 41 | 58 | −17 | 44 | |
| 12 | Fulham | 38 | 11 | 10 | 17 | 50 | 60 | −10 | 43 | |
| 13 | Stoke City | 38 | 9 | 15 | 14 | 34 | 45 | −11 | 42 | |
| 14 | Southampton | 38 | 9 | 14 | 15 | 49 | 60 | −11 | 41 | |
| 15 | Aston Villa | 38 | 10 | 11 | 17 | 47 | 69 | −22 | 41 | |
| 16 | Newcastle United | 38 | 11 | 8 | 19 | 45 | 68 | −23 | 41 | |
| 17 | Sunderland | 38 | 9 | 12 | 17 | 41 | 54 | −13 | 39 | |
| 18 | Wigan Athletic (R) | 38 | 9 | 9 | 20 | 47 | 73 | −26 | 36 | Qualification for the Europa League group stage and relegation to Football League Championship (Note: Wigan Athletic qualified for the Europa League group stage as the 2012–13 FA Cup winners.) |
| 19 | Reading (R) | 38 | 6 | 10 | 22 | 43 | 73 | −30 | 28 | Relegation to Football League Championship |
| 20 | Queens Park Rangers (R) | 38 | 4 | 13 | 21 | 30 | 60 | −30 | 25 | Relegation to Football League Championship |

Source: Barclays Premier League
Rules for classification: 1) Points; 2) Goal difference; 3) Goals scored; 4) Play-offs (only if needed to decide champion, teams for relegation or teams for UEFA competitions).
(C) Champions; (R) Relegated
Notes:

Leading goalscorer: Robin van Persie (Manchester United) – 26

=== Championship ===
After a decade of trying and play-off heartbreak, Cardiff City finally secured their long-awaited promotion to the Premier League, leading the division for nearly the entire season and being promoted as champions. Hull City finished the season as runners-up under manager Steve Bruce, returning to the top-flight after an absence of three years. This was despite a shaky end to the season which saw them fail to win any of their last four fixtures. Ian Holloway made it two promotions in three attempts as Crystal Palace were promoted through the play-offs, earning a record-breaking fourth promotion to the Premier League. The Eagles' success ensured that they became the first club to win the second-tier play-off final four times, and also the first club to win the play-off final at four separate venues – at home at Selhurst Park in a two-legged final format in 1989, the old Wembley in 1997, the Millennium Stadium in 2004 and the new Wembley in 2013.

Bolton Wanderers fared the best out of the newly relegated clubs and looked good value to secure a play-off place throughout the season, but narrowly missed out after drawing their final game and Leicester's last minute win at Nottingham Forest. Blackburn Rovers in contrast, despite a strong start to the season spent the latter part of it battling relegation, with indifferent spells of form during the season and the presence of three permanent managers seeing them slide towards the bottom 3 before finally pulling away under the caretaker management of Gary Bowyer.

Bristol City, who had been in a gradual downward spiral since failing to win promotion to the Premier League in 2008, were relegated in bottom place after a dismal end to the season. The arrival of Sean O'Driscoll and a run of 5 home victories from 6 failed to save them. Making even bigger headlines were Wolverhampton Wanderers, who suffered their second successive relegation, giving them the unwanted distinction of having suffered successive relegations from the top and second tiers on two separate occasions (the first being in the 1983–84 and 1984–85 seasons). The final relegation spot was filled by Peterborough United, who despite recovering well from seven consecutive losses at the start of the season, ended up being relegated with the joint-highest ever points total for a relegated team.

==== League table ====
A total of 24 teams contest the division: 18 sides remaining in the division from last season, three relegated from the Premier League, and three promoted from the League One.

| Pos | Team | Pld | W | D | L | GF | GA | GD | Pts | Promotion or relegation |
|---|---|---|---|---|---|---|---|---|---|---|
| 1 | Cardiff City (C, P) | 46 | 25 | 12 | 9 | 72 | 45 | +27 | 87 | Promotion to the Premier League |
| 2 | Hull City (P) | 46 | 24 | 7 | 15 | 61 | 52 | +9 | 79 | Promotion to the Premier League |
| 3 | Watford | 46 | 23 | 8 | 15 | 85 | 58 | +27 | 77 | Qualification for Championship play-offs |
| 4 | Brighton & Hove Albion | 46 | 19 | 18 | 9 | 69 | 43 | +26 | 75 | Qualification for Championship play-offs |
| 5 | Crystal Palace (O, P) | 46 | 19 | 15 | 12 | 73 | 62 | +11 | 72 | Qualification for Championship play-offs |
| 6 | Leicester City | 46 | 19 | 11 | 16 | 71 | 48 | +23 | 68 | Qualification for Championship play-offs |
| 7 | Bolton Wanderers | 46 | 18 | 14 | 14 | 69 | 61 | +8 | 68 | |
| 8 | Nottingham Forest | 46 | 17 | 16 | 13 | 63 | 59 | +4 | 67 | |
| 9 | Charlton Athletic | 46 | 17 | 14 | 15 | 65 | 59 | +6 | 65 | |
| 10 | Derby County | 46 | 16 | 13 | 17 | 65 | 62 | +3 | 61 | |
| 11 | Burnley | 46 | 16 | 13 | 17 | 62 | 60 | +2 | 61 | |
| 12 | Birmingham City | 46 | 15 | 16 | 15 | 63 | 69 | −6 | 61 | |
| 13 | Leeds United | 46 | 17 | 10 | 19 | 57 | 66 | −9 | 61 | |
| 14 | Ipswich Town | 46 | 16 | 12 | 18 | 48 | 61 | −13 | 60 | |
| 15 | Blackpool | 46 | 14 | 17 | 15 | 62 | 63 | −1 | 59 | |
| 16 | Middlesbrough | 46 | 18 | 5 | 23 | 61 | 70 | −9 | 59 | |
| 17 | Blackburn Rovers | 46 | 14 | 16 | 16 | 55 | 62 | −7 | 58 | |
| 18 | Sheffield Wednesday | 46 | 16 | 10 | 20 | 53 | 61 | −8 | 58 | |
| 19 | Huddersfield Town | 46 | 15 | 13 | 18 | 53 | 73 | −20 | 58 | |
| 20 | Millwall | 46 | 15 | 11 | 20 | 51 | 62 | −11 | 56 | |
| 21 | Barnsley | 46 | 14 | 13 | 19 | 56 | 70 | −14 | 55 | |
| 22 | Peterborough United (R) | 46 | 15 | 9 | 22 | 66 | 75 | −9 | 54 | Relegation to Football League One |
| 23 | Wolverhampton Wanderers (R) | 46 | 14 | 9 | 23 | 55 | 69 | −14 | 51 | Relegation to Football League One |
| 24 | Bristol City (R) | 46 | 11 | 8 | 27 | 59 | 84 | −25 | 41 | Relegation to Football League One |

Updated to match(es) played on 4 May 2013. Source: BBC Sport
Rules for classification: 1) points; 2) goal difference; 3) number of goals scored.
(C) Champions; (O) Play-off winners; (P) Promoted; (R) Relegated

Leading goalscorer: Glenn Murray (Crystal Palace) – 30

=== League One ===
Despite the departure of manager Dean Saunders, Doncaster Rovers made an immediate return to the Championship, winning the title in dramatic fashion on the final day of the season. Bournemouth were promoted as runners-up; they had initially looked set to battle relegation this season following an awful start under previous manager Paul Groves, but the decision to re-employ successful former manager Eddie Howe paid off handsomely, and saw them promoted to the second tier for only the second time in their history, and the first time since 1990. Yeovil Town won promotion through the play-offs, entering the Championship for the first time ever, and also meaning that manager Gary Johnson (who returned for his own second spell late in the previous season) had earned his third promotion with the club, having gotten them promoted from the Football Conference and League Two in 2003 and 2005 respectively. None of the three promoted clubs had ever played in the top flight at the time, be it the old Football League First Division or the current Premier League (before Bournemouth finally made it to the top flight 2 years later in 2015). The previous time this had happened was in 1979, when Shrewsbury Town, Watford and Swansea City were promoted (the latter two eventually competed in the top flight under both denominations).

Financially stricken Portsmouth finally hit rock-bottom, and were relegated to the Football League's lowest tier for the first time since 1980, just five years after winning the FA Cup, and three years after playing in the Premier League. They were consigned to bottom place after their second ten-point deduction in as many seasons, though unlike the previous season would have been relegated even without the deduction. Hartlepool United were relegated in second-bottom place, mostly due to a dreadful first half of the season which saw them win just once in their first 23 games, bringing an end to what had been the club's longest spell outside the bottom tier. Bury, who suffered their own financial problems and never quite recovered from the loss of manager Richie Barker days before the season began, also suffered relegation, and only finished above Hartlepool on goals scored. Scunthorpe United occupied the final relegation spot, being relegated for the second time in three seasons.

==== League table ====
A total of 24 teams contest the division: 17 sides remaining in the division from last season, three relegated from the Championship, and four promoted from League Two.

| Pos | Team | Pld | W | D | L | GF | GA | GD | Pts | Promotion, qualification or relegation |
|---|---|---|---|---|---|---|---|---|---|---|
| 1 | Doncaster Rovers (C, P) | 46 | 25 | 9 | 12 | 62 | 44 | +18 | 84 | Promotion to Football League Championship |
| 2 | Bournemouth (P) | 46 | 24 | 11 | 11 | 76 | 53 | +23 | 83 | Promotion to Football League Championship |
| 3 | Brentford | 46 | 21 | 16 | 9 | 62 | 47 | +15 | 79 | Qualification for League One play-offs (Note: Four teams play for one spot and promotion to Football League Championship.) |
| 4 | Yeovil Town (O, P) | 46 | 23 | 8 | 15 | 71 | 56 | +15 | 77 | Qualification for League One play-offs |
| 5 | Sheffield United | 46 | 19 | 18 | 9 | 56 | 42 | +14 | 75 | Qualification for League One play-offs |
| 6 | Swindon Town | 46 | 20 | 14 | 12 | 72 | 39 | +33 | 74 | Qualification for League One play-offs |
| 7 | Leyton Orient | 46 | 21 | 8 | 17 | 55 | 48 | +7 | 71 | |
| 8 | Milton Keynes Dons | 46 | 19 | 13 | 14 | 62 | 45 | +17 | 70 | |
| 9 | Walsall | 46 | 17 | 17 | 12 | 65 | 58 | +7 | 68 | |
| 10 | Crawley Town | 46 | 18 | 14 | 14 | 59 | 58 | +1 | 68 | |
| 11 | Tranmere Rovers | 46 | 19 | 10 | 17 | 58 | 48 | +10 | 67 | |
| 12 | Notts County | 46 | 16 | 17 | 13 | 61 | 49 | +12 | 65 | |
| 13 | Crewe Alexandra | 46 | 18 | 10 | 18 | 54 | 62 | −8 | 64 | |
| 14 | Preston North End | 46 | 14 | 17 | 15 | 54 | 49 | +5 | 59 | |
| 15 | Coventry City | 46 | 18 | 11 | 17 | 66 | 59 | +7 | 55 (Note: On 28 March Coventry City were deducted ten points for entering administration.) | |
| 16 | Shrewsbury Town | 46 | 13 | 16 | 17 | 54 | 60 | −6 | 55 | |
| 17 | Carlisle United | 46 | 14 | 13 | 19 | 56 | 77 | −21 | 55 | |
| 18 | Stevenage | 46 | 15 | 9 | 22 | 47 | 64 | −17 | 54 | |
| 19 | Oldham Athletic | 46 | 14 | 9 | 23 | 46 | 59 | −13 | 51 | |
| 20 | Colchester United | 46 | 14 | 9 | 23 | 47 | 68 | −21 | 51 | |
| 21 | Scunthorpe United (R) | 46 | 13 | 9 | 24 | 49 | 73 | −24 | 48 | Relegation to Football League Two |
| 22 | Bury (R) | 46 | 9 | 14 | 23 | 45 | 73 | −28 | 41 | Relegation to Football League Two |
| 23 | Hartlepool United (R) | 46 | 9 | 14 | 23 | 39 | 67 | −28 | 41 | Relegation to Football League Two |
| 24 | Portsmouth (R) | 46 | 10 | 12 | 24 | 51 | 69 | −18 | 32 (Note: On 20 April Portsmouth were deducted ten points after coming out of administration.) | Relegation to Football League Two |

Updated to match(es) played on 27 April 2013. Source: BBC Sport
Rules for classification: 1) Points; 2) Goal difference; 3) Number of goals scored
(C) Champions; (O) Play-off winners; (P) Promoted; (R) Relegated
Notes:

Leading goalscorer: Paddy Madden (Yeovil Town) – 23

=== League Two ===
Gillingham won the division and returned to League One after a three-year absence, as Martin Allen's appointment as manager brought immediate success. Rotherham United celebrated their return to their hometown (after four years of playing in Sheffield) by winning promotion as runners-up. Port Vale, whose promotion challenge had been derailed by a ten-point administration penalty in the previous season, took the final automatic promotion spot. The play-offs were won by Bradford City, who were victorious in their second Wembley appearance this season (their first being in the League Cup final).

Aldershot Town were relegated back to the Football Conference after five years, experiencing relegation for the first time since the club's formation in 1992. After surviving relegation on the last day for three seasons in a row, Barnet's luck finally ran out (despite their best points total in four years and the high-profile appointment of Edgar Davids as player-manager) and they were relegated from the Football League for the second time.

==== League table ====
Twenty-four teams contest the division: 18 sides remaining in the division from last season, four relegated from League One, and two promoted from Conference National.

| Pos | Team | Pld | W | D | L | GF | GA | GD | Pts | Promotion, qualification or relegation |
|---|---|---|---|---|---|---|---|---|---|---|
| 1 | Gillingham (C, P) | 46 | 23 | 14 | 9 | 66 | 39 | +27 | 83 | Promotion to Football League One |
| 2 | Rotherham United (P) | 46 | 24 | 7 | 15 | 74 | 59 | +15 | 79 | Promotion to Football League One |
| 3 | Port Vale (P) | 46 | 21 | 15 | 10 | 87 | 52 | +35 | 78 | Promotion to Football League One |
| 4 | Burton Albion | 46 | 22 | 10 | 14 | 71 | 65 | +6 | 76 | Qualification for League Two play-offs (Note: Four teams play for one spot and promotion to Football League One.) |
| 5 | Cheltenham Town | 46 | 20 | 15 | 11 | 58 | 51 | +7 | 75 | Qualification for League Two play-offs |
| 6 | Northampton Town | 46 | 21 | 10 | 15 | 64 | 55 | +9 | 73 | Qualification for League Two play-offs |
| 7 | Bradford City (O, P) | 46 | 18 | 15 | 13 | 63 | 52 | +11 | 69 | Qualification for League Two play-offs |
| 8 | Chesterfield | 46 | 18 | 13 | 15 | 60 | 45 | +15 | 67 | |
| 9 | Oxford United | 46 | 19 | 8 | 19 | 60 | 61 | −1 | 65 | |
| 10 | Exeter City | 46 | 18 | 10 | 18 | 63 | 62 | +1 | 64 | |
| 11 | Southend United | 46 | 16 | 13 | 17 | 61 | 55 | +6 | 61 | |
| 12 | Rochdale | 46 | 16 | 13 | 17 | 68 | 70 | −2 | 61 | |
| 13 | Fleetwood Town | 46 | 15 | 15 | 16 | 55 | 57 | −2 | 60 | |
| 14 | Bristol Rovers | 46 | 16 | 12 | 18 | 60 | 69 | −9 | 60 | |
| 15 | Wycombe Wanderers | 46 | 17 | 9 | 20 | 50 | 60 | −10 | 60 | |
| 16 | Morecambe | 46 | 15 | 13 | 18 | 55 | 61 | −6 | 58 | |
| 17 | York City | 46 | 12 | 19 | 15 | 50 | 60 | −10 | 55 | |
| 18 | Accrington Stanley | 46 | 14 | 12 | 20 | 51 | 68 | −17 | 54 | |
| 19 | Torquay United | 46 | 13 | 14 | 19 | 55 | 62 | −7 | 53 | |
| 20 | AFC Wimbledon | 46 | 14 | 11 | 21 | 54 | 76 | −22 | 53 | |
| 21 | Plymouth Argyle | 46 | 13 | 13 | 20 | 46 | 55 | −9 | 52 | |
| 22 | Dagenham & Redbridge | 46 | 13 | 12 | 21 | 55 | 62 | −7 | 51 | |
| 23 | Barnet (R) | 46 | 13 | 12 | 21 | 47 | 59 | −12 | 51 | Relegation to the Conference Premier |
| 24 | Aldershot Town (R) | 46 | 11 | 15 | 20 | 42 | 60 | −18 | 48 | Relegation to the Conference Premier |

Updated to match(es) played on 27 April 2013. Source: BBC Sport
Rules for classification: 1) Points; 2) Goal difference; 3) Number of goals scored
(C) Champions; (O) Play-off winners; (P) Promoted; (R) Relegated
Notes:

Leading goalscorer: Tom Pope (Port Vale) – 31

=== Football Conference (Top Division) ===
Promoted as champions of the Football Conference were Mansfield Town, who coincidentally were one of the teams replaced by Aldershot at the end of the 2007–08 season. They were joined by 2013 Conference Premier play-off final winners Newport County, who joined the Football League for the first time as the current incarnation of the club (their forerunners last played in the League in 1988). The play-off final between Newport County and Wrexham was the first Wembley Stadium final to feature two Welsh clubs.

AFC Telford United were relegated in bottom place after a terrible run of form which saw them win just one of their last 30 matches, along with getting through four different managers during the course of the season. Ebbsfleet United finished second-bottom amid financial worries caused by the collapse of their MyFootballClub ownership scheme. Barrow occupied third-bottom place, ultimately being cost dearly by their poor goalscoring record. Stockport County were the final relegated side, being relegated to the Conference North just three years after being in League One, and eleven years after being in the second tier.

==== League table ====
| Pos | Team | Pld | W | D | L | GF | GA | GD | Pts | Promotion, qualification or relegation |
|---|---|---|---|---|---|---|---|---|---|---|
| 1 | Mansfield Town (C, P) | 46 | 30 | 5 | 11 | 92 | 52 | +40 | 95 | Promotion to Football League Two |
| 2 | Kidderminster Harriers | 46 | 28 | 9 | 9 | 82 | 40 | +42 | 93 | Qualification for the Conference Premier play-offs |
| 3 | Newport County (O, P) | 46 | 25 | 10 | 11 | 85 | 60 | +25 | 85 | Qualification for the Conference Premier play-offs |
| 4 | Grimsby Town | 46 | 23 | 14 | 9 | 70 | 38 | +32 | 83 | Qualification for the Conference Premier play-offs |
| 5 | Wrexham | 46 | 22 | 14 | 10 | 74 | 45 | +29 | 80 | Qualification for the Conference Premier play-offs |
| 6 | Hereford United | 46 | 19 | 13 | 14 | 73 | 63 | +10 | 70 | |
| 7 | Luton Town | 46 | 18 | 13 | 15 | 70 | 62 | +8 | 67 | |
| 8 | Dartford | 46 | 19 | 9 | 18 | 67 | 63 | +4 | 66 | |
| 9 | Braintree Town | 46 | 19 | 9 | 18 | 63 | 72 | −9 | 66 | |
| 10 | Forest Green Rovers | 46 | 18 | 11 | 17 | 63 | 49 | +14 | 65 | |
| 11 | Macclesfield Town | 46 | 17 | 12 | 17 | 65 | 70 | −5 | 63 | |
| 12 | Woking | 46 | 18 | 8 | 20 | 73 | 81 | −8 | 62 | |
| 13 | Alfreton Town | 46 | 16 | 12 | 18 | 69 | 74 | −5 | 60 | |
| 14 | Cambridge United | 46 | 15 | 14 | 17 | 68 | 69 | −1 | 59 | |
| 15 | Nuneaton Town | 46 | 14 | 15 | 17 | 55 | 63 | −8 | 57 | |
| 16 | Lincoln City | 46 | 15 | 11 | 20 | 66 | 73 | −7 | 56 | |
| 17 | Gateshead | 46 | 13 | 16 | 17 | 58 | 61 | −3 | 55 | |
| 18 | Hyde | 46 | 16 | 7 | 23 | 63 | 75 | −12 | 55 | |
| 19 | Tamworth | 46 | 15 | 10 | 21 | 55 | 69 | −14 | 55 | |
| 20 | Southport | 46 | 14 | 12 | 20 | 72 | 86 | −14 | 54 | |
| 21 | Stockport County (R) | 46 | 13 | 11 | 22 | 57 | 76 | −19 | 50 | Relegation to Conference North |
| 22 | Barrow (R) | 46 | 11 | 13 | 22 | 45 | 83 | −38 | 46 | Relegation to Conference North |
| 23 | Ebbsfleet United (R) | 46 | 8 | 15 | 23 | 55 | 89 | −34 | 39 | Relegation to Conference South |
| 24 | AFC Telford United (R) | 46 | 6 | 17 | 23 | 52 | 79 | −27 | 35 | Relegation to Conference North |

Source: Football Conference
Rules for classification: 1) points; 2) goal difference; 3) number of goals scored.
(C) Champions; (O) Play-off winners; (P) Promoted; (R) Relegated

== Women's football ==
=== Women's Super League ===
| Pos | Team | Pld | W | D | L | GF | GA | GD | Pts | Qualification or relegation |
|---|---|---|---|---|---|---|---|---|---|---|
| 1 | Liverpool (C) | 14 | 12 | 0 | 2 | 46 | 19 | +27 | 36 | Qualification for the Champions League knockout phase |
| 2 | Bristol Academy | 14 | 10 | 1 | 3 | 30 | 20 | +10 | 31 | Qualification for the Champions League knockout phase |
| 3 | Arsenal (Note: Arsenal were deducted 3 points for fielding an unregistered player) | 14 | 10 | 3 | 1 | 31 | 11 | +20 | 30 | |
| 4 | Birmingham City | 14 | 5 | 3 | 6 | 16 | 21 | −5 | 18 | |
| 5 | Everton | 14 | 4 | 3 | 7 | 23 | 30 | −7 | 15 | |
| 6 | Lincoln | 14 | 2 | 4 | 8 | 10 | 15 | −5 | 10 | |
| 7 | Chelsea | 14 | 3 | 1 | 10 | 20 | 27 | −7 | 10 | |
| 8 | Doncaster Rovers Belles (Note: Doncaster Rovers Belles relegated to the Super League Second Division on financial grounds.) | 14 | 1 | 3 | 10 | 9 | 42 | −33 | 6 | Relegation to the FA WSL 2 |

Source: FA WSL
Rules for classification: 1) Points; 2) Goal difference; 3) Number of goals scored
(C) Champions

=== Women's Premier League ===
==== National Division ====
| Pos | Team | Pld | W | D | L | GF | GA | GD | Pts | Promotion or relegation |
|---|---|---|---|---|---|---|---|---|---|---|
| 1 | Sunderland (C, P) | 18 | 14 | 3 | 1 | 54 | 16 | +38 | 45 | Approved for FA WSL 2 |
| 2 | Watford (P) | 18 | 11 | 5 | 2 | 32 | 17 | +15 | 38 | Approved for FA WSL 2 |
| 3 | Leeds United (R) | 18 | 12 | 2 | 4 | 32 | 19 | +13 | 38 | Relegation to the Northern Division |
| 4 | Manchester City (P) | 18 | 7 | 4 | 7 | 32 | 25 | +7 | 25 | Approved for FA WSL 1 |
| 5 | Coventry City (R) | 18 | 8 | 1 | 9 | 25 | 27 | −2 | 25 | Relegation to the Southern Division |
| 6 | Aston Villa (P) | 18 | 7 | 3 | 8 | 21 | 29 | −8 | 24 | Approved for FA WSL 2 |
| 7 | Charlton Athletic (R) | 18 | 6 | 4 | 8 | 25 | 31 | −6 | 22 | Relegation to the Southern Division |
| 8 | Cardiff City (R) | 18 | 5 | 4 | 9 | 23 | 26 | −3 | 19 | Relegation to the Southern Division |
| 9 | Portsmouth (R) | 18 | 3 | 4 | 11 | 22 | 44 | −22 | 13 | Relegation to the Southern Division |
| 10 | Barnet (P) | 18 | 0 | 4 | 14 | 7 | 39 | −32 | 4 | Approved for FA WSL 2 |

Source: FA WPL
(C) Champions; (P) Promoted; (R) Relegated

==== Northern Division ====
| Pos | Team | Pld | W | D | L | GF | GA | GD | Pts | Promotion or relegation |
|---|---|---|---|---|---|---|---|---|---|---|
| 1 | Sheffield (C) | 16 | 13 | 2 | 1 | 46 | 16 | +30 | 41 | |
| 2 | Nottingham Forest | 16 | 10 | 2 | 4 | 35 | 22 | +13 | 32 | |
| 3 | Blackburn Rovers | 16 | 9 | 3 | 4 | 35 | 25 | +10 | 30 | |
| 4 | Sporting Club Albion | 16 | 8 | 3 | 5 | 40 | 24 | +16 | 27 | |
| 5 | Preston North End | 16 | 7 | 4 | 5 | 29 | 27 | +2 | 25 | |
| 6 | Newcastle United | 16 | 6 | 2 | 8 | 31 | 39 | −8 | 20 | |
| 7 | Wolverhampton Wanderers | 16 | 5 | 1 | 10 | 20 | 40 | −20 | 16 | |
| 8 | Derby County | 16 | 4 | 0 | 12 | 28 | 43 | −15 | 12 | |
| 9 | Leicester City (R) | 16 | 1 | 1 | 14 | 14 | 42 | −28 | 4 | Relegation to the Midland Combination League |

Source: FA WPL
(C) Champions; (R) Relegated

==== Southern Division ====
| Pos | Team | Pld | W | D | L | GF | GA | GD | Pts | Promotion or relegation |
|---|---|---|---|---|---|---|---|---|---|---|
| 1 | Reading (C, P) | 18 | 15 | 0 | 3 | 57 | 16 | +41 | 45 | Approved for FA WSL 2 |
| 2 | Millwall Lionesses (P) | 18 | 12 | 1 | 5 | 25 | 18 | +7 | 37 | Approved for FA WSL 2 |
| 3 | Yeovil Town (P) | 18 | 9 | 3 | 6 | 29 | 17 | +12 | 30 | Approved for FA WSL 2 |
| 4 | Brighton & Hove Albion | 18 | 8 | 4 | 6 | 32 | 30 | +2 | 28 | |
| 5 | Lewes | 18 | 7 | 2 | 9 | 23 | 24 | −1 | 23 | |
| 6 | West Ham United | 17 | 6 | 4 | 7 | 20 | 18 | +2 | 22 | |
| 7 | Gillingham | 18 | 5 | 4 | 9 | 19 | 29 | −10 | 19 | |
| 8 | Tottenham Hotspur | 17 | 4 | 4 | 9 | 22 | 33 | −11 | 16 | |
| 9 | Colchester United (R) | 16 | 3 | 7 | 6 | 17 | 30 | −13 | 16 | Club folded at the end of the season |
| 10 | Queens Park Rangers (R) | 18 | 2 | 5 | 11 | 14 | 43 | −29 | 11 | Relegation to the South East Combination League |

Source: FA WPL
(C) Champions; (P) Promoted; (R) Relegated

=== FA Women's Cup ===
==== Final ====
26 May 2013
15:00 BST

| Arsenal | 3–0 | Bristol Academy |
|---|---|---|
| Houghton 2'; Nobbs 72'; White 90+4' | Report |

Keepmoat Stadium, Doncaster
Attendance: 4,988
Referee: Jane Simms

=== FA WSL Cup ===
==== Final ====
4 October 2013
19:30 BST

| Arsenal | 2–0 | Lincoln |
|---|---|---|
| White 76'; Little 86' | Report |

The Hive, Canons Park
Attendance: 3,421
Referee: Lisa Rashid

== Managerial changes ==
| Name | Club | Date of departure | Replacement | Date of appointment |
|---|---|---|---|---|
| Sean Dyche | Watford | 3 July 2012 | Gianfranco Zola | 7 July 2012 |
| Steve Cotterill | Nottingham Forest | 12 July 2012 | Sean O'Driscoll | 19 July 2012 |
| Sean O'Driscoll | Crawley Town | 19 July 2012 | Richie Barker | 7 August 2012 |
| Richie Barker | Bury | 7 August 2012 | Kevin Blackwell | 26 September 2012 |
| Andy Thorn | Coventry City | 26 August 2012 | Mark Robins | 19 September 2012 |
| John Sheridan | Chesterfield | 28 August 2012 | Paul Cook | 25 October 2012 |
| Terry Brown | AFC Wimbledon | 19 September 2012 | Neal Ardley | 10 October 2012 |
| Gary Waddock | Wycombe Wanderers | 22 September 2012 | Gareth Ainsworth | 8 November 2012 |
| John Ward | Colchester United | 24 September 2012 | Joe Dunne | 27 September 2012 |
| Steve Kean | Blackburn Rovers | 28 September 2012 | Henning Berg | 31 October 2012 |
| Paul Groves | Bournemouth | 3 October 2012 | Eddie Howe | 12 October 2012 |
| Owen Coyle | Bolton Wanderers | 9 October 2012 | Dougie Freedman | 25 October 2012 |
| Eddie Howe | Burnley | 12 October 2012 | Sean Dyche | 30 October 2012 |
| Dougie Freedman | Crystal Palace | 23 October 2012 | Ian Holloway | 3 November 2012 |
| Paul Jewell | Ipswich Town | 24 October 2012 | Mick McCarthy | 1 November 2012 |
| Neale Cooper | Hartlepool United | 24 October 2012 | John Hughes | 13 November 2012 |
| Paul Cook | Accrington Stanley | 25 October 2012 | Leam Richardson | 1 November 2012 |
| Alan Knill | Scunthorpe United | 29 October 2012 | Brian Laws | 29 October 2012 |
| Ian Holloway | Blackpool | 3 November 2012 | Michael Appleton | 7 November 2012 |
| Michael Appleton | Portsmouth | 7 November 2012 | Guy Whittingham | 24 April 2013 |
| Roberto Di Matteo | Chelsea | 21 November 2012 | Rafael Benítez | 21 November 2012 |
| Mark Hughes | Queens Park Rangers | 23 November 2012 | Harry Redknapp | 24 November 2012 |
| Micky Mellon | Fleetwood Town | 1 December 2012 | Graham Alexander | 6 December 2012 |
| Mark McGhee | Bristol Rovers | 15 December 2012 | John Ward | 17 December 2012 |
| Sean O'Driscoll | Nottingham Forest | 26 December 2012 | Alex McLeish | 27 December 2012 |
| Henning Berg | Blackburn Rovers | 27 December 2012 | Michael Appleton | 11 January 2013 |
| Mark Robson | Barnet | 28 December 2012 | Edgar Davids | 28 December 2012 |
| Keith Hill | Barnsley | 29 December 2012 | David Flitcroft | 13 January 2013 |
| Carl Fletcher | Plymouth Argyle | 1 January 2013 | John Sheridan | 6 January 2013 |
| Ståle Solbakken | Wolverhampton Wanderers | 5 January 2013 | Dean Saunders | 7 January 2013 |
| Dean Saunders | Doncaster Rovers | 7 January 2013 | Brian Flynn | 17 January 2013 |
| Michael Appleton | Blackpool | 11 January 2013 | Paul Ince | 18 February 2013 |
| Derek McInnes | Bristol City | 12 January 2013 | Sean O'Driscoll | 14 January 2013 |
| Nigel Adkins | Southampton | 18 January 2013 | Mauricio Pochettino | 18 January 2013 |
| John Coleman | Rochdale | 21 January 2013 | Keith Hill | 22 January 2013 |
| Simon Grayson | Huddersfield Town | 24 January 2013 | Mark Robins | 14 February 2013 |
| Paul Dickov | Oldham Athletic | 3 February 2013 | Lee Johnson | 18 March 2013 |
| Keith Curle | Notts County | 3 February 2013 | Chris Kiwomya | 23 February 2013 |
| Alex McLeish | Nottingham Forest | 5 February 2013 | Billy Davies | 7 February 2013 |
| Graham Westley | Preston North End | 13 February 2013 | Simon Grayson | 18 February 2013 |
| Mark Robins | Coventry City | 14 February 2013 | Steven Pressley | 8 March 2013 |
| Paolo Di Canio | Swindon Town | 18 February 2013 | Kevin MacDonald | 28 February 2013 |
| Dean Holdsworth | Aldershot Town | 20 February 2013 | Andy Scott | 22 February 2013 |
| John Still | Dagenham & Redbridge | 26 February 2013 | Wayne Burnett | 2 May 2013 |
| Gary Mills | York City | 2 March 2013 | Nigel Worthington | 4 March 2013 |
| Brian McDermott | Reading | 11 March 2013 | Nigel Adkins | 26 March 2013 |
| Michael Appleton | Blackburn Rovers | 19 March 2013 | Gary Bowyer | 24 May 2013 |
| Gary Smith | Stevenage | 20 March 2013 | Graham Westley | 30 March 2013 |
| Paul Sturrock | Southend United | 25 March 2013 | Phil Brown | 25 March 2013 |
| Martin O'Neill | Sunderland | 30 March 2013 | Paolo Di Canio | 31 March 2013 |
| Neil Warnock | Leeds United | 1 April 2013 | Brian McDermott | 12 April 2013 |
| Danny Wilson | Sheffield United | 10 April 2013 | Chris Morgan | 10 April 2013 |
| Martin Ling | Torquay United | 29 April 2013 | Alan Knill | 7 May 2013 |
| Leam Richardson | Accrington Stanley | 30 April 2013 | James Beattie | 13 May 2013 |
| Brian Flynn | Doncaster Rovers | 3 May 2013 | Paul Dickov | 20 May 2013 |
| Dean Saunders | Wolverhampton Wanderers | 7 May 2013 | Kenny Jackett | 31 May 2013 |
| Kenny Jackett | Millwall | 7 May 2013 | Steve Lomas | 17 June |
| John Hughes | Hartlepool United | 9 May 2013 | Colin Cooper | 24 May 2013 |
| Roberto Mancini | Manchester City | 13 May 2013 | Manuel Pellegrini | 14 June 2013 |
| Tony Pulis | Stoke City | 21 May 2013 | Mark Hughes | 30 May 2013 |
| Rafael Benítez | Chelsea | 28 May 2013 | José Mourinho | 3 June 2013 |

== Deaths ==
- 7 July 2012: Jimmy Tansey, 83, former Everton and Crewe Alexandra defender.
- 11 July 2012: Joe McBride, 74, former Scotland and Luton Town striker.
- 11 July 2012: Bobby Nicol, 76, former Barnsley wing half.
- 12 July 2012: Eddy Brown, 86, former Preston North End, Southampton, Coventry City, Birmingham City, Leyton Orient and Scarborough forward.
- 22 July 2012: Eric Bell, 82, former Bolton Wanderers wing half who scored for Wanderers in the 1953 FA Cup Final against Blackpool despite being injured for most of the game.
- 23 July 2012: Ernie Machin, 68, former Coventry City, Plymouth Argyle and Brighton & Hove Albion midfielder.
- 27 July 2012: Jack Taylor, 82, Wolverhampton born referee who refereed the 1974 World Cup final between West Germany and the Netherlands.
- 30 July 2012: Les Green, 70, former Hartlepool United, Rochdale and Derby County goalkeeper.
- 16 August 2012: Phil Kelly, 73, former Republic of Ireland, Wolverhampton Wanderers and Norwich City full back.
- 20 August 2012: Len Quested, 87, former Fulham and Huddersfield Town full back or midfielder.
- 9 September 2012: Ron Tindall, 76, former Chelsea, West Ham United, Reading and Portsmouth striker.
- 12 September 2012: Jimmy Andrews, 85, former West Ham United, Leyton Orient and Queens Park Rangers winger, who also had four years as manager of Cardiff City.
- 14 September 2012: Frank Dudley, 87, former Southend United, Leeds United, Southampton, Cardiff City and Brentford forward.
- 26 September 2012: John Bond, 79, former West Ham United & Torquay United right-back, who was also known for his time as a manager with the likes of Bournemouth, Norwich City, Manchester City, Burnley, Swansea City, Birmingham City and Shrewsbury Town.
- 3 October 2012: Albie Roles, 91, former Southampton full back.
- 15 October 2012: Jim Rollo, 74, former Oldham Athletic, Southport and Bradford City goalkeeper.
- 17 October 2012: Milija Aleksic, 61, former Tottenham Hotspur goalkeeper who kept goal for the club in their FA Cup triumph of 1981. Also served Plymouth Argyle and Luton Town in the Football League.
- 18 October 2012: Iain Jamieson, 84, former Coventry City player and chairman.
- 24 October 2012: Peter Wright, 78, former Colchester United winger.
- 25 October 2012: John Connelly, 74, former England, Burnley, Manchester United, Blackburn Rovers and Bury outside forward.
- 4 November 2012: Reg Pickett, 85, former Portsmouth and Ipswich Town wing half.
- 5 November 2012: Jimmy Stephen, 90, former Scotland, Bradford Park Avenue and Portsmouth defender.
- 6 November 2012: Ivor Powell, 96, former Wales, Queens Park Rangers, Aston Villa, Port Vale and Bradford City wing half who also went into management with Port Vale, Bradford City and Carlisle United amongst others.
- 7 November 2012: Harry McShane, 92, former Blackburn Rovers, Huddersfield Town, Bolton Wanderers, Manchester United and Oldham Athletic outside left.
- 8 November 2012: Bobby Gilfillan, 74, former Newcastle United, Southend United and Doncaster Rovers forward.
- 14 November 2012: Eric Day, 91, former Southampton winger.
- 14 November 2012: Keith Ripley, 77, former Leeds United, Norwich City, Mansfield Town, Peterborough United and Doncaster Rovers forward.
- 18 November 2012: Kenny Morgans, 73, former Manchester United, Swansea City and Newport County outside right and survivor of the Munich air disaster in 1958.
- 20 November 2012: Gary Ingham, 48, former Doncaster Rovers goalkeeper.
- 25 November 2012: Dave Sexton, 82, former Luton Town, West Ham United, Leyton Orient, Brighton & Hove Albion and Crystal Palace inside forward who had spells in management with Leyton Orient, Chelsea, Queens Park Rangers, Manchester United, England U21 and Coventry City.
- 25 November 2012: Bert Linnecor, 78, former Birmingham City and Lincoln City wing half.
- 1 December 2012: Mitchell Cole, 27, former Southend United, Stevenage and Oxford United midfielder.
- 1 December 2012: Phil Taylor, 95, former England, Bristol Rovers and Liverpool wing half who also had a three-year spell in charge at Liverpool.
- 1 December 2012: Steve Fox, 54, former Birmingham City, Wrexham, Port Vale and Chester City winger.
- 13 December 2012: Ian Black, 88, former Scotland, Southampton and Fulham goalkeeper.
- 18 December 2012: George Showell, 78, former Wolverhampton Wanderers, Bristol City and Wrexham defender.
- 20 December 2012: Dennis Stevens, 79, former Bolton Wanderers, Everton, Oldham Athletic and Tranmere Rovers inside forward.
- 20 December 2012: Stan Charlton, 83, former Leyton Orient and Arsenal right back.
- 21 December 2012: George Hazlett, 89, former Bury, Cardiff City and Millwall outside right.
- 28 December 2012: Tommy Keane, 44, former Bournemouth and Colchester United midfielder.
- 4 January 2013: Derek Kevan, 77, former England, Bradford Park Avenue, West Bromwich Albion, Chelsea, Manchester City, Crystal Palace, Peterborough United, Luton Town and Stockport County centre forward.
- 9 January 2013: Harold Searson, 88, former Leeds United, Sheffield Wednesday, Mansfield Town and York City goalkeeper.
- 13 January 2013: Geoff Thomas, 64, former Swansea City midfielder
- 18 January 2013: Ian Wells, 48, former Hereford United forward.
- 23 January 2013: Jimmy Payne, 86, former Liverpool and Everton winger.
- 24 January 2013: Dave Harper, 74, former Millwall, Ipswich Town, Swindon Town and Orient midfielder.
- 29 January 2013: Reg Jenkins, 74, former Plymouth Argyle, Exeter City, Torquay United and Rochdale inside forward.
- 8 February 2013: Ron Hansell, 82, former Norwich City and Chester City inside forward.
- 10 February 2013: Bill Roost, 88, former Bristol Rovers and Swindon Town inside forward.
- 12 February 2013: Bill Bell, 81, former chairman of Port Vale (1987–2002).
- 21 February 2013: Dick Neal, Jr., 79, former Lincoln City, Birmingham City and Middlesbrough wing half.
- 24 February 2013: Con Martin, 89, former FAI, IFA, Leeds United and Aston Villa utility player.
- 28 February 2013: Seamus O'Connell, 83, former Middlesbrough, Chelsea and Carlisle United forward.
- 2 March 2013: Jimmy Jackson, 81, former Notts County striker.
- 4 March 2013: George Petherbridge, 85, former Bristol Rovers winger.
- 6 March 2013: Dave Bewley, 92, former Fulham, Reading and Watford full back.
- 6 March 2013: Dick Graham, 90, former Crystal Palace goalkeeper who also managed Palace, Leyton Orient, Walsall, Colchester United and Wimbledon.
- 7 March 2013: Stan Keery, 81, former Shrewsbury Town, Newcastle United, Mansfield Town and Crewe Alexandra wing half.
- 14 March 2013: Harry Thomson, 72, former Burnley, Blackpool and Barrow goalkeeper.
- 24 March 2013: Derek Leaver, 82, former Blackburn Rovers, A.F.C. Bournemouth and Crewe Alexandra midfielder.
- 2 April 2013: Barry Mealand, 70, former Fulham and Rotherham United right back.
- 6 April 2013: Bill Guttridge, 82, former Wolverhampton Wanderers and Walsall left back.
- 12 April 2013: Dennis John, 78, former Plymouth Argyle, Swansea Town, Scunthorpe United and Millwall defender.
- 17 April 2013: Paul Ware, 42, former Cardiff City, Macclesfield Town, Nuneaton Borough, Rochdale, Stockport County and Stoke City midfielder.
- 22 April 2013: Mike Smith, 77, former Derby County and Bradford City centre half.
- 23 April 2013: Tony Grealish, 56, former Republic of Ireland, Leyton Orient, Luton Town, Brighton & Hove Albion, West Bromwich Albion, Manchester City, Rotherham United and Walsall defender.
- April 2013: Ralph "Ginger" Johnson, 91, former Norwich City player and scorer of the fastest goal for the Canaries at Carrow Road.
- 29 April 2013: Kevin Moore, 55, former Grimsby Town, Oldham Athletic, Southampton and Fulham defender.
- 5 May 2013: Alan Arnell, 79, former Liverpool, Tranmere Rovers and Halifax Town striker.
- 6 May 2013: Steve Carney, 55, former Newcastle United, Darlington and Hartlepool United defender.
- 22 May 2013: Brian Greenhoff, 60, former England, Manchester United, Leeds United and Rochdale midfielder.
- 24 May 2013: Ron Davies, 70, former Wales, Luton, Norwich, Southampton, Portsmouth and Manchester United striker.

== Retirements ==
- 19 July 2012: Ledley King, 31, former England and Tottenham Hotspur defender.
- 25 July 2012: Chris Morgan, 34, former Barnsley and Sheffield United defender.
- 28 July 2012: Andriy Shevchenko, 35, former Ukraine and Chelsea striker.
- 30 July 2012: Ben Burgess, 30, former Blackburn Rovers, Stockport County, Hull City, Blackpool and Notts County striker.
- 15 August 2012: Fabrice Muamba, 24, former England U21, Arsenal, Birmingham City and Bolton Wanderers midfielder.
- 11 September 2012: Adam Miller, 30, former Queens Park Rangers and Gillingham midfielder.
- 25 September 2012: Sean Davis, 33, former Fulham, Tottenham Hotspur, Portsmouth, Bolton Wanderers, Bristol City and England under 21 midfielder.
- 1 October 2012: Jimmy Bullard, 33, former Peterborough United, Wigan Athletic, Fulham, Hull City, Ipswich Town and MK Dons midfielder.
- 2 October 2012: Michael Ballack, 36, former Germany and Chelsea midfielder.
- 7 October 2012: Lewis Haldane, 27, former Bristol Rovers, Port Vale and Wales under-21 winger.
- 6 November 2012: Wayne Hatswell, 37, former Oxford United, Kidderminster Harriers and Rushden & Diamonds defender.
- 24 November 2012: Henrik Pedersen, 37, former Denmark, Bolton Wanderers and Hull City striker/defender.
- 6 December 2012: Zdeněk Grygera, 32, former Czech Republic and Fulham defender.
- 8 December 2012: Kevin Kilbane, 35, former Republic of Ireland, Preston North End, West Bromwich Albion, Sunderland, Everton, Wigan Athletic, Hull City, Huddersfield Town and Coventry City midfielder.
- 1 January 2013: Leon McKenzie, 34, former Crystal Palace, Peterborough United, Norwich City, Coventry City, Charlton Athletic and Northampton Town forward.
- 7 February 2013: Jamie Carragher, 35, former England and Liverpool defender.
- 3 April 2013: Mark Allott, 36, former Oldham Athletic and Chesterfield midfielder
- 4 April 2013: Gareth Owen, 30, former Stoke City, Oldham Athletic, Stockport County, and Port Vale defender.
- 5 April 2013: David Hibbert, 27, former Port Vale, Preston North End, Shrewsbury Town and Peterborough United forward.
- 27 April 2013: Jack Lester, 37, former Grimsby Town, Nottingham Forest, Sheffield United and Chesterfield forward.
- 27 April 2013: Gareth Ainsworth, 39, former Preston North End, Cambridge United, Lincoln City, Port Vale, Wimbledon, Cardiff City, Queens Park Rangers and Wycombe Wanderers midfielder.
- 30 April 2013: John Thompson, 31, former Republic of Ireland, Nottingham Forest, Oldham Athletic and Notts County defender.
- 3 May 2013: Stephen Carr, 36, former Republic of Ireland, Tottenham Hotspur, Newcastle United and Birmingham City right back.
- 3 May 2013: Steve Fletcher, 40. former Hartlepool United and Chesterfield, striker most noted for his two spells at Bournemouth.
- 9 May 2013: Stiliyan Petrov, 33, former Bulgaria and Aston Villa midfielder.
- 17 May 2013: Jody Craddock, 37, former Cambridge United, Sunderland and Wolverhampton Wanderers defender.
- 26 May 2013: David Beckham, 38, former England captain and Manchester United midfielder.
- 19 May 2013: Michael Owen, 33, former England, Liverpool, Newcastle United, Manchester United and Stoke City forward.
- 19 May 2013: Paul Scholes, 38, former England and Manchester United midfielder.
- 23 May 2013: Clarke Carlisle, 33, PFA union chairman and former Blackpool, Queens Park Rangers, Leeds United, Watford, Burnley, York City and Northampton Town defender.
