= January 24 =

January 24 this year in various calendars
- Saturday, 24 January 2026
Akan	Nwonamemene
Armenian	8 Mehekani 1475
Aztec	Toxcatl 14, 2 Ehēcatl
Babylonian	4 Tebetu, 2336 SE
Balinese pawukon	Menga, Beteng, Laba, Umanis, Aryang, Saniscara of Medangkungan, Indra, Jangur, Sri
Bengali	10 Magh, BS 1432
Chinese	Yang Earth Dog・Stomach Mansion; Wood Snake Year, Month 12, Day 6 (Dahan, 11 days until Lichun)
Common Era	24 January 2026 CE
Coptic	16 Tobi, AM 1742
Egyptian	13 Payni, 2774 NE
Ethiopian	16 Ṭer, 2018 Amätä Məhrät
French Republican	Décade I, Quintidi de Pluviôse de l'Année 234 de la République
Gregorian	24 January, AD 2026
Hebrew	6 Shevat, AM 5786
Hindu	Uttarabhādrapada・Śiva; Solar: 11 Māgha, 1947 SE; Lunisolar: Ṣaṣṭhī, Śukla pakṣa of Māgha, 2082 VE; Siddhārthin・5126 KY・1,872,599
Icelandic	Laugardagur, 2 Þorri 2025
Islamic	5 Sha'aban, AH 1447 (using tabular method)
ISO week date	2026-W04-6
Japanese	6 Shiwasu, Reiwa 8 (Daikan, 11 days until Risshun)
Julian	11 January, AD 2026 (AM 7534)
Julian day	2461065
Korean	6 Sodal, 4358 DE
Maya	13.0.13.5.2; 0 Pax, 2 Ik
Roman	ante diem III Idus Ianuarias, MMDCCLXXIX AUC
Solar Hijri	4 Bahman, SH 1404
Tibetan	6 rgyal, shing mo sbrul 2152 or 1771 or 999

<<	January					>>
Su	Mo	Tu	We	Th	Fr	Sa
				1	2	3
4	5	6	7	8	9	10
11	12	13	14	15	16	17
18	19	20	21	22	23	24
25	26	27	28	29	30	31
2026

January 24 in recent years
2026 (Saturday)
2025 (Friday)
2024 (Wednesday)
2023 (Tuesday)
2022 (Monday)
2021 (Sunday)
2020 (Friday)
2019 (Thursday)
2018 (Wednesday)
2017 (Tuesday)

January 24 is the 24th day of the year in the Gregorian calendar; 341 days remain until the end of the year (342 in leap years).

== Events ==
=== Pre-1600 ===
- 41 – Claudius is proclaimed Roman emperor by the Praetorian Guard after they assassinate the previous emperor, his nephew Caligula.
- 914 – Start of the First Fatimid invasion of Egypt.
- 1438 – The Council of Basel suspends Pope Eugene IV.
- 1458 – Matthias Corvinus is elected King of Hungary.
- 1536 – King Henry VIII of England suffers an accident while jousting, leading to a brain injury that historians say may have influenced his later erratic behaviour and possible impotence.

=== 1601–1900 ===
- 1651 – Arauco War: Spanish and Mapuche authorities meet in the Parliament of Boroa renewing the fragile peace established at the parliaments of Quillín in 1641 and 1647.
- 1679 – King Charles II of England dissolves the Cavalier Parliament.
- 1742 – Charles VII Albert becomes Holy Roman Emperor.
- 1758 – During the Seven Years' War the leading burghers of Königsberg submit to Elizabeth of Russia, thus forming Russian Prussia (until 1763).
- 1817 – Crossing of the Andes: Many soldiers of Juan Gregorio de las Heras are captured during the action of Picheuta.
- 1835 – Slaves in Salvador da Bahia, Brazil, stage a revolt, which is instrumental in ending slavery there 50 years later.
- 1848 – California Gold Rush: James W. Marshall finds gold at Sutter's Mill near Sacramento.
- 1857 – The University of Calcutta is formally founded as the first fully fledged university in South Asia.
- 1859 – The United Principalities of Moldavia and Wallachia (later named Romania) is formed as a personal union under the rule of Domnitor Alexandru Ioan Cuza.
- 1900 – Second Boer War: Boers stop a British attempt to break the Siege of Ladysmith in the Battle of Spion Kop.

=== 1901–present ===
- 1908 – The first Boy Scout troop is organized in England by Robert Baden-Powell.
- 1915 – World War I: British Grand Fleet battle cruisers under Vice-Admiral Sir David Beatty engage Rear-Admiral Franz von Hipper's battle cruisers in the Battle of Dogger Bank.
- 1916 – In Brushaber v. Union Pacific Railroad Co., the Supreme Court of the United States declares the federal income tax constitutional.
- 1918 – The Gregorian calendar is introduced in Russia by decree of the Council of People's Commissars effective February 14 (New Style).
- 1933 – The 20th Amendment to the United States Constitution is ratified, changing the beginning and end of terms for all elected federal offices.
- 1935 – Gottfried Krueger Brewing Company starts selling the first canned beer.
- 1939 – The deadliest earthquake in Chilean history strikes Chillán, killing approximately 28,000 people.
- 1942 – World War II: The Allies bombard Bangkok, leading Thailand, then under Japanese control, to declare war against the United States and United Kingdom.
- 1943 – World War II: Franklin D. Roosevelt and Winston Churchill conclude a conference in Casablanca.
- 1946 – The United Nations General Assembly passes its first resolution to establish the United Nations Atomic Energy Commission.
- 1960 – Algerian War: Some units of European volunteers in Algiers stage an insurrection known as the "barricades week", during which they seize government buildings and clash with local police.
- 1961 – Goldsboro B-52 crash: A bomber carrying two H-bombs breaks up in mid-air over North Carolina. The uranium core of one weapon remains lost.
- 1966 – Air India Flight 101 crashes into Mont Blanc.
- 1968 – Vietnam War: The 1st Australian Task Force launches Operation Coburg against the North Vietnamese Army and Viet Cong during wider fighting around Long Bình and Biên Hòa.
- 1972 – Japanese Sgt. Shoichi Yokoi is found hiding in a Guam jungle, where he had been since the end of World War II.
- 1977 – The Atocha massacre occurs in Madrid during the Spanish transition to democracy.
- 1978 – Soviet satellite Kosmos 954, with a nuclear reactor on board, burns up in Earth's atmosphere, scattering radioactive debris over Canada's Northwest Territories. Only 1% is recovered.
- 1986 – The Voyager 2 space probe makes its closest approach to Uranus.
- 1987 – About 20,000 protestors march in a civil rights demonstration in Forsyth County, Georgia, United States.
- 1988 – An Aeroflot Yakovlev Yak-40 crashes at Nizhnevartovsk Airport, killing 27 people.
- 1990 – Japan launches Hiten, the country's first lunar probe, the first robotic lunar probe since the Soviet Union's Luna 24 in 1976, and the first lunar probe launched by a country other than Soviet Union or the United States.
- 2003 – The United States Department of Homeland Security officially begins operation.
- 2009 – Cyclone Klaus makes landfall near Bordeaux, France, causing 26 deaths as well as extensive disruptions to public transport and power supplies.
- 2011 – At least 35 are killed and 180 injured in a bombing at Moscow's Domodedovo Airport.
- 2018 – Former doctor Larry Nassar is sentenced up to 175 years in prison after being found guilty of using his position to sexually abuse female gymnasts.
- 2024 – An Ilyushin Il-76 crashes in Russia's Korochansky District, killing all 74 people on board.
- 2026 – At least 70 people are killed and 10 others missing after major landslides in West Java, Indonesia.

== Births ==
=== Pre-1600 ===
- 76 – Hadrian, Roman emperor (died 138)
- 1287 – Richard de Bury, English bishop and politician, Lord Chancellor of Great Britain (died 1345)
- 1444 – Galeazzo Maria Sforza, Duke of Milan (died 1476)
- 1547 – Joanna of Austria, Grand Duchess of Tuscany, Austrian Archduchess (died 1578)

=== 1601–1900 ===
- 1602 – Mildmay Fane, 2nd Earl of Westmorland, English politician (died 1666)
- 1619 – Yamazaki Ansai, Japanese philosopher (died 1682)
- 1643 – Charles Sackville, 6th Earl of Dorset, English poet and politician, Lord Chamberlain of Great Britain (died 1706)
- 1664 – John Vanbrugh, English architect and dramatist (died 1726)
- 1670 – William Congreve, English playwright and poet (died 1729)
- 1672 – Margrave Albert Frederick of Brandenburg-Schwedt, German Lieutenant General (died 1731)
- 1674 – Thomas Tanner, English bishop (died 1735)
- 1679 – Christian Wolff, German philosopher and academic (died 1754)
- 1684 – Charles Alexander, Duke of Württemberg, German noble (died 1737)
- 1705 – Farinelli, Italian castrato singer (died 1782)
- 1709 – Dom Bédos de Celles, French monk and organist (died 1779)
- 1712 – Frederick the Great, Prussian king (died 1786)
- 1732 – Pierre Beaumarchais, French playwright and financier (died 1799)
- 1739 – Jean Nicolas Houchard, French General of the French Revolution (died 1793)
- 1746 – Gustav III of Sweden (died 1792)
- 1749 – Charles James Fox, English businessman and politician, Secretary of State for Foreign and Commonwealth Affairs (died 1806)
- 1754 – Andrew Ellicott, American soldier and surveyor (died 1820)
- 1763 – Louis Alexandre Andrault de Langeron, French-Ukrainian general and politician (died 1831)
- 1776 – E. T. A. Hoffmann, German jurist, author, and composer (died 1822)
- 1843 – Josip Stadler, Croatian archbishop (died 1918)
- 1848 – Vasily Surikov, Russian painter (died 1916)
- 1858 – Constance Naden, English poet and philosopher (died 1889)
- 1862 – Edith Wharton, American novelist and short story writer (died 1937)
- 1864 – Marguerite Durand, French actress, journalist, and activist (died 1936)
- 1866 – Jaan Poska, Estonian lawyer and politician, 1st Estonian Minister of Foreign Affairs (died 1920)
- 1869 – Helena Maud Brown Cobb, American educator and missionary (died 1922)
- 1885 – Marjory Stephenson, British biochemist (died 1948)
- 1886 – Henry King, American actor, director, producer, and screenwriter (died 1982)
- 1887 – Jean-Henri Humbert, French botanist (died 1967)
- 1888 – Vicki Baum, Austrian author and screenwriter (died 1960)
- 1888 – Ernst Heinkel, German engineer and businessman, founded the Heinkel Aircraft Manufacturing Company (died 1958)
- 1889 – Victor Eftimiu, Romanian poet and playwright (died 1972)
- 1889 – Charles Hawes, American historian and author (died 1923)
- 1889 – Hermann-Bernhard Ramcke, German general of paratroop forces during World War II (died 1968)
- 1891 – Walter Model, German field marshal (died 1945)
- 1892 – Franz Aigner, Austrian weightlifter (died 1970)
- 1895 – Eugen Roth, German poet and songwriter (died 1976)
- 1897 – Paul Fejos, Hungarian-born American director (died 1963)
- 1899 – Hoyt Vandenberg, U.S. Air Force general (died 1954)
- 1900 – René Guillot, French writer (died 1969)

=== 1901–present ===
- 1901 – Harry Calder, South African cricketer (died 1995)
- 1901 – Cassandre, French painter (died 1968)
- 1901 – Edward Turner, English engineer (died 1973)
- 1905 – J. Howard Marshall, American lawyer and businessman (died 1995)
- 1906 – Wilfred Jackson, American animator and composer (died 1988)
- 1907 – Maurice Couve de Murville, French soldier and politician, Prime Minister of France (died 1999)
- 1907 – Jean Daetwyler, Swiss composer and musician (died 1994)
- 1907 – Ismail Nasiruddin of Terengganu, fourth Yang di-Pertuan Agong of Malaysia (died 1979)
- 1909 – Martin Lings, English author and scholar (died 2005)
- 1909 – Ester Šimerová-Martinčeková, Slovak painter (died 2005)
- 1910 – Doris Haddock, American political activist (died 2010)
- 1913 – Norman Dello Joio, American organist and composer (died 2008)
- 1913 – Ray Stehr, Australian rugby league player and coach (died 1983)
- 1915 – Vítězslava Kaprálová, Czech composer and conductor (died 1940)
- 1915 – Robert Motherwell, American painter and academic (died 1991)
- 1916 – Rafael Caldera, Venezuelan lawyer and politician, 65th President of Venezuela (died 2009)
- 1916 – Gene Mako, Hungarian-American tennis player and actor (died 2013)
- 1917 – Ernest Borgnine, American actor (died 2012)
- 1918 – Oral Roberts, American evangelist, founded Oral Roberts University and Oral Roberts Evangelistic Association (died 2009)
- 1918 – Gottfried von Einem, Austrian pianist and composer (died 1996)
- 1919 – Coleman Francis, American actor, director, producer, and screenwriter (died 1973)
- 1919 – Leon Kirchner, American composer and educator (died 2009)
- 1920 – Jimmy Forrest, American saxophonist (died 1980)
- 1920 – Jerry Maren, American actor (died 2018)
- 1922 – Daniel Boulanger, French actor and screenwriter (died 2014)
- 1924 – Brian Bevan, Australian rugby league player (died 1991)
- 1924 – Karpoori Thakur, Indian politician, 11th Chief Minister of Bihar (died 1988)
- 1925 – Gus Mortson, Canadian ice hockey player and coach (died 2015)
- 1925 – Maria Tallchief, American ballerina and actress (died 2013)
- 1926 – Ruth Asawa, American sculptor (died 2013)
- 1926 – Georges Lautner, French director and screenwriter (died 2013)
- 1927 – Paula Hawkins, American politician (died 2009)
- 1928 – Desmond Morris, English zoologist, ethologist, and painter (died 2026)
- 1928 – Michel Serrault, French actor (died 2007)
- 1930 – Terence Bayler, New Zealand actor (died 2016)
- 1930 – Mahmoud Farshchian, Iranian-Persian painter and academic (died 2025)
- 1930 – John Romita Sr., American comic book artist (died 2023)
- 1931 – Lars Hörmander, Swedish mathematician and academic (died 2012)
- 1934 – Stanisław Grochowiak, Polish poet and dramatist (died 1976)
- 1935 – Shivabalayogi, Indian religious leader (died 1994)
- 1936 – Doug Kershaw, American fiddle player and singer
- 1938 – Julius Hemphill, American saxophonist and composer (died 1995)
- 1939 – Renate Garisch-Culmberger, German shot putter (died 2023)
- 1939 – Ray Stevens, American singer-songwriter and actor
- 1940 – Joachim Gauck, German pastor and politician, 11th President of Germany
- 1941 – Neil Diamond, American singer-songwriter and guitarist
- 1941 – Aaron Neville, American singer
- 1941 – Dan Shechtman, Israeli chemist and academic, Nobel Prize laureate
- 1942 – Ingo Friedrich, German Member of the European Parliament
- 1942 – Gary Hart, American wrestler and manager (died 2008)
- 1943 – Barry Mealand, English footballer (died 2013)
- 1943 – Peter Struck, German lawyer and politician, 13th German Federal Minister of Defence (died 2012)
- 1943 – Sharon Tate, American model and actress (died 1969)
- 1943 – Tony Trimmer, English race car driver
- 1943 – Manuel Velázquez, Spanish footballer (died 2016)
- 1944 – David Gerrold, American science fiction screenwriter and author
- 1944 – Gian-Franco Kasper, Swiss ski official (died 2021)
- 1945 – John Garamendi, American football player and politician, 1st United States Deputy Secretary of the Interior
- 1945 – Subhash Ghai, Indian director, producer and screenwriter
- 1945 – Eva Janko, Austrian javelin thrower
- 1946 – Michael Ontkean, Canadian actor
- 1947 – Giorgio Chinaglia, Italian footballer (died 2012)
- 1947 – Michio Kaku, American physicist and academic
- 1947 – Warren Zevon, American singer-songwriter (died 2003)
- 1948 – Michael Des Barres, the 26th Marquis Des Barres, English musician, actor, and DJ
- 1949 – John Belushi, American actor and screenwriter (died 1982)
- 1949 – Rihoko Yoshida, Japanese voice actress
- 1950 – Daniel Auteuil, French actor, director, and screenwriter
- 1951 – Yakov Smirnoff, Ukrainian-American comedian and actor
- 1953 – Yuri Bashmet, Russian violinist, viola player, and conductor
- 1953 – Moon Jae-in, South Korean politician, 19th President of South Korea
- 1954 – Jo Gartner, Austrian racing driver (died 1986)
- 1955 – Jim Montgomery, American swimmer
- 1955 – Alan Sokal, American physicist and author
- 1955 – Lynda Weinman, American businesswoman and author
- 1956 – Agus Martowardojo, governor of Bank Indonesia
- 1957 – Mark Eaton, American basketball player and sportscaster (died 2021)
- 1957 – Adrian Edmondson, English comedian and actor
- 1958 – Kim Eui-kon, Korean wrestler (died 2014)
- 1958 – Jools Holland, English singer-songwriter and pianist
- 1958 – Frank Ullrich, German biathlete
- 1959 – Akira Maeda, Japanese wrestler, mixed martial artist, and actor
- 1959 – Michel Preud'homme, Belgian footballer and manager
- 1960 – Jack Neo, Singaporean filmmaker, director and actor
- 1961 – Jorge Barrios, Uruguayan footballer
- 1961 – Guido Buchwald, German footballer and manager
- 1961 – Christa Kinshofer, German ski racer
- 1961 – Nastassja Kinski, German-American actress and producer
- 1961 – William Van Dijck, Belgian runner
- 1963 – Arnold Vanderlyde, Dutch boxer
- 1965 – Mike Awesome, American wrestler (died 2007)
- 1965 – Carlos Saldanha, Brazilian-American actor, director, producer, and screenwriter
- 1965 – Pagonis Vakalopoulos, Greek footballer and manager
- 1966 – Julie Dreyfus, French actress
- 1966 – Karin Viard, French actress
- 1967 – Michael Kiske, German singer
- 1967 – Phil LaMarr, American actor and comedian
- 1968 – Fernando Escartín, Spanish cyclist
- 1968 – Tymerlan Huseynov, Ukrainian footballer
- 1968 – Antony Garrett Lisi, American theoretical physicist
- 1968 – Mary Lou Retton, American gymnast
- 1969 – Yoo Ho-jeong, South Korean actress
- 1969 – Carlos Rômulo Gonçalves e Silva, Brazilian religious leader, Bishop of Montenegro
- 1970 – Roberto Bonano, Argentine footballer
- 1970 – Luke Egan, Australian surfer
- 1970 – Neil Johnson, Zimbabwean cricketer
- 1970 – Matthew Lillard, American actor
- 1971 – José Carlos Fernandez, Bolivian footballer
- 1972 – Beth Hart, American singer-songwriter and musician
- 1974 – Cyril Despres, French rally racer
- 1974 – Ed Helms, American actor, producer, and screenwriter
- 1974 – Melissa Tkautz, Australian actress and singer
- 1974 – Rokia Traoré, Malian singer
- 1975 – Gianluca Basile, Italian former professional basketball player
- 1975 – Rónald Gómez, Costa Rican footballer and manager
- 1975 – Henna Raita, Finnish alpine skier
- 1976 – Shae-Lynn Bourne, Canadian ice dancer, coach, and choreographer
- 1976 – Cindy Pieters, Belgian cyclist
- 1977 – Andrija Gerić, Serbian volleyball player
- 1977 – Michelle Hunziker, Swiss-Dutch actress, model and singer
- 1978 – Veerle Baetens, Belgian actress and singer
- 1978 – Mark Hildreth, Canadian actor and musician
- 1978 – Kristen Schaal, American actress, voice artist, comedian and writer
- 1979 – Tatyana Ali, American actress and singer
- 1979 – Leandro Desábato, Argentinian footballer
- 1979 – Busy Signal, Jamaican dancehall reggae artist
- 1979 – Nik Wallenda, American acrobat
- 1980 – Jofre Mateu, Spanish footballer
- 1980 – Suzy, Portuguese singer
- 1981 – Carrie Coon, American actress
- 1981 – Zaur Hashimov, Azerbaijani footballer and manager
- 1981 – Elena Kolomina, Kazakhstani cross country skier
- 1983 – Davide Biondini, Italian footballer
- 1983 – Shaun Maloney, Scottish footballer
- 1983 – Scott Speed, American race car driver
- 1984 – Justin Baldoni, American actor, director, and producer
- 1984 – Paulo Sérgio, Portuguese footballer
- 1986 – Cristiano Araújo, Brazilian singer-songwriter (died 2015)
- 1986 – Mischa Barton, English-American actress
- 1986 – Tyler Flowers, American baseball player
- 1986 – Vladislav Ivanov, Russian footballer
- 1986 – Sean McVay, American football coach
- 1987 – Brian Cushing, American football player
- 1987 – Luis Suárez, Uruguayan footballer
- 1987 – Kia Vaughn, American-Czech basketball player
- 1987 – Guan Xin, Chinese basketball player
- 1988 – Selina Jörg, German snowboarder
- 1988 – DaJuan Summers, American basketball player
- 1989 – Gong Lijiao, Chinese shot putter
- 1989 – Whit Merrifield, American baseball player
- 1989 – José Quintana, Colombian baseball player
- 1989 – Ki Sung-yueng, South Korean footballer
- 1990 – Mao Abe, Japanese singer-songwriter and guitarist
- 1991 – Zhan Beleniuk, Ukrainian Greco-Roman wrestler
- 1991 – Tatiana Kashirina, Russian weightlifter
- 1991 – Zack Kassian, Canadian ice hockey player
- 1999 – Vitalie Damașcan, Moldovan footballer
- 1999 – Niki, Indonesian singer and songwriter
- 1999 – Tristan Wirfs, American football player
- 2003 – Johnny Orlando, Canadian singer and songwriter
- 2012 – Princess Athena of Denmark

== Deaths ==
=== Pre-1600 ===
- 41 – Caligula, Roman emperor (born 12)
- 817 – Pope Stephen IV (born 770)
- 901 – Liu Jishu, general of the Tang Dynasty
- 1046 – Eckard II, Margrave of Meissen (born c. 985)
- 1125 – David IV (born 1073)
- 1336 – Alfonso IV of Aragon (born 1299)
- 1376 – Richard FitzAlan, 10th Earl of Arundel, English commander (born 1306)
- 1473 – Conrad Paumann, German organist and composer (born 1410)
- 1525 – Franciabigio, Florentine painter (born 1482)
- 1595 – Ferdinand II, Archduke of Austria (born 1529)

=== 1601–1900 ===
- 1626 – Samuel Argall, English captain and politician, Colonial Governor of Virginia (born 1572)
- 1639 – Jörg Jenatsch, Swiss pastor and politician (born 1596)
- 1666 – Johann Andreas Herbst, German composer and theorist (born 1588)
- 1709 – George Rooke, English admiral and politician (born 1650)
- 1877 – Johann Christian Poggendorff, German physicist and journalist (born 1796)
- 1881 – James Collinson, English painter (born 1825)
- 1883 – Friedrich von Flotow, German composer (born 1812)
- 1895 – Lord Randolph Churchill, English lawyer and politician, Chancellor of the Exchequer (born 1849)

=== 1901–present ===
- 1920 – Percy French, Irish songwriter, entertainer and artist (born 1854)
- 1920 – Amedeo Modigliani, Italian painter and sculptor (born 1884)
- 1939 – Maximilian Bircher-Benner, Swiss physician, created Muesli (born 1867)
- 1946 – Morris Alexander, South African politician (born 1877)
- 1960 – Edwin Fischer, Swiss pianist and conductor (born 1886)
- 1961 – Alfred Carlton Gilbert, American pole vaulter and businessman, founded the A. C. Gilbert Company (born 1884)
- 1962 – André Lhote, French sculptor and painter (born 1885)
- 1962 – Ahmet Hamdi Tanpınar, Turkish author, poet, and scholar (born 1901)
- 1965 – Winston Churchill, English statesman, soldier, and writer, Prime Minister of the United Kingdom, Nobel Prize laureate (born 1874)
- 1966 – Homi J. Bhabha, Indian physicist and academic (born 1909)
- 1970 – Caresse Crosby, American fashion designer and publisher, co-founded the Black Sun Press (born 1891)
- 1971 – Bill W., American activist, co-founder of Alcoholics Anonymous (born 1895)
- 1973 – J. Carrol Naish, American actor (born 1896)
- 1975 – Larry Fine, American comedian (born 1902)
- 1982 – Alfredo Ovando Candía, Bolivian general and politician, 56th President of Bolivia (born 1918)
- 1983 – George Cukor, American director and producer (born 1899)
- 1986 – L. Ron Hubbard, American religious leader and author, founded the Church of Scientology (born 1911)
- 1986 – Gordon MacRae, American actor and singer (born 1921)
- 1988 – Werner Fenchel, German-Danish mathematician and academic (born 1905)
- 1989 – Ted Bundy, American serial killer (born 1946)
- 1990 – Madge Bellamy, American actress (born 1899)
- 1992 – Ken Darby, American composer and conductor (born 1909)
- 1993 – Gustav Ernesaks, Estonian composer and conductor (born 1908)
- 1993 – Thurgood Marshall, American lawyer and jurist, 32nd United States Solicitor General (born 1908)
- 1993 – Uğur Mumcu, Turkish investigative journalist (born 1942)
- 2001 – Gaffar Okkan, Turkish police chief (born 1952)
- 2002 – Elie Hobeika, Lebanese commander and politician (born 1956)
- 2003 – Gianni Agnelli, Italian businessman (born 1921)
- 2004 – Leônidas, Brazilian footballer and manager (born 1913)
- 2006 – Schafik Handal, Salvadoran politician (born 1930)
- 2007 – Krystyna Feldman, Polish actress (born 1916)
- 2007 – İsmail Cem İpekçi, Turkish journalist and politician, 45th Turkish Minister of Foreign Affairs (born 1940)
- 2007 – Guadalupe Larriva, Ecuadorian academic and politician (born 1956)
- 2007 – Emiliano Mercado del Toro, Puerto Rican-American soldier (born 1891)
- 2008 – Usha Narayanan, Burmese-born First Lady of India (born 1922)
- 2010 – Pernell Roberts, American actor (born 1928)
- 2011 – Bernd Eichinger, German director and producer (born 1949)
- 2014 – Shulamit Aloni, Israeli lawyer and politician, 11th Israeli Minister of Education (born 1928)
- 2014 – Rafael Pineda Ponce, Honduran academic and politician (born 1930)
- 2015 – Otto Carius, German lieutenant and pharmacist (born 1922)
- 2016 – Fredrik Barth, German-Norwegian anthropologist and academic (born 1928)
- 2016 – Marvin Minsky, American computer scientist and academic (born 1927)
- 2016 – Henry Worsley, English colonel and explorer (born 1960)
- 2017 – Helena Kmieć, Polish Roman Catholic missionary (born 1991)
- 2017 – Butch Trucks, American drummer (born 1947)
- 2018 – Mark E. Smith, British singer-songwriter (born 1957)
- 2019 – Rosemary Bryant Mariner, American United States Naval Aviator (born 1953)
- 2025 – Iris Cummings, American swimmer and aviator (born 1920)

== Holidays and observances ==
- Christian feast day:
  - Babylas of Antioch
  - Exuperantius of Cingoli
  - Felician of Foligno
  - Francis de Sales
  - Blessed Marie Poussepin
  - Pratulin Martyrs (Greek Catholic Church)
  - January 24 (Eastern Orthodox liturgics)
- Day of the Unification of the Romanian Principalities (Romania)
- Feast of Our Lady of Peace (Roman Catholic Church), and its related observances:
  - Feria de Alasitas (La Paz)
- Uttar Pradesh Day (Uttar Pradesh, India)
- National Girl Child Day (India)
