= Action of Picheuta =

Part of the Spanish American Wars of Independence (1817)

In the Spanish American Wars of Independence, the action of Picheuta was a military engagement that took place on January 24, 1817, during the Crossing of the Andes.

The column led by Juan Gregorio de las Heras was still crossing the mountain range, being 50 kilometers away from the Uspallata Pass. A royalist task force led by Miguel Marquelli, composed of three officials and fifty soldiers, surprised the patriots at Picheuta, which was defended by five soldiers, many privates and a corporal from the battalion Nº 11. Marquelli had orders to cross the Uspallata on a reconnaissance mission.

The royalists surprised the patriots with an attack from the left flank. Half the forces of Las Heras was captured and taken prisoners, and the others fled to warn the bulk of the Army of the Andes of the nearby royalist presence. This led to the Battle of Potrerillos the following day.

== Bibliography ==
- Camogli, Pablo; Luciano de Privitellio (2005). Batallas por la Libertad. Buenos Aires: Aguilar. ISBN 987-04-0105-8.
