= Ralph Johnson (footballer) =

English footballer

Personal information
- Full name: Victor Ralph Johnson
- Date of birth: 15 April 1922
- Place of birth: Hethersett
- Date of death: 23 April 2013 (aged 91)
- Position: Forward

Senior career*
Years	Team	Apps	(Gls)
1946–1947	Norwich City	18	(8)
1947–1948	Leyton Orient	7	(2)
Total		25	(10)
- * Club domestic league appearances and goals

Victor Ralph "Ginger" Johnson (15 April 1922 – 23 April 2013) was an English footballer. He lived in Hethersett for the majority of his life, and held a record for the fastest goal in Carrow Road stadium for Norwich City. His career was mostly overshadowed by World War 2.
