= Dave Bewley =

English footballer

Personal information
- Date of birth: 22 September 1920
- Place of birth: Bournemouth, England
- Date of death: 6 March 2013 (aged 92)
- Position: Full back

Senior career*
Years	Team	Apps	(Gls)
	Gravesend & Northfleet	?	(?)
1946–1949	Fulham	17	(1)
1949–1951	Reading	11	(1)
1951–1953	Fulham	0	(0)
1953–1956	Watford	113	(1)
Total		141	(3)
- * Club domestic league appearances and goals

David G. Bewley (22 September 1920 – 6 March 2013) was an English professional footballer who played as a full back for several teams in the Football League. He was born in Bournemouth, England. He died on 6 March 2013. At his death, he was Reading's oldest former player.
