= Barry Mealand =

English footballer

Personal information
- Full name: Kenneth Barry Mealand
- Date of birth: 24 January 1943
- Place of birth: Carshalton, England
- Date of death: 2 April 2013 (aged 70)
- Place of death: Royal Tunbridge Wells, England
- Position: Right back

Youth career
- 1959–1961: Fulham

Senior career*
Years	Team	Apps	(Gls)
1961–1968	Fulham	29	(0)
1968–1970	Rotherham United	45	(0)
- Goole Town
Total		74	(0)
- * Club domestic league appearances and goals

Kenneth Barry Mealand (24 January 1943 – 2 April 2013) was an English professional footballer who played as a right back.

== Career ==
Born in Carshalton, Mealand played for Fulham, Rotherham United and Goole Town.

== Later life and death ==
Mealand died on 2 April 2013.
