= Abda =

Abda may refer to:

== Given name ==
- Abda (biblical figure), two biblical figures
- Abda of Edessa (dates unknown), Bishop of Edessa and saint of the Syriac Orthodox Church
- Abda of Dair-Koni (c. 450–?), also known as Rabban Mar Abda, abbot and saint of the Church of the East
- Abda of Hira (died 680), monk and saint of the Assyrian Church of the East
- Abdas of Susa (died 420), Persian bishop, also spelled Abda
- Abda, one of the two Christian martyrs, Abda and Sabas
- Abda, one of two Christian martyr bishops, Abda and Abdjesus
- Abda, or Abd-al-Masih (martyr), Christian saint and martyr
- Urraca Sanchez, daughter of King Sancho II of Pamplona who adopted the Arabic name Abda after being given to Almanzor

== Other uses ==
- Abda, Bangladesh, a village
- Abda, Hungary, a village
- Abda (Morocco), an Arabophone tribal confederacy of Morocco
- American-British-Dutch-Australian Command (ABDA Command), a short-lived World War II supreme command of Allied forces in Southeast Asia

== See also ==
- Abro (disambiguation)
- Ben Abda, a surname
