= February 16 =

February 16 this year in various calendars
- Monday, 16 February 2026
Akan	Fodwo
Armenian	1 Areg 1475
Aztec	Etzalcualiztli 17, 12 Cōātl
Babylonian	27 Tebetu, 2336 SE
Balinese pawukon	Menga, Pasah, Sri, Wage, Tungleh, Coma of Parangbakat, Sri, Urungan, Dewa
Bengali	3 Falgun, BS 1432
Chinese	Yin Metal Rooster・Roof Mansion; Wood Snake Year, Month 12, Day 29 (Lichun, 2 days until Yushui)
Common Era	16 February 2026 CE
Coptic	9 Meshir, AM 1742
Egyptian	6 Epiphi, 2774 NE
Ethiopian	9 Yakātit, 2018 Amätä Məhrät
French Republican	Décade III, Octidi de Pluviôse de l'Année 234 de la République
Gregorian	16 February, AD 2026
Hebrew	29 Shevat, AM 5786
Hindu	Śravaṇa・Vyatīpāta; Solar: 4 Phālguna, 1947 SE; Lunisolar: Caturdaśī, Kṛishna pakṣa of Māgha, 2082 VE; Siddhārthin・5126 KY・1,872,622
Icelandic	Mánudagur, 25 Þorri 2025
Islamic	28 Sha'aban, AH 1447 (using tabular method)
ISO week date	2026-W08-1
Japanese	29 Shiwasu, Reiwa 8 (Risshun, 3 days until Usui)
Julian	3 February, AD 2026 (AM 7534)
Julian day	2461088
Korean	29 Sodal, 4358 DE
Maya	13.0.13.6.5; 3 Kayab, 12 Chicchan
Roman	ante diem III Nonas Februarias, MMDCCLXXIX AUC
Solar Hijri	27 Bahman, SH 1404
Tibetan	29 rgyal, shing mo sbrul 2152 or 1771 or 999

<<	February					>>
Su	Mo	Tu	We	Th	Fr	Sa
1	2	3	4	5	6	7
8	9	10	11	12	13	14
15	16	17	18	19	20	21
22	23	24	25	26	27	28
2026

February 16 in recent years
2026 (Monday)
2025 (Sunday)
2024 (Friday)
2023 (Thursday)
2022 (Wednesday)
2021 (Tuesday)
2020 (Sunday)
2019 (Saturday)
2018 (Friday)
2017 (Thursday)

February 16 is the 47th day of the year in the Gregorian calendar; 318 days remain until the end of the year (319 in leap years).

== Events ==
=== Pre-1600 ===
- 1249 – Andrew of Longjumeau is dispatched by Louis IX of France as his ambassador to meet with the Khagan of the Mongol Empire.
- 1270 – The Grand Duchy of Lithuania defeats the Livonian Order in the Battle of Karuse.

=== 1601–1900 ===
- 1630 – Dutch forces led by Hendrick Lonck capture Olinda in what was to become part of Dutch Brazil.
- 1646 – Battle of Torrington, Devon: The last major battle of the First English Civil War.
- 1699 – First Leopoldine Diploma is issued by the Holy Roman Emperor, recognizing the Greek Catholic clergy enjoyed the same privileges as Roman Catholic priests in the Principality of Transylvania.
- 1742 – Spencer Compton, Earl of Wilmington, becomes British Prime Minister.
- 1796 – Colombo in Ceylon (now Sri Lanka) falls to the British, completing their invasion of Ceylon.
- 1804 – First Barbary War: Stephen Decatur leads a raid to burn the pirate-held frigate USS Philadelphia.
- 1862 – American Civil War: General Ulysses S. Grant captures Fort Donelson, Tennessee.
- 1866 – Spencer Compton Cavendish, Marquess of Hartington becomes British Secretary of State for War.
- 1881 – The Canadian Pacific Railway is incorporated by Act of Parliament at Ottawa (44th Vic., c.1).
- 1899 – Iceland's first football club, Knattspyrnufélag Reykjavíkur, is founded.
- 1900 – The Southern Cross expedition led by Carsten Borchgrevink achieves a new Farthest South of 78° 50'S, making the first landing at the Great Ice Barrier.

=== 1901–present ===
- 1918 – The Council of Lithuania unanimously adopts the Act of Independence, declaring Lithuania an independent state.
- 1923 – Howard Carter unseals the burial chamber of Pharaoh Tutankhamun.
- 1930 – The Romanian Football Federation joins FIFA.
- 1934 – The Austrian Civil War ends with the defeat of the Social Democrats and the Republikanischer Schutzbund.
- 1934 – The Commission of Government is officially sworn in; ending 79 years of responsible government in Newfoundland.
- 1936 – The Popular Front wins the 1936 Spanish general election.
- 1937 – Wallace H. Carothers receives a United States patent for nylon.
- 1940 – World War II: Altmark incident: The German tanker Altmark is boarded by sailors from the British destroyer HMS Cossack. A total of 299 British prisoners are freed.
- 1942 – World War II: In Athens, the Greek People's Liberation Army is established
- 1942 – World War II: Attack on Aruba, first World War II German shots fired on a land based object in the Americas.
- 1943 – World War II: In the early phases of the Third Battle of Kharkov, Red Army troops re-enter the city.
- 1945 – World War II: American forces land on Corregidor Island in the Philippines.
- 1945 – The Alaska Equal Rights Act of 1945, the first anti-discrimination law in the United States, was signed into law.
- 1959 – Fidel Castro becomes Premier of Cuba after dictator Fulgencio Batista was overthrown on January 1.
- 1960 – The U.S. Navy submarine USS Triton begins Operation Sandblast, setting sail from New London, Connecticut, to begin the first submerged circumnavigation of the globe.
- 1961 – Explorer program: Explorer 9 (S-56a) is launched.
- 1962 – The Great Sheffield Gale impacts the United Kingdom, killing nine people; the city of Sheffield is devastated, with 150,000 homes damaged.
- 1962 – Flooding in the coastal areas of West Germany kills 315 and destroys the homes of about 60,000 people.
- 1968 – In Haleyville, Alabama, the first 9-1-1 emergency telephone system goes into service.
- 1968 – Civil Air Transport Flight 010 crashes near Shongshan Airport in Taiwan, killing 21 of the 63 people on board and one more on the ground.
- 1978 – The first computer bulletin board system is created (CBBS in Chicago).
- 1983 – The Ash Wednesday bushfires in Victoria and South Australia kill 75.
- 1984 – Iran launches Operation Dawn 5, a major offensive during the Iran–Iraq War targeting the Basra–Baghdad highway, resulting in heavy casualties on both sides.
- 1985 – Hezbollah is founded.
- 1986 – The Soviet liner MS Mikhail Lermontov runs aground in the Marlborough Sounds, New Zealand.
- 1986 – China Airlines Flight 2265 crashes into the Pacific Ocean near Penghu Airport in Taiwan, killing all 13 aboard.
- 1991 – Nicaraguan Contras leader Enrique Bermúdez is assassinated in Managua.
- 1996 – A Chicago-bound Amtrak train, the Capitol Limited, collides with a MARC commuter train bound for Washington, D.C., killing 11 people.
- 1998 – China Airlines Flight 676 crashes into a road and residential area near Chiang Kai-shek International Airport in Taiwan, killing all 196 aboard and six more on the ground.
- 2000 – Emery Worldwide Airlines Flight 17 crashes near Sacramento Mather Airport in Rancho Cordova, California, killing all three aboard.
- 2005 – The Kyoto Protocol comes into force, following its ratification by Russia.
- 2005 – The National Hockey League cancels the entire 2004–05 regular season and playoffs.
- 2006 – The last Mobile army surgical hospital (MASH) is decommissioned by the United States Army.
- 2013 – A bomb blast at a market in Hazara Town, Quetta, Pakistan kills more than 80 people and injures 190 others.
- 2021 – Five thousand people gathered in the town of Kherrata, Bejaia Province to mark the second anniversary of the Hirak protest movement. Demonstrations had been suspended because of the COVID-19 pandemic in Algeria.

== Births ==
=== Pre-1600 ===
- 1222 – Nichiren, founder of Nichiren Buddhism (died 1282)
- 1304 – Jayaatu Khan Tugh Temür, Chinese emperor (died 1332)
- 1331 – Coluccio Salutati, Italian political leader (died 1406)
- 1419 – John I, Duke of Cleves (died 1481)
- 1470 – Eric I, Duke of Brunswick-Lüneburg (died 1540)
- 1471 – Krishnadevaraya, emperor of the Vijayanagara Empire (died 1529)
- 1497 – Philip Melanchthon, German astronomer, theologian, and academic (died 1560)
- 1514 – Georg Joachim Rheticus, Austrian cartographer and instrument maker (died 1574)
- 1519 – Gaspard II de Coligny, French admiral (died 1572)
- 1543 – Kanō Eitoku, Japanese painter and educator (died 1590)

=== 1601–1900 ===
- 1620 – Frederick William, Elector of Brandenburg (died 1688)
- 1643 – John Sharp, English archbishop (died 1714)
- 1698 – Pierre Bouguer, French mathematician, geophysicist, and astronomer (died 1758)
- 1727 – Nikolaus Joseph von Jacquin, Austrian botanist, chemist, and mycologist (died 1817)
- 1740 – Giambattista Bodoni, Italian publisher and engraver (died 1813)
- 1761 – Jean-Charles Pichegru, French general (died 1804)
- 1774 – Pierre Rode, French violinist and composer (died 1830)
- 1786 – Maria Pavlovna, Russian Grand Duchess (died 1859)
- 1802 – Phineas Quimby, American mystic and philosopher (died 1866)
- 1804 – Karl Theodor Ernst von Siebold, German physiologist and zoologist (died 1885)
- 1812 – Henry Wilson, American colonel and politician, 18th Vice President of the United States (died 1875)
- 1821 – Heinrich Barth, German explorer and scholar (died 1865)
- 1822 – Francis Galton, English biologist and statistician (died 1911)
- 1824 – Peter Kosler, Slovenian lawyer, geographer, and cartographer (died 1879)
- 1826 – Joseph Victor von Scheffel, German poet and author (died 1886)
- 1830 – Lars Hertervig, Norwegian painter (died 1902)
- 1831 – Nikolai Leskov, Russian author, playwright, and journalist (died 1895)
- 1834 – Ernst Haeckel, German biologist, physician, and philosopher (died 1919)
- 1838 – Henry Adams, American journalist, historian, and author (died 1918)
- 1841 – Armand Guillaumin, French painter (died 1927)
- 1843 – Henry M. Leland, American engineer and businessman, founded Cadillac and Lincoln (died 1932)
- 1845 – George Kennan, American journalist and explorer (died 1924)
- 1848 – Hugo de Vries, Dutch botanist, geneticist, and academic (died 1935)
- 1848 – Octave Mirbeau, French journalist, novelist, and playwright (died 1917)
- 1856 – Ossian Everett Mills, American academic, founded Phi Mu Alpha Sinfonia (died 1920)
- 1866 – Billy Hamilton, American baseball player and manager (died 1940)
- 1873 – Radoje Domanović, Serbian journalist and author (died 1908)
- 1876 – G. M. Trevelyan, English historian and academic (died 1962)
- 1877 – Tom Crean, Irish seaman and Antarctic explorer (died 1938)
- 1878 – Pamela Colman Smith, English occultist and illustrator (died 1951)
- 1878 – James Colosimo, Italian-American mob boss (died 1920)
- 1884 – Robert J. Flaherty, American director and producer (died 1951)
- 1887 – Kathleen Clifford, American actress (died 1962)
- 1891 – Hans F. K. Günther, German eugenicist and academic (died 1968)
- 1893 – Katharine Cornell, American actress and producer (died 1974)
- 1896 – Eugénie Blanchard, French super-centenarian (died 2010)

=== 1901–present ===
- 1901 – Wayne King, American singer-songwriter and conductor (died 1985)
- 1901 – Chester Morris, American actor (died 1970)
- 1902 – Cyril Vincent, South African cricketer (died 1968)
- 1903 – Edgar Bergen, American ventriloquist and actor (died 1978)
- 1904 – James Baskett, American actor and singer (died 1948)
- 1904 – George F. Kennan, American historian and diplomat, United States Ambassador to the Soviet Union (died 2005)
- 1905 – Henrietta Barnett, English Women's Royal Air Force officer (died 1985)
- 1906 – Vera Menchik, Russian-Czechoslovak-British chess player (died 1944)
- 1909 – Hugh Beaumont, American actor and director (died 1982)
- 1909 – Richard McDonald, American businessman, co-founded McDonald's (died 1998)
- 1914 – Jimmy Wakely, American country music singer-songwriter and actor (died 1982)
- 1916 – Bill Doggett, American pianist and composer (died 1996)
- 1919 – Georges Ulmer, Danish-French actor and composer (died 1989)
- 1920 – Anna Mae Hays, American general (died 2018)
- 1921 – Jean Behra, French race car driver (died 1959)
- 1921 – John Galbraith Graham, English priest and academic (died 2013)
- 1921 – Vera-Ellen, German-American actress, singer, and dancer (died 1981)
- 1922 – Heinz-Wolfgang Schnaufer, German soldier and pilot (died 1950)
- 1923 – Samuel Willenberg, Polish-Israeli sculptor and painter (died 2016)
- 1925 – Ed Emshwiller, American illustrator and experiment film maker (died 1990)
- 1926 – Margot Frank, German-Dutch holocaust victim (died 1945)
- 1926 – John Schlesinger, English actor and director (died 2003)
- 1927 – June Brown, English actress (died 2022)
- 1929 – Gerhard Hanappi, Austrian footballer and architect (died 1980)
- 1929 – Peter Porter, Australian-English poet and educator (died 2010)
- 1931 – Otis Blackwell, American singer-songwriter and pianist (died 2002)
- 1931 – Bernie Geoffrion, Canadian ice hockey player and coach (died 2006)
- 1931 – Ken Takakura, Japanese actor and singer (died 2014)
- 1932 – Ahmad Tejan Kabbah, Sierra Leonean economist, lawyer, and politician, 3rd President of Sierra Leone (died 2014)
- 1932 – Gretchen Wyler, American actress, singer, and dancer (died 2007)
- 1934 – Ken Brown, English footballer and manager
- 1934 – August Coppola, American author and academic (died 2009)
- 1934 – Marlene Hagge, American golfer (died 2023)
- 1935 – Brian Bedford, English-American actor and director (died 2016)
- 1935 – Sonny Bono, American actor, singer, and politician (died 1998)
- 1935 – Stephen Gaskin, American activist, co-founded The Farm (died 2014)
- 1935 – Bradford Parkinson, American colonel and engineer
- 1935 – Kenneth Price, American painter and sculptor (died 2012)
- 1936 – Carl Icahn, American businessman and investor
- 1937 – Paul Bailey, British novelist, critic, and biographer
- 1937 – Valentin Bondarenko, Soviet aviator and cosmonaut (died 1961)
- 1937 – Yuri Manin, Russian-German mathematician and academic (died 2023)
- 1938 – John Corigliano, American composer and academic
- 1939 – Adolfo Azcuna, Filipino lawyer and judge
- 1940 – Hannelore Schmatz, German mountaineer (died 1979)
- 1941 – Kim Jong Il, North Korean commander and politician, 2nd Supreme Leader of North Korea (died 2011)
- 1942 – Yang Jen-fu, Taiwanese politician (died 2024)
- 1944 – Glyn Davies, Welsh farmer and politician
- 1944 – Richard Ford, American novelist and short story writer
- 1944 – António Mascarenhas Monteiro, Cape Verdean politician, 2nd President of Cape Verde (died 2016)
- 1947 – Jaroslav Kubera, Czech politician (died 2020)
- 1948 – Kaiketsu Masateru, Japanese sumo wrestler and coach (died 2014)
- 1950 – Peter Hain, Welsh politician, Secretary of State for Wales
- 1951 – William Katt, American actor
- 1952 – James Ingram, American singer-songwriter and producer (died 2019)
- 1952 – Peter Kitchen, English footballer
- 1953 – John Bradbury, English musician, songwriter, and producer (died 2015)
- 1953 – Lanny McDonald, Canadian ice hockey player and manager
- 1953 – Roberta Williams, American video game designer, co-founded Sierra Entertainment
- 1954 – Iain Banks, Scottish author and playwright (died 2013)
- 1954 – Margaux Hemingway, American model and actress (died 1996)
- 1954 – Michael Holding, Jamaican cricketer and sportscaster
- 1956 – Vincent Ward, New Zealand director and screenwriter
- 1957 – LeVar Burton, American actor, director, and producer
- 1958 – Natalie Angier, American author
- 1958 – Ice-T, American rapper and actor
- 1958 – Oscar Schmidt, Brazilian basketball player (died 2026)
- 1958 – Herb Williams, American basketball player and coach
- 1959 – John McEnroe, American tennis player and sportscaster
- 1959 – Kelly Tripucka, American basketball player and sportscaster
- 1960 – Pete Willis, English guitarist and songwriter
- 1961 – Niko Nirvi, Finnish journalist
- 1961 – Andy Taylor, English singer-songwriter, guitarist, and producer
- 1962 – John Balance, English singer-songwriter (died 2004)
- 1964 – Bebeto, Brazilian footballer and manager
- 1964 – Christopher Eccleston, English actor
- 1965 – Dave Lombardo, Cuban-American musician and songwriter
- 1967 – Keith Gretzky, Canadian ice hockey player and coach
- 1968 – Warren Ellis, English author and screenwriter
- 1970 – Angelo Peruzzi, Italian footballer and manager
- 1971 – Michael Avenatti, American attorney and pundit
- 1971 – Craig Laundy, Australian politician
- 1972 – Jerome Bettis, American football player
- 1972 – Zoran Čampara, Bosnian football player
- 1972 – Sarah Clarke, American actress
- 1972 – Naomi Nishida, Japanese actress
- 1973 – Cathy Freeman, Australian sprinter
- 1974 – Mahershala Ali, American actor
- 1974 – José Dominguez, Portuguese footballer and manager
- 1976 – Eric Byrnes, American baseball player and sportscaster
- 1976 – Kyo, Japanese singer-songwriter and producer
- 1977 – Ian Clarke, Irish-American computer scientist, founded Hyphanet
- 1977 – Ahman Green, American football player
- 1977 – Alexei Morozov, Russian ice hockey player and executive
- 1978 – Tia Hellebaut, Belgian high jumper and chemist
- 1978 – Wasim Jaffer, Indian cricketer
- 1978 – John Tartaglia, American actor, singer, and puppeteer
- 1979 – Stéphane Dalmat, French footballer
- 1979 – Eric Mun, American-South Korean singer and actor
- 1979 – Valentino Rossi, Italian motorcycle racer
- 1980 – Longineu W. Parsons III, French-American musician and songwriter
- 1981 – Jay Howard, English race car driver
- 1981 – Susanna Kallur, Swedish sprint hurdler
- 1981 – Jerry Owens, American baseball player
- 1981 – Qyntel Woods, American basketball player
- 1982 – Manny Delcarmen, American baseball player
- 1982 – Aleksandr Dmitrijev, Estonian footballer
- 1982 – Lupe Fiasco, American rapper
- 1982 – Rickie Lambert, English footballer
- 1983 – Agyness Deyn, English model, actress, and singer
- 1983 – Tuomo Ruutu, Finnish ice hockey player and coach
- 1984 – Sofia Arvidsson, Swedish tennis player
- 1984 – Oussama Mellouli, Tunisian swimmer
- 1985 – Simon Francis, English footballer
- 1985 – Stacy Lewis, American golfer
- 1985 – Ron Vlaar, Dutch footballer
- 1986 – Diego Godín, Uruguayan footballer
- 1986 – Shawne Williams, American basketball player
- 1987 – Luc Bourdon, Canadian ice hockey player (died 2008)
- 1987 – Theresa Goh, Singaporean swimmer
- 1987 – Tommy Milone, American baseball player
- 1987 – Jon Ossoff, American politician and filmmaker
- 1987 – Hasheem Thabeet, Tanzanian basketball player
- 1988 – Diego Capel, Spanish footballer
- 1988 – Denílson, Brazilian footballer
- 1988 – Korbinian Holzer, German ice hockey player
- 1988 – Zhang Jike, Chinese table tennis player
- 1988 – Andrea Ranocchia, Italian footballer
- 1988 – Kim Soo-hyun, South Korean actor and singer
- 1989 – Elizabeth Olsen, American actress
- 1990 – The Weeknd, Canadian singer-songwriter and producer
- 1991 – Sergio Canales, Spanish footballer
- 1992 – Nicolai Boilesen, Danish footballer
- 1992 – Zsófia Susányi, Hungarian tennis player
- 1994 – Annika Beck, German tennis player
- 1994 – Federico Bernardeschi, Italian footballer
- 1994 – Ava Max, American singer and songwriter
- 1995 – Denzel Curry, American rapper
- 1995 – Katy Dunne, English tennis player
- 1995 – Carina Witthöft, German tennis player
- 1997 – Jordan Greenway, American ice hockey player
- 1998 – An Hyejin, South Korean volleyball player
- 1998 – Kim Suji, South Korean diver
- 1999 – Ignatius Ganago, Cameroonian footballer
- 1999 – Marie Ulven Ringheim, Norwegian singer, songwriter and music producer
- 2000 – Koffee, Jamaican singer, songwriter and rapper
- 2000 – Coby White, American basketball player
- 2000 – Carlos Yulo, Filipino artistic gymnast
- 2001 – Yuki Naito, Japanese tennis player

== Deaths ==
=== Pre-1600 ===
- 549 – Zhu Yi, Chinese general (born 483)
- 902 – Mary the Younger, Byzantine saint (born 875)
- 1184 – Richard of Dover, Archbishop of Canterbury
- 1247 – Henry Raspe, Landgrave of Thuringia (born 1204)
- 1279 – Afonso III of Portugal (born 1210)
- 1281 – Gertrude of Hohenberg, queen consort of Germany (born c. 1225)
- 1390 – Rupert I, Elector Palatine (born 1309)
- 1391 – John V Palaiologos, Byzantine emperor (born 1332)
- 1531 – Johannes Stöffler, German mathematician and astronomer (born 1452)
- 1560 – Jean du Bellay, French cardinal and diplomat (born 1493)
- 1579 – Gonzalo Jiménez de Quesada, Spanish explorer (born 1509)

=== 1601–1900 ===
- 1645 – Gonzalo Fernández de Córdoba, Spanish general and politician, 24th Governor of the Duchy of Milan (born 1585)
- 1710 – Esprit Fléchier, French bishop and author (born 1632)
- 1721 – James Craggs the Younger, English politician, Secretary of State for the Southern Department (born 1686)
- 1754 – Richard Mead, English physician (born 1673)
- 1820 – Georg Carl von Döbeln, Swedish general (born 1758)
- 1862 – William Pennington, American lawyer and politician, 13th Governor of New Jersey, 23rd Speaker of the United States House of Representatives (born 1796)
- 1898 – Thomas Bracken, Irish-New Zealand journalist, poet, and politician (born 1843)
- 1899 – Félix Faure, French merchant and politician, 7th President of France (born 1841)

=== 1901–present ===
- 1907 – Giosuè Carducci, Italian poet and educator, Nobel Prize laureate (born 1835)
- 1912 – Nicholas of Japan, Russian-Japanese monk and saint (born 1836)
- 1917 – Octave Mirbeau, French journalist, novelist, and playwright (born 1848)
- 1919 – Vera Kholodnaya, Ukrainian actress (born 1893)
- 1928 – Eddie Foy Sr., American actor and dancer (born 1856)
- 1932 – Ferdinand Buisson, French academic and politician, Nobel Prize laureate (born 1841)
- 1932 – Edgar Speyer, American-English financier and philanthropist (born 1862)
- 1941 – Frida Felser, German opera singer and actress (born 1872)
- 1944 – Dadasaheb Phalke, Indian director, producer, and screenwriter (born 1870)
- 1957 – Josef Hofmann, Polish-American pianist and composer (born 1876)
- 1961 – Dazzy Vance, American baseball player (born 1891)
- 1964 – James M. Canty, American educator, school administrator, and businessperson (born 1865)
- 1967 – Smiley Burnette, American singer-songwriter and actor (born 1911)
- 1974 – John Garand, Canadian-American engineer, designed the M1 Garand Rifle (born 1888)
- 1975 – Morgan Taylor, American hurdler and coach (born 1903)
- 1977 – Janani Luwum, bishop, Church of Uganda, martyr (born c.1922)
- 1977 – Rózsa Péter, Hungarian mathematician (born 1905)
- 1980 – Erich Hückel, German physicist and chemist (born 1895)
- 1984 – M. A. G. Osmani, Bangladeshi general (born 1918)
- 1988 – Ye Shengtao, Chinese writer, educator, and politician (born 1894)
- 1990 – Keith Haring, American painter and activist (born 1958)
- 1991 – Enrique Bermúdez, Nicaraguan lieutenant and engineer (born 1932)
- 1992 – Angela Carter, English novelist, short story writer (born 1940)
- 1992 – Jânio Quadros, Brazilian politician, 22nd President of Brazil (born 1917)
- 1992 – Herman Wold, Norwegian-Swedish economist and statistician (born 1908)
- 1996 – Roberto Aizenberg, Argentinian painter and sculptor (born 1922)
- 1996 – Roger Bowen, American actor and author (born 1932)
- 1996 – Pat Brown, American lawyer and politician, 32nd Governor of California (born 1905)
- 1996 – Brownie McGhee, American singer-songwriter and guitarist (born 1915)
- 1997 – Chien-Shiung Wu, Chinese-American physicist and academic (born 1912)
- 1998 – Mary Amdur, American toxicologist and public health researcher (born 1908)
- 1998 – Sheu Yuan-dong, Taiwanese politician (born 1927)
- 2000 – Marceline Day, American actress (born 1908)
- 2000 – Lila Kedrova, Russian-French actress and singer
- 2000 – Karsten Solheim, Norwegian-American businessman, founded PING (born 1911)
- 2001 – Howard W. Koch, American director and producer (born 1916)
- 2001 – William Masters, American gynecologist and sexologist (born 1915)
- 2002 – Walter Winterbottom, English footballer and manager (born 1913)
- 2003 – Rusty Magee, American actor and composer (born 1955)
- 2004 – Doris Troy, American singer-songwriter (born 1937)
- 2006 – Johnny Grunge, American wrestler (born 1966)
- 2006 – Ernie Stautner, German-American football player and coach (born 1925)
- 2009 – Stephen Kim Sou-hwan, South Korean cardinal (born 1921)
- 2011 – Len Lesser, American actor (born 1922)
- 2011 – Justinas Marcinkevičius, Lithuanian poet and playwright (born 1930)
- 2012 – Gary Carter, American baseball player and coach (born 1954)
- 2012 – Elyse Knox, American model, actress, and fashion designer (born 1917)
- 2012 – John Macionis, American swimmer and lieutenant (born 1916)
- 2012 – Anthony Shadid, American journalist (born 1968)
- 2013 – Colin Edwards, Guyanese footballer (born 1991)
- 2013 – Grigory Pomerants, Russian philosopher and author (born 1918)
- 2013 – Tony Sheridan, English singer-songwriter and guitarist (born 1940)
- 2014 – Ken Farragut, American football player (born 1928)
- 2014 – Kralle Krawinkel, German guitarist (born 1947)
- 2014 – Michael Shea, American author (born 1946)
- 2015 – Lasse Braun, Algerian-Italian director, producer, and screenwriter (born 1936)
- 2015 – Lesley Gore, American singer-songwriter (born 1946)
- 2015 – R. R. Patil, Indian lawyer and politician, Deputy Chief Minister of Maharashtra (born 1957)
- 2015 – Lorena Rojas, Mexican actress and singer (born 1971)
- 2016 – Boutros Boutros-Ghali, Egyptian politician and diplomat, 6th Secretary-General of the United Nations (born 1922)
- 2019 – Bruno Ganz, Swiss actor (born 1941)
- 2021 – Gustavo Noboa, Ecuadorian politician, 42nd President of Ecuador (born 1937)
- 2024 – Alexei Navalny, Russian activist (born 1976)
- 2025 – Viktor Antonov, Bulgarian artist (born 1972)
- 2026 – Billy Steinberg, American songwriter (born 1950)
- 2026 – Frederick Wiseman, American filmmaker (born 1930)

== Holidays and observances ==
- Christian feast day:
  - Abda of Edessa
  - Elias and companions
  - Juliana of Nicomedia (Catholic Church)
  - Onesimus
  - Charles Todd Quintard (Episcopal Church (USA))
  - February 16 (Eastern Orthodox liturgics)
- Day of the Shining Star (Kim Jong Il's birthday) (North Korea)
- Restoration of Lithuania's Statehood Day, celebrate the independence of Lithuania from Russia and Germany in 1918 (Lithuania)
- Elizabeth Peratrovich Day (Alaska)
