= Operation Sandblast =

World's first submarine circumnavigation

- Part of the Cold War (1953–1962)
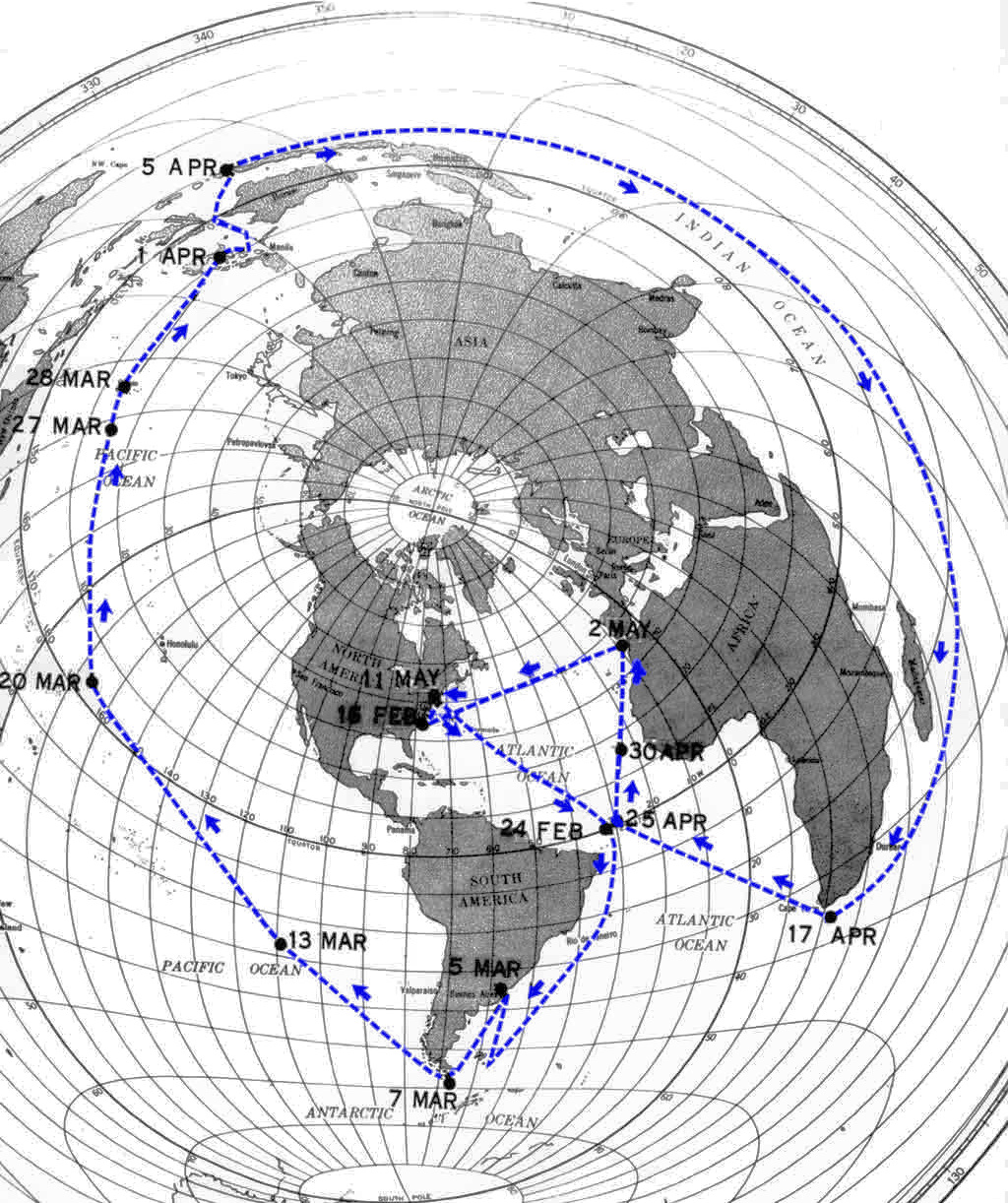
- Triton's navigational track and mission milestones
- Type: Nuclear submarine operation
- Location: World-wide
- Planned by: United States Navy
- Commanded by: Capt. Edward Beach, Jr.
- Objective: First submerged circumnavigation
- Date: February 24, 1960 – April 25, 1960
- Executed by: USS Triton (SSRN-586)
- Outcome: Successfully completed mission

Operation Sandblast was the code name for the first submarine circumnavigation of the world. It was executed by the United States Navy nuclear-powered radar picket submarine USS Triton (SSRN-586) in 1960 under the command of Captain Edward L. Beach Jr.

The circumnavigation took place between February 24 and April 25, 1960, covering 26,723 nautical miles (49,491 km; 30,752 mi) over 60 days and 21 hours. The route began and ended at the St. Peter and Paul Rocks in the middle of the Atlantic Ocean near the Equator. During the voyage, Triton crossed the equator four times while maintaining an average speed of 18 knots (33 km/h; 21 mph). Triton's overall navigational track during Operation Sandblast generally followed that of the Spanish expedition that achieved the first circumnavigation of the world, started under the command of Portuguese explorer Ferdinand Magellan and completed by Spanish explorer Juan Sebastián Elcano from 1519 to 1522.

The initial impetus for Operation Sandblast was to increase American technological and scientific prestige before the May 1960 Paris Summit between President Dwight D. Eisenhower and Soviet Premier Nikita Khrushchev. It also provided a high-profile public demonstration of the capability of U.S. Navy nuclear-powered submarines to carry out long-range submerged operations independent of external support and undetected by hostile forces, presaging the initial deployment of the Navy's Polaris ballistic missile submarines later in 1960. Finally, Operation Sandblast gathered extensive oceanographic, hydrographic, gravimetric, geophysical, and psychological data during Triton's circumnavigation.

Official celebrations were cancelled for Operation Sandblast following the diplomatic furor arising from the 1960 U-2 incident in which a U-2 spy plane was shot down over the Soviet Union in early May. However, Triton did receive the Presidential Unit Citation with a special clasp in the form of a golden replica of the globe in recognition of the successful completion of its mission, and Captain Beach received the Legion of Merit for his role as Triton's commanding officer. In 1961, Beach received the Magellanic Premium from the American Philosophical Society, the United States' oldest and most prestigious scientific award, for the voyage.

== Mission overview – Project Magellan ==
There is no doubt that sooner or later the USSR will put some nuclear submarine to sea. It would be a shame if we permit them to announce this to the world by virtue of some dramatic feat which we could have done ourselves. This could be Sputnik all over again, but without any excuses... "Project Magellan" is, in my estimation, head and shoulders above any of the remainder as a feat of submarine navigation and a demonstration of the global range of nuclear submarines.

— Captain Evan P. Aurand, U.S. Navy (January 6, 1960)

=== Mission origins ===
The possibility of a submerged circumnavigation of the world by a U.S. Navy nuclear-powered submarine was initially discussed between Captain Evan P. Aurand, President Eisenhower's naval aide, and Commander William R. Anderson, commanding officer of the first nuclear submarine, Nautilus, before it was decided to attempt a submerged voyage under the North Pole. Captain Aurand is credited with recommending that a successful submerged circumnavigation, timed to conclude just prior to the upcoming May 1960 Four Power Paris Summit between U.S. President Dwight D. Eisenhower and Soviet Premier Nikita Khrushchev, would provide a much needed boost to American prestige, and consequently this voyage, code-named Operation Sandblast, reflected the highest priority within the Eisenhower administration. Captain Aurand outlined this proposed submerged around the world voyage, Project Magellan, to Admiral Arleigh Burke, the Chief of Naval Operations, in a memorandum dated January 6, 1960. Admiral Burke's classified response dated January 18, 1960 acknowledged the technical feasibility of Project Magellan while further noting that the "Magellan route" could be transited in "56 days at 20 knots (37 km/h; 23 mph) and 75 days at 15 knots (28 km/h; 17 mph)," with the latter option costing an additional US$3.34 million in nuclear fuel consumed. Aurand forwarded his Project Magellan proposal and Burke's assessment to Press Secretary James C. Hagerty in a memorandum dated January 26, 1960. Project Magellan was subsequently approved by President Dwight D. Eisenhower, and USS Triton was specifically recommended by Aurand to undertake Project Magellan.

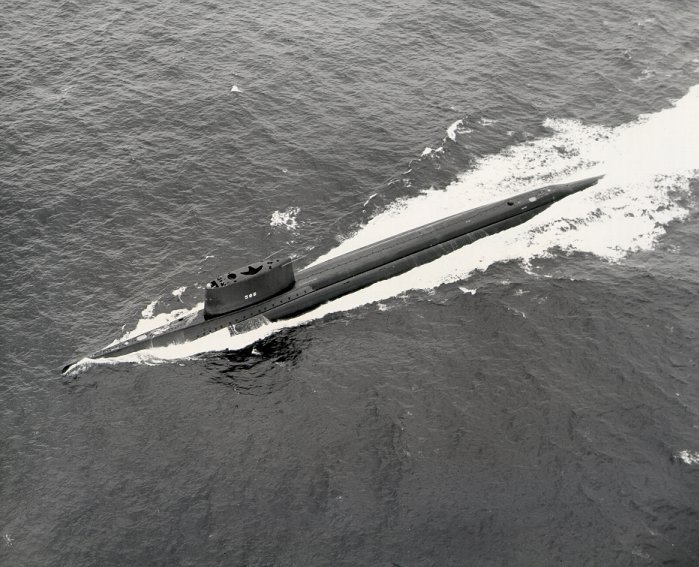
USS Triton (SSRN-586) during sea trials (September 27, 1959)

The U.S. Navy nuclear-powered radar picket submarine Triton (pictured) was the largest, most powerful, and most expensive submarine ever built at the time of her commissioning, costing $109,000,000 excluding the cost of her nuclear fuel and reactors. A unique submarine, she also had the distinction of being the only non-Soviet submarine to be powered by two nuclear reactors. Triton's high speed was derived from her twin-reactor nuclear propulsion plant, with a designed speed, surfaced and submerged, of 28 kn (32 mph; 52 km/h). On September 27, 1959, Triton achieved "well in excess of" 30 kn (35 mph; 56 km/h) during her initial sea trials. As originally designed, Triton's total reactor output was rated at 34,000 horsepower (25 MW), but she achieved 45,000 horsepower (34 MW) during her sea trials (pictured), and her first commanding officer believed Triton's plant could have reached 60,000 horsepower (45 MW) "had that been necessary."

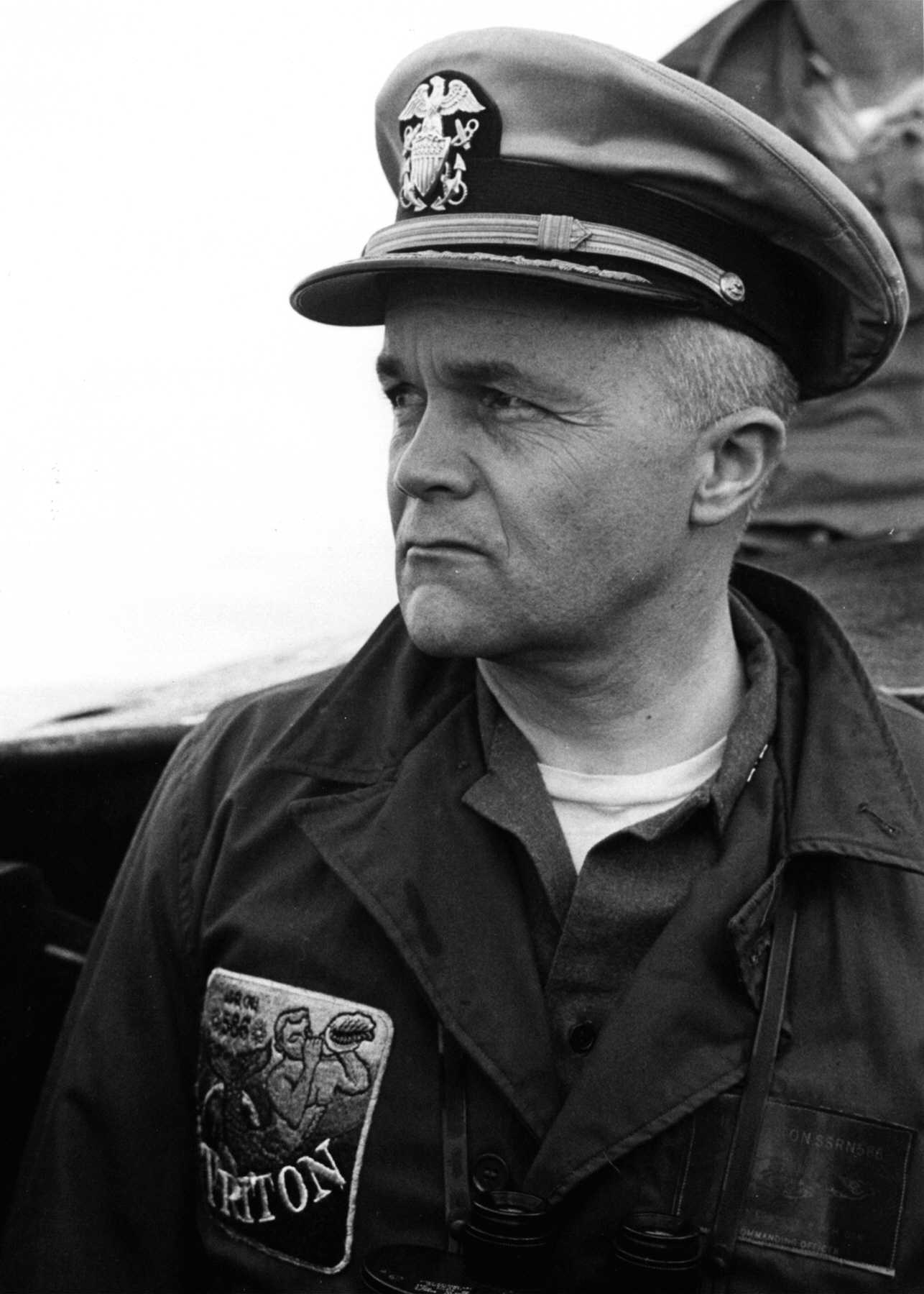
Captain Edward L. Beach, U.S. Navy, 1960

Triton's first commanding officer was Captain Edward L. Beach, Jr. (pictured), a highly decorated submarine officer who had participated in the Battle of Midway and 12 combat patrols during World War II, earning 10 decorations for gallantry, including the Navy Cross. After the war, Beach served as the naval aide to the President of the United States from 1953 to 1957, and he also was the best-selling author of the non-fiction book Submarine! and a novel Run Silent, Run Deep, which was made into a 1958 movie of the same name. In his last interview prior to his death in 2002, Captain Beach recalled Triton and the background to her historical mission:

As I was reporting to the Triton, I remember saying, "This ship is an unusual one. We've got to do something special with it. What could it be?" We talked about it a little bit, and nobody had any ideas. Finally, I got an idea. We'll do a stunt. We'll go around the world from North Pole to South Pole. That was my brainstorm. If you take a look at a map of the world, you'll see that's not a very easy way to go. So we didn't do that. But I do remember thinking of it. And I made a speech to the crew, advising them of my thinking—that we were going to put this ship on the map. Well, that died out. Suddenly ... a phone call came, asking me if I could be in Washington tomorrow.

Following her commissioning on November 10, 1959, Triton was assigned to Submarine Squadron 10 (Subron 10), the U.S. Navy's first all-nuclear force, based at the U.S. Submarine Base in New London, Connecticut, under the command of Commodore Thomas H. Henry. Triton subsequently completed torpedo trials at Naval Station Newport and conducted other special tests at the Norfolk Navy Base before returning to Electric Boat on December 7, 1959, to install special communications equipment, including a prototype of the BRA-3 towed communications buoy system housed in a large fairing located on the after end of the main deck. Work on Triton at Electric Boat was delayed as priority was given to completing the Navy's first two fleet ballistic missile (FBM) submarines, George Washington and Patrick Henry.

On January 20, 1960, Triton got underway to conduct an accelerated series of at-sea testing. Triton returned on February 1 as preparations continued for her forthcoming shakedown cruise, scheduled for departure on February 16, 1960, which involved operating with the command ship Northampton, flagship of the U.S. Second Fleet, in northern European waters. On February 1, Captain Beach received a message from Rear Admiral Lawrence R. Daspit, Commander Submarines Atlantic Fleet (COMSUBLANT), instructing Beach to attend a top secret meeting at The Pentagon on February 4.

=== Mission objectives ===
On February 4, 1960, Captain Edward L. Beach and Commodore Thomas H. Henry of Subron 10 arrived at the Pentagon in civilian attire to attend a top-secret, high-level meeting led by Vice Admiral Wallace M. Beakley, Deputy Chief of Naval Operations for Fleet Operations and Readiness. Also attending were Rear Admiral Lawson P. Ramage, Director of the Undersea Warfare Division, OPNAV; Captain Henry G. Munson, Director of the U.S. Navy Hydrographic Office, and staff representatives from the submarine type commands for the Atlantic and Pacific fleets. It was announced Triton's upcoming shakedown cruise was to be a submerged world circumnavigation, code-named Operation Sandblast, which would generally follow the track of the first circumnavigation in 1519–1522 started by Ferdinand Magellan and completed by Juan Sebastián Elcano. Triton would depart as scheduled on February 16, and the submarine would arrive back home no later than May 10, 1960. The mission objectives for Operation Sandblast were summarized below:

For purposes of geophysical and oceanographic research and to determine habitability, endurance and psychological stress – all extremely important to the Polaris program – it had been decided that a rapid round-the-world trip, touching the areas of interest, should be conducted. Maximum stability of the observing platform and unbroken continuity around the world were important. Additionally, for reasons of the national interest it had been decided that the voyage should be made entirely submerged undetected by our own or other forces and completed as soon as possible. TRITON, because of her size, speed and extra dependability of her two-reactor plant, had been chosen for the mission.

According to Captain Beach, the Navy came up with the code name of Sandblast because it was judged that taking his ship around the world submerged would "take a lot of sand" on the crew's part to be successful. Also, Sand served as Beach's personal code name during the mission. As the captain noted: "Most beaches are full of sand, I was informed."

=== Mission preparations ===
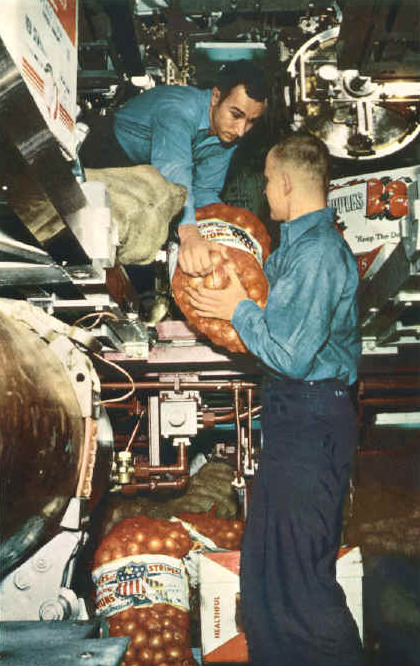
Loading ship's stores

Beach and Henry arrived back in New London at 5:45 a.m. on February 5. Later that morning, after breakfast, Beach briefed his officers, who Beach had insisted needed to know, about their new shakedown orders and the mission objectives for Operation Sandblast. The officers and crew of Triton had just 12 days to complete preparations for their much more ambitious, but top secret, shakedown cruise. With the exception of Chief Quartermaster (QMC) William J. Marshall, the enlisted personnel did not initially know the true nature of their upcoming mission. A cover story was devised that, following the shakedown cruise, Triton would proceed to the Caribbean Sea to undergo additional testing required by BuShips. The crew and civilian personnel were also instructed to file their federal income taxes early and take care of all other personal finances that might arise through mid-May.

Lt. Commander Will M. Adams, Triton's executive officer, and Lt. Commander Robert W. Bulmer, her operations officer, along with Chief Quartermaster Marshall, prepared the precise, mile-by-mile track of their upcoming voyage in the secure chart room, located at COMSUBLANT headquarters. Lt. Commander Robert D. Fisher, Triton's supply officer, coordinated loading of stores sufficient for a 120-day voyage (pictured). Eventually, some 77,613 lb (35,205 kg) of food were loaded on board, including 16,487 lb (7,478 kg) of frozen food, 6,631 lb (3,008 kg) of canned meat, 1,300 lb (590 kg) of coffee, and 1,285 lb (583 kg) of potatoes. Vice Admiral Hyman G. Rickover, the head of the U.S. Navy's Naval Reactors branch, sent special power-setting instructions for Triton's reactors, allowing them to operate with greater flexibility and a higher safety factor.

A key personnel change occurred on February 2 when Triton's veteran chief engineering officer, Lt. Commander Leslie D. Kelly, left for duty at the Rickover's Naval Reactors branch of the U.S. Atomic Energy Commission. His relief was his former assistant engineering officer, Lt. Commander Donald G. Fears.

Also, a number of supercargo personnel joined Triton for her shakedown cruise, with none aware of the top-secret nature of Operation Sandblast. Joseph Baylor Roberts was a well-known photographer from the National Geographic Magazine, and as a Commander in the U.S. Naval Reserve, he was recalled to active duty to serve as the press pool for the voyage with the U.S. Navy Office of Information. Additionally, Roberts and First Class Photographer's Mate (PH1) William R. Hadley, USN, detached from Naval Air Force U.S. Atlantic Fleet, coordinated the photo-reconnaissance aspects of Operation Sandblast.

The other civilian personnel included Benjamin B. Weybrew, a psychologist at U.S Naval Submarine Medical Research Laboratory, who would carry out a battery of psychological studies with volunteers from the crew. Geophysicist Michael Smalet, civil engineer Gordon E. Wilkes, and oceanographer Nicholas R. Mabry coordinated the various scientific and technical aspects of Operation Sandblast for the U.S. Navy's Hydrographic Office. Eldon C. Good monitored the Ship Inertial Navigation System (SINS) prototype, newly installed onboard Triton by the Sperry Gyroscopic Company. Frank E. McConnell was the Electric Boat guaranty representative assigned to Triton's shakedown cruise.

On February 15, 1960, Triton went to sea to do a final check of all shipboard equipment. Except for a malfunctioning wave-motion sensor, Triton was deemed ready for her shakedown cruise.

== Mission history – Around the world submerged 1960 ==
The sea may yet hold the key to the salvation of man and his civilization. That the world may better understand this, the Navy directed a submerged retrace of Ferdinand Magellan's historic circumnavigation. The honor of doing it fell to the Triton, but it has been a national accomplishment; for the sinews and the power which make up our ship, the genius which designed her, the thousands and hundreds of thousands who labored, each at his own metier, in all parts of the country, to build her safe, strong, self-reliant, are America. Triton, a unit of their Navy, pridefully and respectfully dedicates this voyage to the people of the United States.

— Captain Edward L. Beach, Jr., U.S. Navy (2 May 1960)

=== Outward bound ===
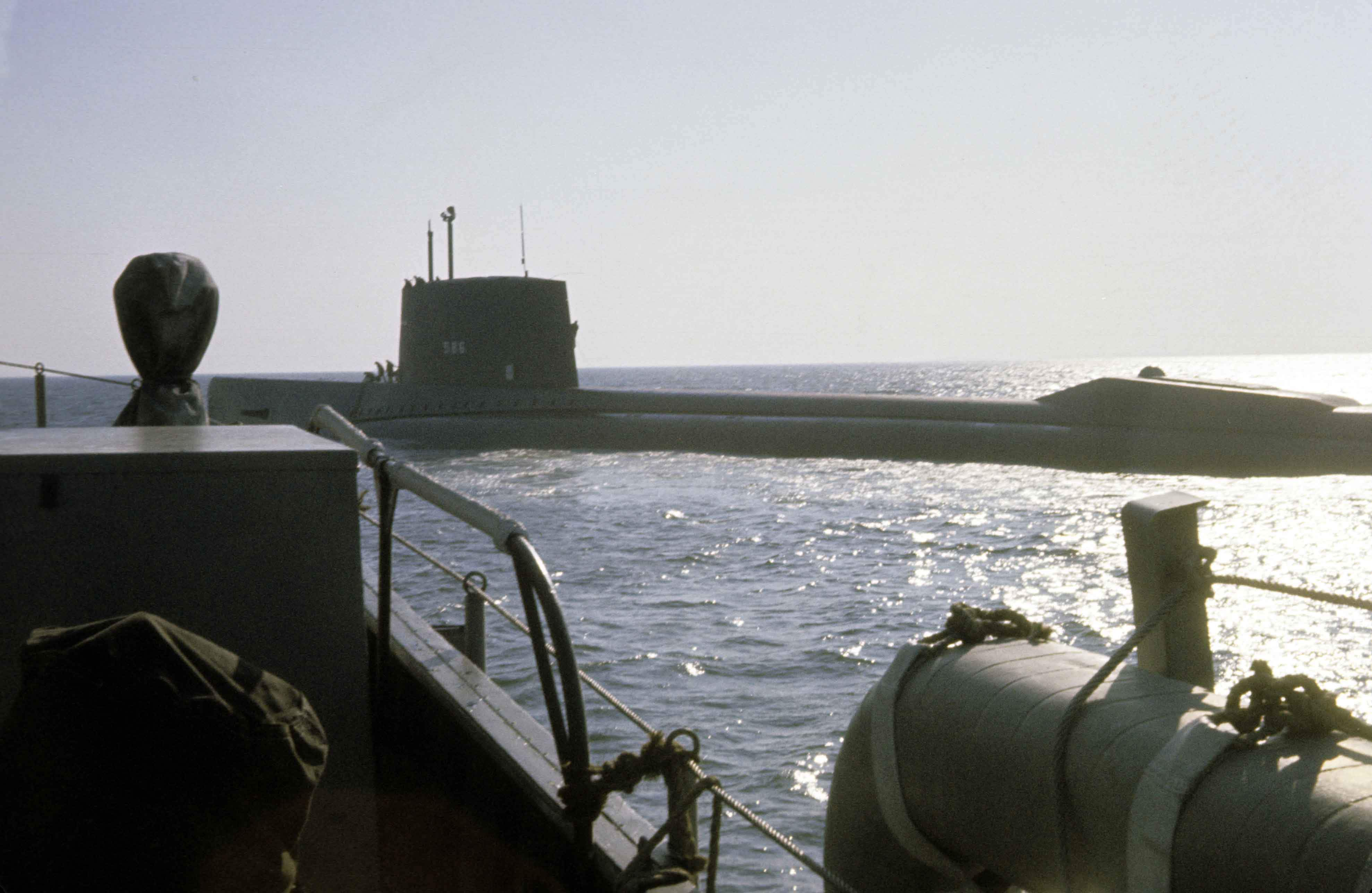
Departure (February 16, 1960)

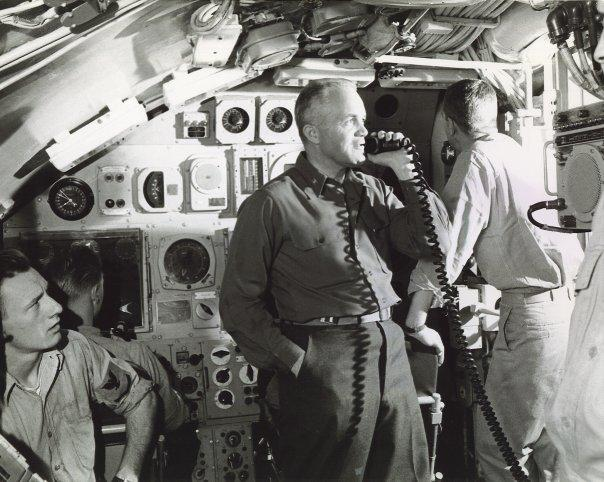
Making the announcement (February 17, 1960)

Triton departed New London on February 16, 1960, for what was announced as her shakedown cruise (pictured). Triton set course to the south-east (134 degrees true). At dawn on February 17, Triton performed her first morning star-sighting using the built-in sextant in her No. 1 periscope during the nightly ventilation of the shipboard atmosphere. The inboard induction valve was closed after the removal of a rusted flashlight that had prevented its closure.

Captain Beach announced the true nature of their shakedown cruise (pictured):

Men, I know you've all been waiting to learn what this cruise is about, and why we're still headed southeast. Now, at last, I can tell you that we are going on the voyage which all submariners have dreamed of ever since they possessed the means of doing so. We have the ship and we have the crew. We're going around the world, nonstop. And we're going to do it entirely submerged.

Regarding the upcoming voyage, Beach adopted a decidedly non-traditional command style:

Early on, I realized that what this particular crew needed from me was not pressure but the light touch. Once informed of our objective, their enthusiasm infected everything they did, and here and there might easily have caused stress-related dysfunction. Extended separation from home and family with no means of communications was not a problem – submariners are used to that – but bearing down too much on the job might be. My concern was about our performance in an emergency, being at the same time unable to predict what emergencies might be in store for us. It was important, I thought, to hold back on the pressure until a really tough problem came up. This happened several times, as I knew it would, and I was glad I had something in reserve.

For the shakedown cruise, Beach adopted a specific weekly shipboard routine. Mondays and Tuesdays involved regular activities, with drills, lectures, school of the ship, and class programs from the noon to 1600 watch. Wednesdays had the crew on reduced activities that is traditionally known as Rope Yarn Sunday. Thursdays saw a schedule of regular drills, and Fridays involved upkeep and general maintenance activities known as Field Day. Saturdays had regular activities with afternoon drills, and Sundays had reduced activities with normal watches and religious observances.

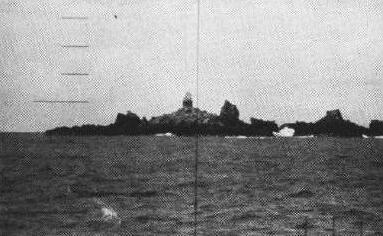
St. Peter and Paul Rocks (February 24, 1960)

Also, beginning on February 17 during the mid watch, Triton came to periscope depth to take a nightly fix using the built-in sextant in her celestial periscope, ventilate and replenish her shipboard atmosphere using the snorkel, and dispose of any shipboard garbage. Since Triton did not have a generator to extract oxygen from sea water, these nightly snorkeling activities were crucial to maintaining a suitable atmosphere.

Later that same day, February 17, 1960, Triton experienced a serious leak with a main condenser circulating water pump, and a reactor warning alarm tripped because of a defective electrical connection. Both incidents were handled successfully and did not affect the ship's performance.

On February 18 Triton conducted her first general daily drill and on February 19 released her first twice-daily hydrographic bottles, used to study ocean current patterns. Also on February 19, shipboard sensors detected a radiation leak. It was subsequently determined the radium dials on three wristwatches were the cause for the alarm, and once removed, no radiation was detected for the balance of the voyage. On February 23, Triton detected a previously uncharted seamount with her fathometer.

Beach maintained that the greatest challenge facing the crew was a seemingly mundane activity, garbage disposal and cleaning: "It was 84 days of strenuous work just keeping the ship clean. It was amazing how much dirt we created, so I had a field day every weekend. The crew started objecting until they saw how much trash we kept getting rid of. Then they couldn't object." To remove trash without surfacing, Triton had a garbage disposal unit (GDU), a small inverted torpedo tube that ejected a weighted bag of refuse through the bottom of the ship. However, if the GDU was temporarily out of commission due to repairs, as it was on February 22, the aft torpedo tubes were used, a less than optimum solution.

On February 24, Triton made her first landfall, reaching St. Peter and Paul Rocks (pictured) after traveling 3,250 nautical miles (6,020 km; 3,740 mi). The Rocks served as the home plate for Triton's submerged circumnavigation. Photographic reconnaissance was carried out by Lt. Richard M. Harris, the CIC/ECM officer, and Chief Cryptologic Technician (CTC) William R. Hadley, who served as the ship's secondary photo-recon team for the voyage. Triton turned south and crossed the equator for the first time later that day, passing into the Southern Hemisphere, with ship's personnel participating in the crossing the line ceremony (pictured).

=== Destination: Cape Horn ===
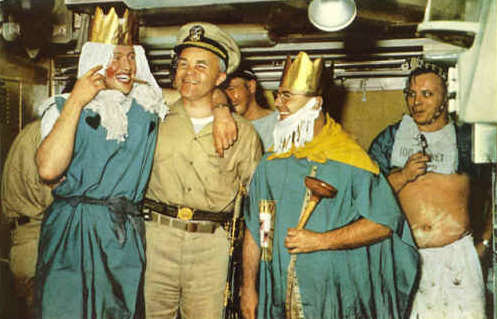
Crossing the Equator (February 24, 1960)

On March 1, 1960, as Triton passed along the east coast of South America, a trio of crises threatened to end Operation Sandblast prematurely. The first was when Chief Radarman (RDC) John R. Poole began suffering from a series of kidney stones. The second was when the ship's fathometer went out of commission, with its loss meaning Triton could no longer echo-sound the sea floor, increasing the danger of grounding or collision as the ship traveled through poorly charted waters. Captain Beach observed:

Fortunately at the present time we are in an area where the water is deeper than normal for the Atlantic and for a number of hours there is [no] worry about unexpectedly scraping the top of any unsuspected submerged peak. But we will want that fathometer badly as we approach Cape Horn.

Perhaps most critically, the third problem involved the readings on one of the reactors indicating a serious malfunction which required its shutdown. (Note: "In late February (1960) in the Atlantic, the USS Triton (SSN-586), shortly after departure for a submerged global circumnavigation, suffers a leak in a main condenser circulating water pump, necessitating the shutdown of the port reactor for five hours to effect repairs." Neptune Paper No. 3: Naval Accidents 1945–1988 by William M. Arkin and Joshua Handler, p. 27.) As Captain Beach noted, "So far as Triton and the first of March were concerned, it seemed that troubles were not confined to pairs. On that day we were to have them in threes."

Later that day, Lt. Milton R. Rubb and his electronics technician team returned the fathometer to operational status, and the Chief Engineer Donald D. Fears, Reactor Officer Lt. Cmdr. Robert P. McDonald, and Triton's engineering crew repaired the malfunctioning reactor. Since Poole's symptoms were intermittent, Triton continued south, although there was a detour to the Golfo Nuevo region when the ship investigated an unknown sonar contact. Contemporary news accounts reported the Argentine Navy had been encountering numerous unknown submarine contacts in the Golfo Nuevo during early 1960, but Triton's contact turned out to be a school of fish.

On March 3, Triton located the Falkland Islands on her radar and prepared to conduct photoreconnaissance of Stanley Harbor. Before they could visually sight the islands, Poole's condition worsened so much that—taking a calculated risk—Captain Beach reversed course, ordered flank speed, and sent a radio message to headquarters describing the situation. From the ship's log on that date, Beach noted:

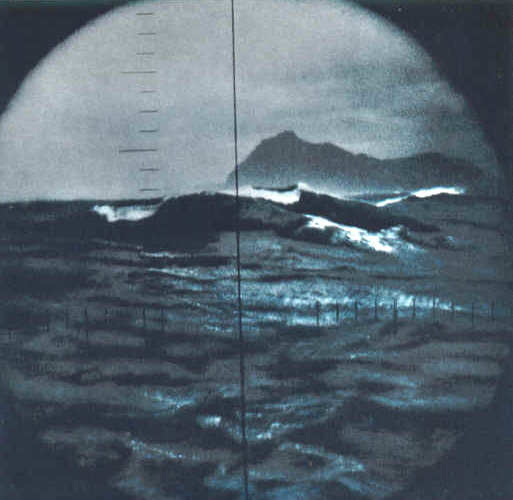
Cape Horn (March 7, 1960)

In the control and living spaces, the ship had quieted down, too. Orders were given in low voices; the men speak to each other, carrying out their normal duties, in a repressed atmosphere. A regular pall has descended upon us. I know that all hands are aware of the decision and recognize the need for it. Perhaps they are relieved that they did not have to make it. But it is apparent that this unexpected illness, something that could neither have been foreseen nor prevented, may ruin our submergence record.

Fortunately, the heavy cruiser Macon, with Captain Reuben T. Whitaker in command, had been on a good-will cruise to South American ports since January as the flagship for Rear Admiral Edward C. Stephan, Commander Naval Forces South Atlantic (Task Force 138). Macon had been in Argentine waters in conjunction with US President Eisenhower's visit to Argentina from February 26–29, 1960. In the early hours of March 5, Triton rendezvoused with Macon off Montevideo, Uruguay, after a diversion of over 2,000 nautical miles (3,700 km; 2,300 mi). Triton broached, exposing only her sail while preserving the submarine's hull's submerged status. A boat-handling party led by Lieutenant George A. Sawyer, the ship's gunnery officer, transferred Poole to the waiting whaleboat, which then returned to Macon. Poole was the only crew member who did not complete the voyage. Chief Radarman Poole was subsequently examined by both the doctors aboard Macon and at a hospital in Montevideo, but his third attack of kidney stones, which prompted his transfer off Triton, proved to be his last–and he did not require kidney surgery.

After the rendezvous, Triton dove and turned back southwards. She subsequently passed west of the Falklands, and rounded Cape Horn (pictured) through Estrecho de le Maire (Drake Passage) on March 7. Captain Beach described his first impressions of this legendary lands-end of the Western Hemisphere as "bold and forbidding, like the sway-backed profile of some prehistoric sea monster." Captain Beach allowed all the crew an opportunity to view Cape Horn through the ship's periscope, requiring five reverses of Triton's course to keep the cape in sight.

=== Across the Pacific ===
On March 7, Triton entered the Pacific Ocean and passed into the operational control of Rear Admiral Roy S. Benson, Commander Submarine Force U.S. Pacific Fleet (COMSUBPAC), who had been Captain Beach's commanding officer while he served on the fleet submarine Trigger (SS-237) in the Pacific War. Triton would not see land for the next 2,500 nautical miles (4,600 km; 2,900 mi).

On March 8, Triton detected a seamount, registering a minimum depth of 350 fathoms (640 m; 2,100 ft), with a total height of 7,000 feet (2,100 m) above the ocean floor. On the same day, Triton conducted a successful drill simulating the emergency shutdown of both her reactors and loss of all power.

Two days later, the starboard propshaft seal sprung a major leak in the after engine room. (Note: "03/01/60: In the beginning of March the USS Triton (SSN-586), while traveling down the Atlantic, springs a severe leak in its starboard propeller shaft due to loose bolts and an improperly installed water seal." Neptune Paper No. 3: Naval Accidents 1945–1988 by William M. Arkin and Joshua Handler, p. 27.) A makeshift locking clamp was jury-rigged to contain the leak.

On March 12, the trouble-plagued fathometer ceased operation when its transducer header flooded, grounding out the entire system. Since the transducer head was located outside the boat's pressure hull, it could not be repaired except in drydock. Without an operational fathometer, Triton could be vulnerable to grounding or collision with uncharted submerged formations. (It was later determined that the cabling to Triton's fathometer head, located in the bulbous forefoot of her bow, had not been properly insulated, and the constant buffeting from Triton's high speed caused these cables to rupture, rendering the fathometer inoperable.) An alternative to the fathometer was devised, using the ship's active forward search sonar in conjunction with the gravity meter installed in the combat intelligence center (CIC). By using both systems in tandem, underwater masses could be detected and avoided, although this approach lacked the capability of the fathometer to echo-sound the depth of the ocean floor. On March 13, Triton detected a submerged peak using active sonar and the gravity meter that confirmed the feasibility of this procedure.

Triton spotted Easter Island on that same day, March 13, 1960, first by radar, then by periscope. The northeastern coast of the island was photographed for two and a half hours before the statue that Thor Heyerdahl had erected was spotted. The entire crew was invited to observe through the periscope before Triton departed for her next visual landfall of Guam, some 6,734 nautical miles (12,471 km; 7,749 mi) distant.

On March 17, a malfunctioning air compressor was repaired. This required the complete re-wiring of the compressor's armature, a task ordinarily done aboard a submarine tender or in a shipyard. Captain Beach was impressed by "this spirit and outlook [that] permeated our crew." He was also "astonished" by two different makeshift fathometer sound transmitters created by the electronics and engineering crewmen. One was based on a general announcing speaker, the other used a stainless steel cooking pot from the galley, with stainless steel rods and copper wiring. Beach noted in the ship's log: "I could only marvel at the ingenuity of the American sailor."

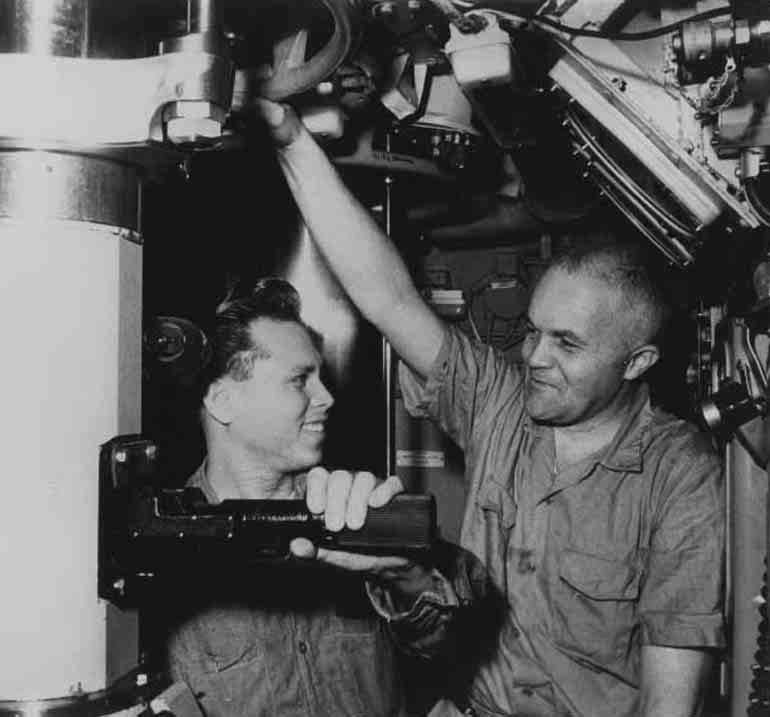
Petty Officer Edward Carbullido (left) and Captain Beach, off Guam (March 28, 1960)

On March 19, Triton detected another submerged peak, using its sonar and gravity meter, and crossed the equator a second time, returning to the Northern Hemisphere.

Another submerged peak was successfully detected on March 20. Later that day, Triton made her closest approach to Pearl Harbor, and the crew celebrated with a luau.

Triton crossed the International Date Line on March 23, losing March 24 from her calendar. The next day, sonar indicated another previously uncharted rise from the ocean floor, logged with a depth of 350 fathoms (640 m; 2,100 ft).

Two days later, March 27, Triton passed the point of closest approach to the location where her namesake was lost during World War II, and a memorial service was held to commemorate the occasion. A submerged naval gun salute was fired to honor the lost crew when three water slugs were shot in quick succession from the forward torpedo tubes.

On the morning of March 28, Triton spotted Guam and observed activity on shore via her periscope. Petty Officer Edward Carbullido (pictured), who had been born on Guam but away for 14 years, was asked to identify his parents' house through the periscope while the boat remained submerged in Agat Bay. (Carbullido was subsequently able to go home to Guam for Christmas Day 1960 on a 60-day leave, with the cost of his flight paid for by selling a magazine article on Triton's circumnavigation written by Captain Beach, and with the assistance of Pan American Airways. Captain Beach subsequently wrote an account of Carbullido's visit for the November 1961 issue of The American Legion Magazine.) Triton then changed course for the Philippines, the midpoint of her around-the-world voyage.

=== The Philippines ===
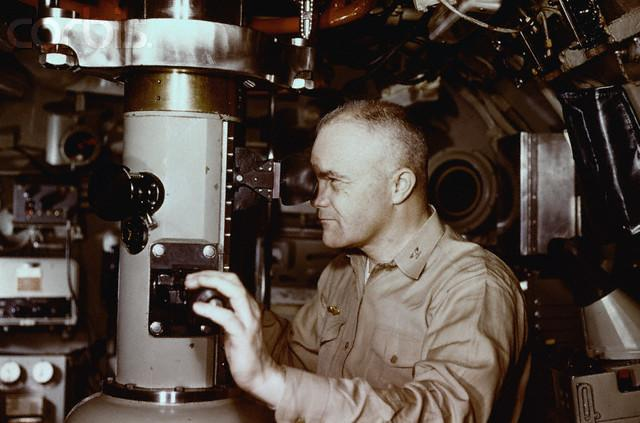
Captain Beach at periscope station

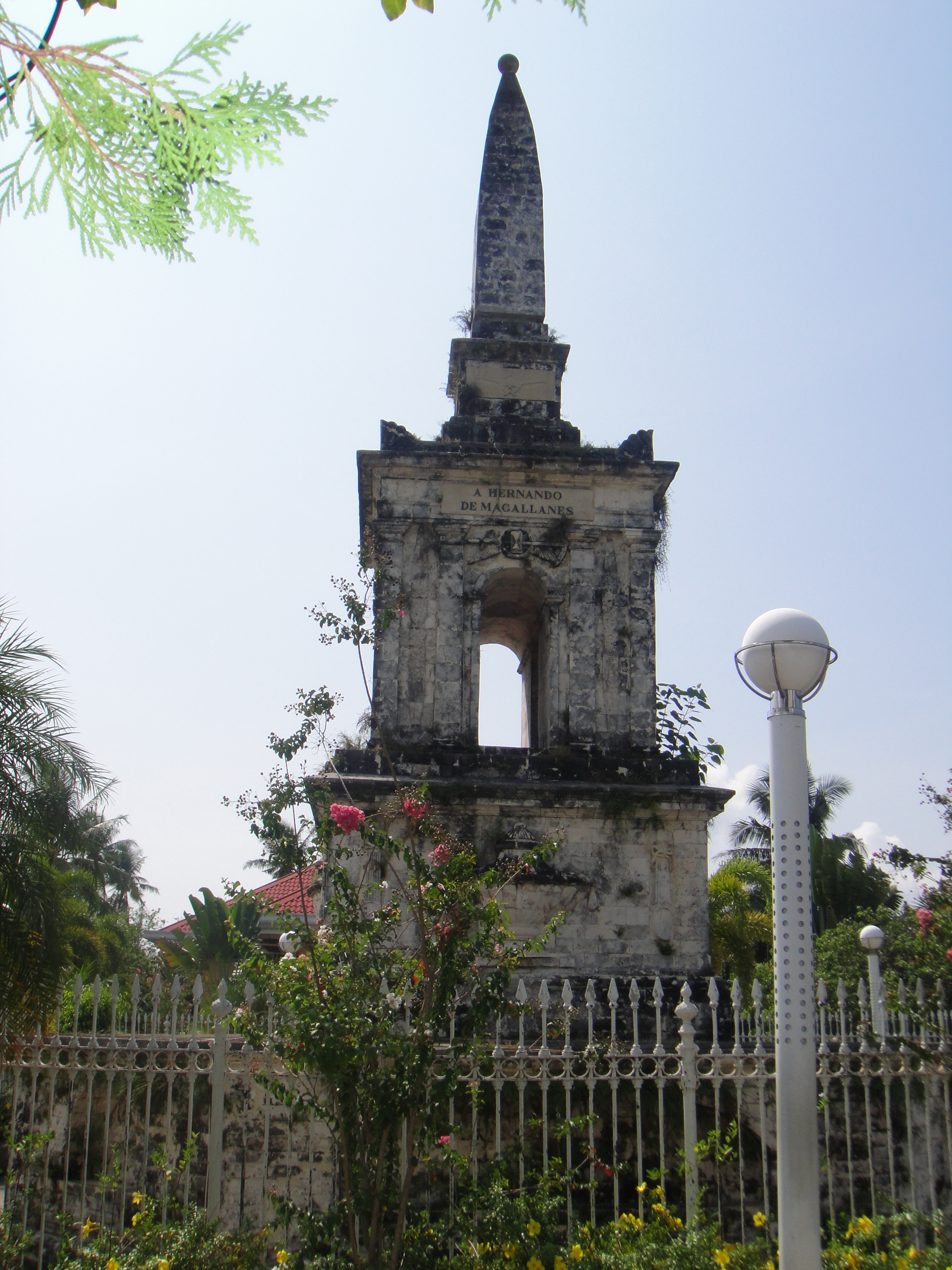
The memorial shrine of Ferdinand Magellan in Mactan Island, Cebu

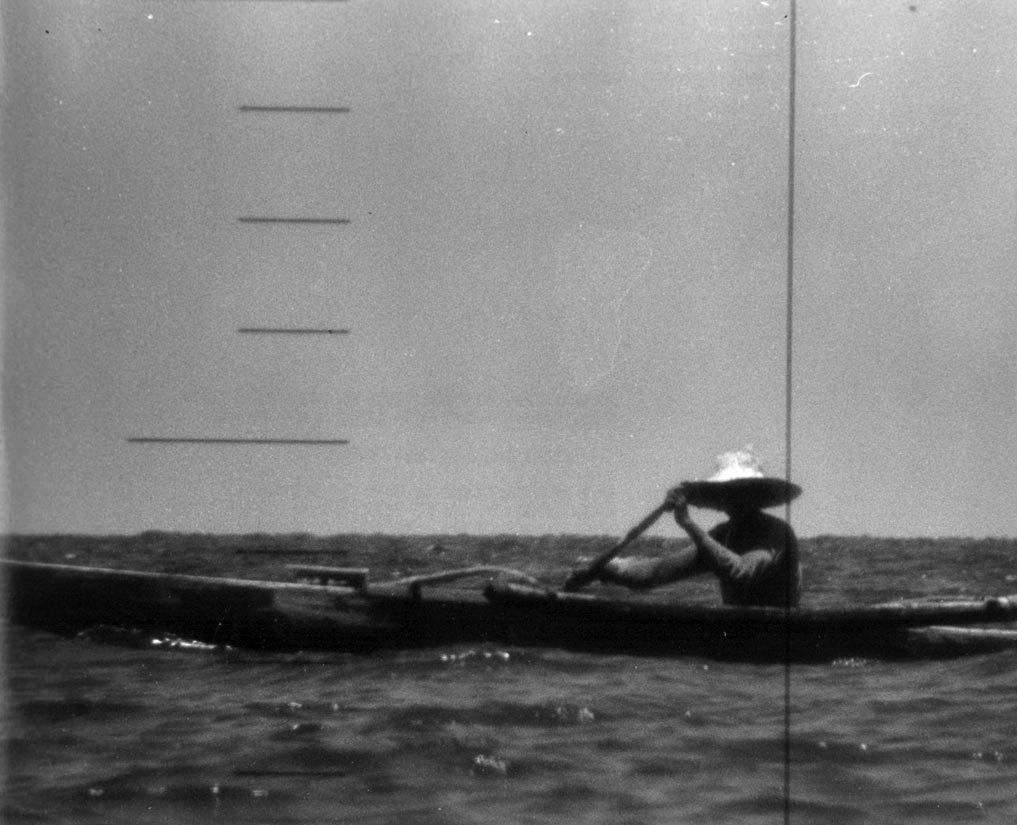
Off Mactan Island (April 1, 1960)

On March 31, Triton crossed over the Philippine Trench and began threading her way through the vast Philippine archipelago, passing from the Philippine Sea through the Surigao Strait and then the Mindanao Sea, and finally through the Bohol Strait into the Camotes Sea.

A special water sample was taken during Triton's transit of Surigao Strait; its recipient was the retired Vice Admiral Jesse B. Oldendorf, the task force commander whose battleships had defeated the Japanese Southern Force during the Battle of Surigao Strait, history's last naval action fought between battleships, during World War II. Captain Beach observed, "We think that Admiral Oldendorf will appreciate a sample of this body of water."

On April 1, Triton spotted Mactan Island, and shortly before noon, sighted the monument (pictured) commemorating the death of Ferdinand Magellan at that site, thereby reaching the midpoint of her circumnavigation.

Ordinarily a leader given to the most meticulous preparations for any important undertaking, one who personally checked every item and left no stone unturned in his effort to eliminate any possible cause of failure, Magellan's every action during this entire episode ... might almost have been calculated with the intention of seeking defeat. Such was the height of his religious fervor that divine intervention was expected as a matter of course. God, having brought him this far, would not forsake him now. So must have thought Magellan in the height of his exaltation, forgetting entirely that God is not bound by the conventions of man's thought.

— Captain Edward L. Beach on Magellan and his demise

Later that same day, April Fool's Day, Triton was sighted by the only unauthorized person to spot the submarine during her top secret voyage–a young Filipino man in a small dugout canoe (pictured) about 50 yards (46 m) off Triton's beam, staring at her raised periscope. Captain Beach later recorded his reactions to this unexpected encounter in his log:

It is a ludicrous situation: On one hand an impassive Asian, staring with curious concentration at an unusual object in the water; on the other, a U.S. Navy officer, equipped with all technical devices money and science can procure, looking back with equally studied concentration. On one end of the periscope, an outrigger canoe propelled by the brawny arms of its builder; on the other end, a $100,000,000 submarine, the newest, biggest, most powerful in the world, on a history-making voyage. What an abyss – what centuries of scientific development – lie between me and him!

— Edward L. Beach, Triton's log

The noted photographer Joseph Baylor Roberts of National Geographic magazine was able to snap several photos of this unexpected interloper (pictured) through the ship's periscope before Triton moved out of range. The November 1960 issue identified the fisherman as 19-year-old Rufino Baring of Punta Engano, Mactan Island, who believed he had encountered a sea monster: "I was very frightened. I tried to get away as fast as I could."

Later on the afternoon of April 1, Triton proceeded through Hilutangan Channel into the Sulu Sea via Bohol Strait.

On April 2, Triton's gyroscopic repeaters, used to maintain the ship's navigational bearing, began to experience sudden, severe oscillations, possibly caused by a malfunctioning synchro amplifier. The helm was shifted to direct gyro input, the synchro amplifiers were checked out, and the gyroscopic repeaters appeared to return to normal function. Later, while transiting the Pearl Bank Passage, a narrow channel lined with coral reefs, a periscope observation determined that Triton was off course, indicating a potentially hazardous helm error. Steering control was immediately shifted to the control room, with the helm using the master gyroscopic repeater. While the malfunction was detected in time and the ship was not in any immediate danger, the loss of navigational bearing could have been catastrophic, with Captain Beach noting that "the episode had a sobering effect."

Triton then proceeded through the Sibutu Passage into the Celebes Sea, leaving Philippine waters, and subsequently entered Makassar Strait, crossing the equator a third time, on April 3, and then, during April 4, transited the Flores Sea, bound for Lombok Strait, the gateway to the Indian Ocean.

=== Indian Ocean ===
On April 5, Triton entered the Indian Ocean via the Lombok Strait. The transition proved dramatic. The change in salinity and density of the seawater caused her to dive abruptly from periscope depth to 125 feet (38 m) in about 40 seconds. Captain Beach noted, "I had experienced changes in water density many times before, but never one of this magnitude." Triton returned to periscope depth and subsequently entered the Indian Ocean.

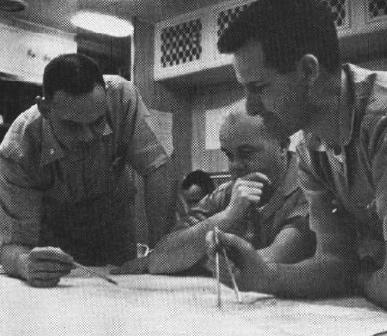
Triton's navigators

While crossing the Indian Ocean, Triton conducted a sealed-ship experiment. Beginning April 10, rather than refreshing the air in the ship by snorkeling each night, she remained sealed, using compressed air to make up for consumed oxygen, as well as burning "oxygen candles" to replenish the ship's atmosphere. Also, starting on April 15, the smoking lamp was extinguished, with no tobacco smoking permitted anywhere aboard the ship.

During this smoking ban, Dr. Benjamin Weybrew carried out a battery of tests on crew volunteers, both smokers and non-smokers, to measure cardiovascular functions and psychological stress indices to determine the effects that the prohibition of tobacco had on individual and group performance of the test subjects. The objective of this experiment was to determine the advisability of prohibiting the use of tobacco from submarine operations given the extended submerged duration of missions involving nuclear-powered submarines.

The test results determined that smokers showed consistently higher mean oral temperature and pulse rate, both at rest and following exercises, as well as significantly increased pulse rates over non-smokers, a marked decrease in alertness, and an increase in insomnia symptoms. However, there was no significant difference in blood pressure between smokers and non-smokers. Finally, smokers experienced "debilitative performance decrements" during the smoking prohibition, and as a consequence, this also affected the morale of non-smokers, both among the participants in the experiment as well as non-participants. Dr. Weybrew concluded smoking should be avoided because of its attendant health and relational issues, and that not smoking enhances one's overall stress coping capacity (SCC).

At the 1963 convention of the Cigar Institute of America, Weybrew noted: "When a smoker is forbidden to smoke he just doesn't like it. The smokers in the test got irritable, ate too much, had trouble sleeping, and personal relationships began to deteriorate."

On Easter Sunday, April 17, Triton sighted the Cape of Good Hope and subsequently re-entered the South Atlantic Ocean, returning to the command authority of Rear Admiral Lawrence R. Daspit (COMSUBLANT).

=== Return to the St. Peter and St. Paul Rocks ===
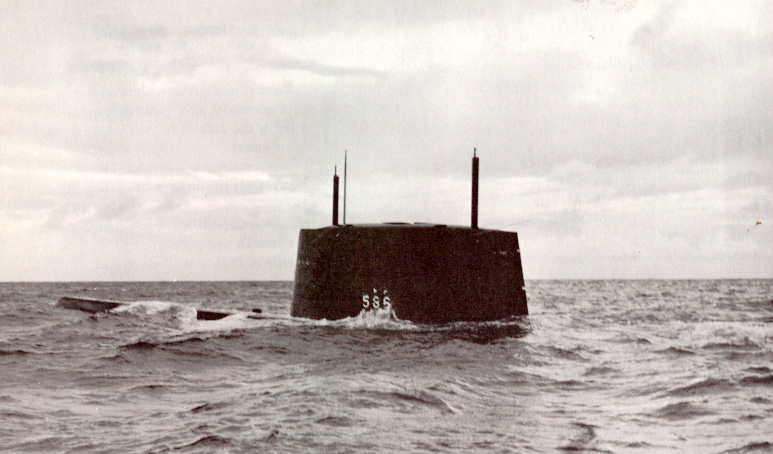
Off Cádiz, Spain (May 2, 1960)

The smoking lamp was re-lit on April 18, with the three days of prohibition having taken a noticeable toll on crew morale. Rather than passing the word in a traditional manner, Captain Beach demonstrated the lifting of the ban by walking through the ship smoking a cigar, blowing smoke in people's faces, and asking, "Don't you wish you could do this?" He recorded in his log that "it took some 37 seconds for the word to get around." On April 20, 1960, Triton crossed the Prime Meridian, and on April 24, the sealed atmosphere experiment was terminated.

On the same day that the sealed atmosphere experiment was terminated, April 24, 1960, Triton experienced a major equipment failure. In the aft torpedo room, a hydraulic line to the stern plane mechanism burst. Through the prompt action by Torpedoman's Mate Third Class Allen W. Steele, aided by Engineman Third Class Arlan F. Martin, this potentially catastrophic event was successfully contained. Eventually, the main hydraulic system was restored with a control valve from the steering system, but the boat's steering controls remained on emergency mode for the rest of the voyage. It was subsequently determined that the pipe burst was caused by a fractured valve. For his quick and decisive actions in handling this emergency, Steele was presented the Navy Commendation Medal.

On April 25, Triton crossed the Equator a final time, re-entering the Northern Hemisphere, and shortly thereafter, she sighted the St. Peter and Paul Rocks, completing the first submerged circumnavigation. As Captain Beach wrote, "We are not yet home, but we may be considered to have taken a long lead off third base."

=== Homeward bound ===
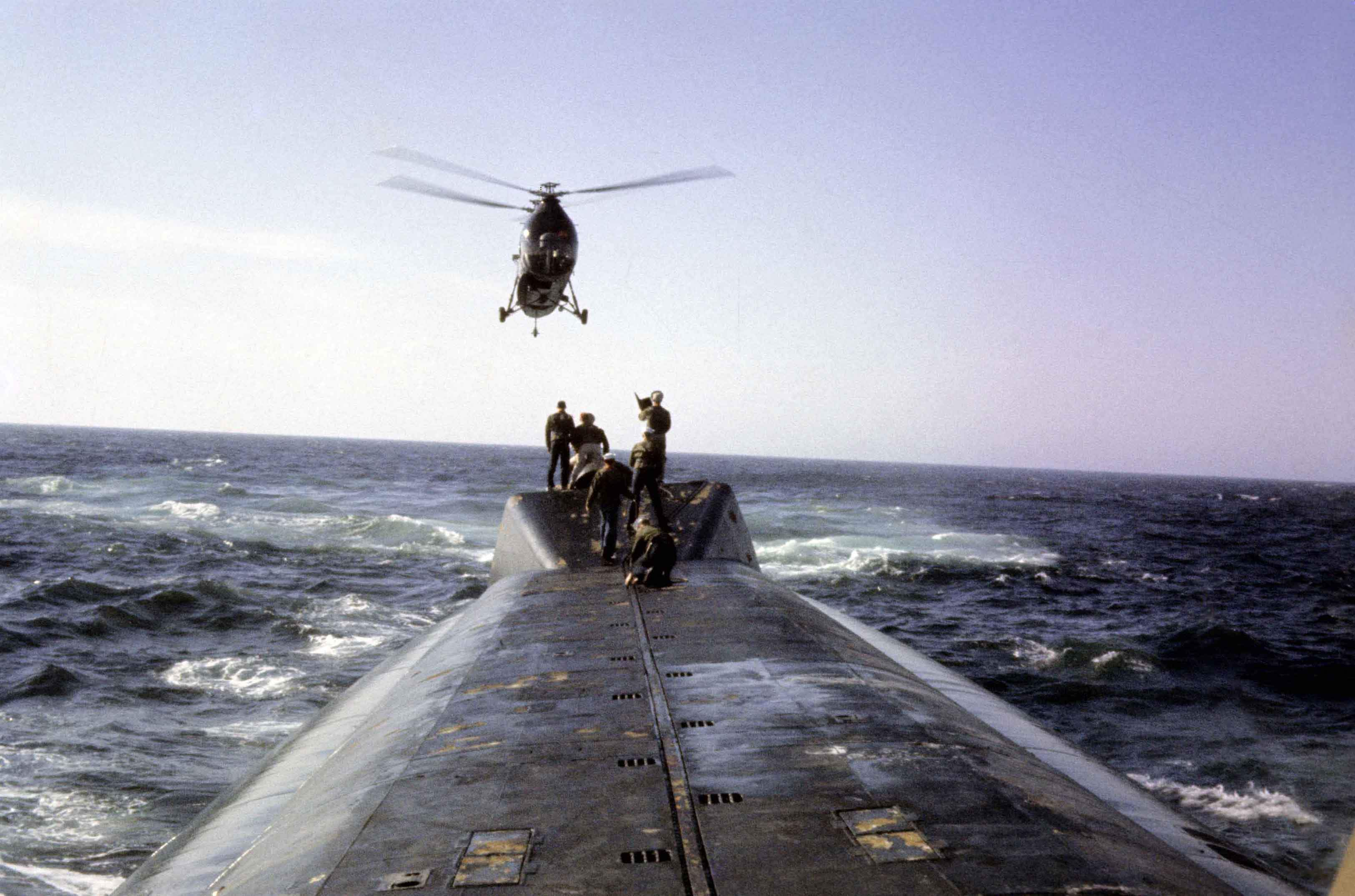
Off Rehoboth Beach, Delaware (May 10, 1960)

During April 28–29, Triton conducted engineering drills, then proceeded to Tenerife, the Canary Islands, arriving on April 30, and thereafter setting course for Cádiz, Spain, to complete two additional goals of Operation Sandblast. One was to honor the seaport where Ferdinand Magellan set sail in 1519 to initiate the first global maritime circumnavigation, and the other was to deliver a plaque created to honor Magellan's and Triton's historic voyages when Triton rendezvoused with the destroyer John W. Weeks off Cádiz on May 2, 1960. Afterward, Beach noted, "We are on the last leg of our trip enroute to the United States."

Triton returned to the United States, surfacing off the coast of Rehoboth Beach, Delaware, on May 10, 1960. Captain Beach was flown by helicopter (pictured) to Washington, D.C., where news of Triton's submerged around-the-world voyage was announced by President Dwight D. Eisenhower at the White House, with Vice Admiral Hyman G. Rickover, known as the "Father of the Nuclear Navy", in attendance. Beach flew back to his boat later that day, and Triton arrived back at Groton, Connecticut, on May 11, 1960, completing her shakedown cruise and the first submarine circumnavigation of the Earth.

== Mission accomplishments ==
Triton's globe-girdling cruise proved invaluable to the United States. Politically, it enhanced the nation's prestige. From an operational viewpoint, the cruise demonstrated the great submerged endurance and sustained high-speed transit capabilities of the first generation of nuclear-powered submarines. Moreover, during the voyage, the submarine collected reams of oceanographic data.

— Dictionary of American Naval Fighting Ships

=== Key facts and figures ===
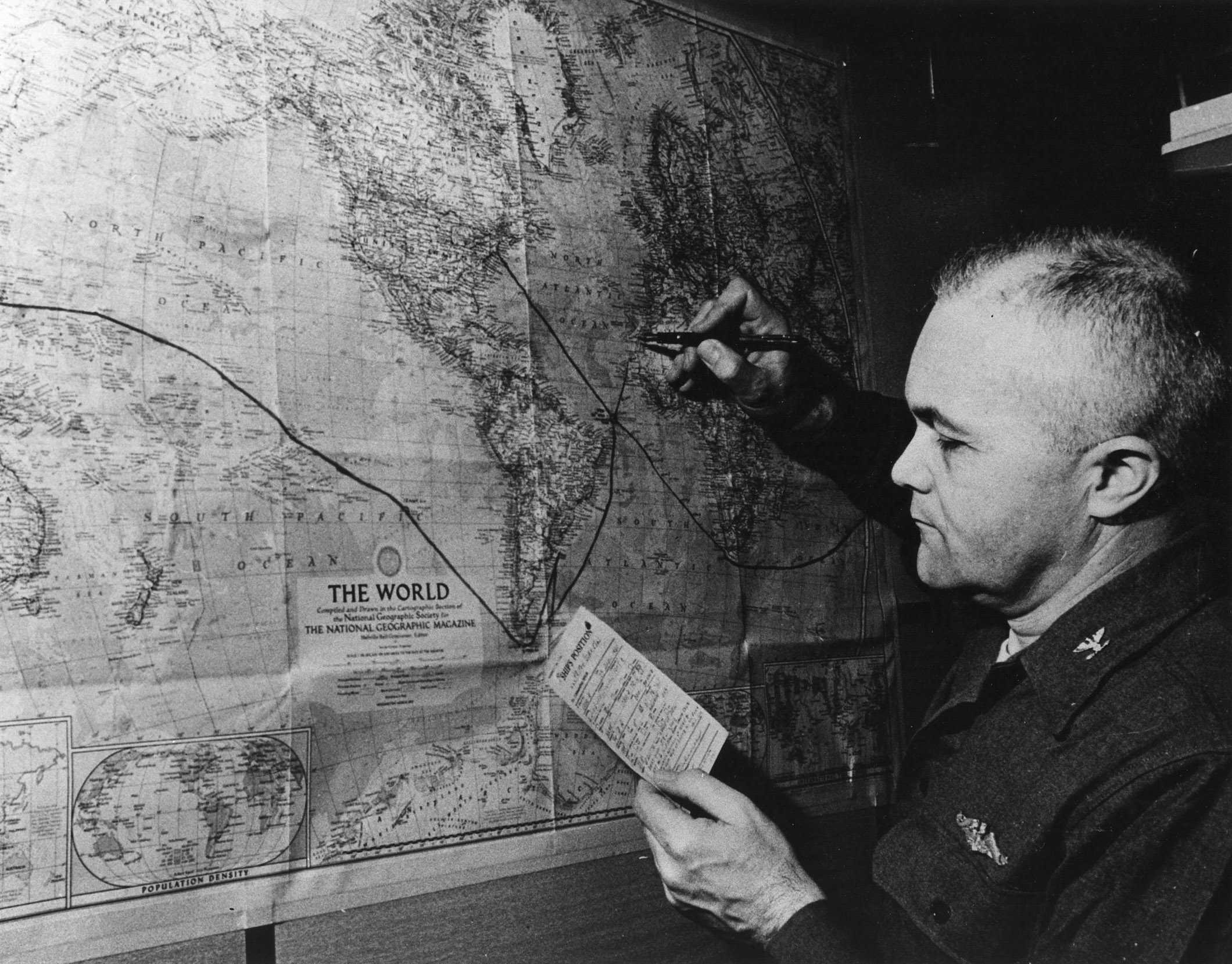
Captain Beach traces the route of Triton's submerged circumnavigation.

The total mileage and duration of the first submerged circumnavigation of the Earth are as follows:

- Nautical miles – 26,723 nautical miles (49,491 km; 30,752 mi)
- Dates – February 24 to April 25, 1960
- Duration – 60 days and 21 hours
- Average speed of advance (SOA) – 18 knots (33 km/h; 21 mph)

Triton also crossed the Equator four times during its circumnavigation on the following dates and locations:

- February 24, 1960 – near St. Peter and Paul Rocks, mid-Atlantic Ocean (longitude 29° 32.'8 West)
- March 19, 1960 – near Christmas Island, mid-Pacific Ocean (longitude 155° 54'.8 West)
- April 3, 1960 – Makassar Strait (longitude 119° 05'.1 East)
- April 25, 1960 – near St. Peter and Paul Rocks, mid-Atlantic Ocean (longitude 28° 03'.0 West)

On her shakedown cruise, Triton was submerged a total of 83 days 9 hours, covering 35,979.1 nautical miles (66,633.3 km; 41,404.0 mi). The total duration of the shakedown cruise was 84 days 19 hours 8 minutes, covering 36,335.1 nautical miles (67,292.6 km; 41,813.7 mi).

Guinness World Records lists Triton's submerged circumnavigation as 83 days, 9 hours, 54 minutes in duration, the total submerged portion of her shakedown cruise. When the British trimaran Cable & Wireless Adventurer completed its 74-day circumnavigation in 1998, Guinness World Records recorded this as the fastest motorized maritime circumnavigation, beating the previous record held by Triton. When interviewed by travel author Clive Tully, retired Captain Tom B. Thamm, Triton's diving officer during Operation Sandblast, confirmed the actual duration of Triton's submerged circumnavigation was 60 days, 21 hours while further noting:

The Cable & Wireless Adventurer did not beat Triton's record if it took them 75 days to circumnavigate the earth. And if their route was 4752 statute miles (7647.6 km) shorter than ours, they simply aren't even close.

When Tully made inquiries regarding inconsistencies pertaining to the fastest motorized maritime circumnavigation record, the Guinness World Records response was: "If the US Department of Defense would care to present us with all the facts, we'll look at it again." Tully noted that this information had been publicly available since the publication of Around the World Submerged: The Voyage of the Triton, Captain Beach's 1962 account of Operation Sandblast. Arguably, Triton's circumnavigation remains the fastest for a motorized sea vessel, beating Cable & Wireless Adventurer's 1998 74-day voyage and Earthrace's 2008 circumnavigation of 60 days, 23 hours, and 49 minutes.

=== Scientific and national security accomplishments ===
Operation Sandblast gathered extensive oceanographic, hydrographic, gravimetric, and geophysical data. Water samples were taken throughout Triton's circumnavigation, which were tested for differences in chemical composition, salinity, density, and temperature. Such samples were vital for submarine operations. Water salinity and density affects submerged trim, as well as sonar performance, while warmer water affects the efficiency of shipboard condensers and, consequently, ship speed. Measurements from the installed gravity meter provided a continuous record of variations in earth's gravity field throughout Triton's circumnavigation. This extensive gravity study assisted the Navy in developing navigational aids. Some 144 hydrographic bottles to track ocean currents were released during Operation Sandblast. Triton mapped uncharted seamounts, coral reefs, and other submerged topographic structures using its fathometer and sonar systems. These scientific data gathered during Operation Sandblast continued to be invaluable in providing information on oceanic changes, with Sydney Levitus, the director of NOAA's Ocean Climate Laboratory in Silver Spring, Maryland, characterizing Triton's data (pictured) as being "a very exciting set of observations."

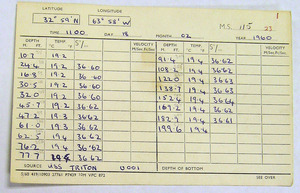
Ocean Data Sheet – February 18, 1960

Operation Sandblast also proved nuclear-powered submarines could undertake extended operations independent of any external support. Specifically, Triton tested a prototype ship inertial navigational system (SINS) for submarine use, as well as being the first submarine to test the floating very low frequency (VLF) communications buoy system, with both systems being vital for the Navy's upcoming Polaris fleet ballistic missile submarines (FBM) deterrence patrols. Finally, the psychological testing of Triton's crew members to determine the effects of long-term isolation was particularly relevant for the initial deployment of the Navy's fleet ballistic missile submarines, as well as NASA's upcoming crewed space program, Project Mercury, with MIT engineers assuring NASA "that getting to the moon and back was simpler than guiding an antiballistic missile or circumnavigating the earth under water in a nuclear submarine."

In his 2000 book Ships Of Discovery And Exploration, historian Lincoln P. Paine further summarized the true accomplishment of Operation Sandblast:

Although the voyage had been conceived as a way for Eisenhower to impress Soviet General Secretary Nikita Khrushchev at the Paris summit, this conference was canceled after U-2 pilot Francis Gary Powers was shot down over the Soviet Union on May 1. But coming less than two years after the transpolar expedition of the USS Nautilus, the Triton's accomplishment was a clear reaffirmation of U.S. technological supremacy.

== Mission aftermath ==
The first underwater circumnavigation of the globe is a triumph of human prowess and engineering skill, a feat which the United States Navy can rank as one of its bright victories in man's ultimate conquest of the seas.

— The New York Times (May 13, 1960)

=== Media coverage ===
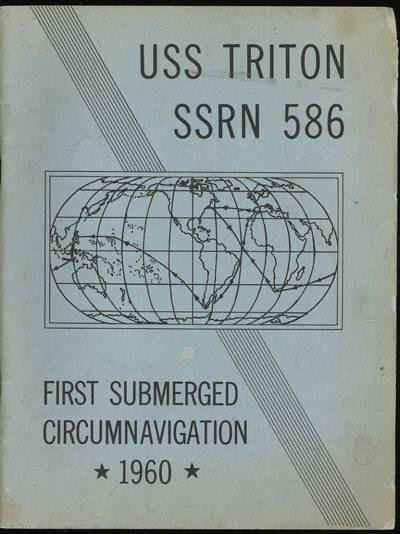
First Submerged Circumnavigation *1960* (GPO)

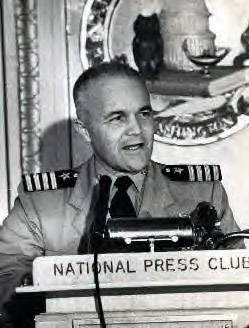
Captain Edward L. Beach

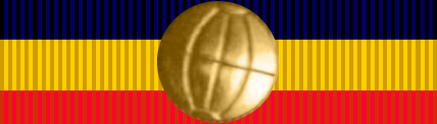
Presidential Unit Citation including the special clasp in the form of a golden replica of the globe of the world.

Because of the public uproar over the U-2 Incident, which sparked a major Soviet-American diplomatic crisis that led to the collapse of the 1960 Paris Summit, most of the official celebrations for Triton's circumnavigation were canceled. The voyage did receive extensive contemporary coverage by the news media, including feature magazine articles by Argosy, Life, Look, National Geographic, and the Saturday Evening Post as well as television and newsreels.

Captain Beach appeared on the CBS news program Face the Nation on May 15, 1960; several Triton crew members appeared on the What's My Line television game show. The circumnavigation was the subject of the ABC television series Expedition! broadcast on February 14, 1961. Hosted by John D. Craig, this episode was titled Saga of the Triton, and it featured film footage from Operation Sandblast with voice-over narration extracted from Captain Beach's logbook.

The American government published an 82-page redacted version of Triton's log after the circumnavigation. It was described by The New York Times as "a literary product in its own right [that] rivals in spots the suspense and drama of an adventure from the pages of Captain Hornblower."

Captain Beach wrote the lead article ("Triton Follows Magellan's Wake") on the circumnavigation for the November 1960 issue of National Geographic Magazine; later, he wrote a book-length account, Around the World Submerged: The Voyage of the Triton, which was published in 1962. Beach also made public presentations about Operation Sandblast before the National Press Club; National Geographic Society on May 27, 1960; the American Philosophical Society on April 22, 1961; the Society of Non-Destructive Testing on May 8, 1965; and the Eagle-Scout Recognition Dinner in Chicago, Illinois, on November 4, 1965.

Historian Bern Dibner wrote Victoria and the Triton, a 1964 book about famous maritime circumnavigations, featuring the Victoria, the Spanish carrack that was the first ship to circumnavigate the world under Juan Sebastián Elcano, as well as Triton's submerged circumnavigation of 1960. Also, Beril Becker wrote a 1961 juvenile-market non-fiction account of Operation Sandblast, Around the World Underwater: Captain Edward L. Beach, with illustrations by Richard Modock. Finally, the circumnavigation was recognized as a scientific and technological achievement for the year 1960 in Bernard Grun's historical reference, The Timetables of History. Operation Sandblast is also examined within the overall context of global circumnavigations in Joyce E. Chaplin's 2012 history Round About the Earth: Circumnavigation from Magellan to Orbit.

For the 50th anniversary of Operation Sandblast, writer-historian Carl LaVO wrote "Incredible Voyage" for the June 2010 edition of Naval History magazine. Captain Beach's nephew, John Beach wrote "The First Submerged Circumnavigation" for the April 2010 issue of The Submarine Review, the magazine of the Naval Submarine League. In a 1999 interview for All Hands magazine, Captain Beach paid tribute to his crew and their ship:

I'm proud of Triton's around-the-world cruise, but I didn't really do that. That was done by my crew and the Navy – the ship the Navy built and put me in command of. That's not a personal achievement, although I was captain of the ship.

In 2010, Naval Institute Press published Beneath the Waves by Dr. Edward F. Finch, a biography of the late Captain Beach, which includes extensive coverage of Operation Sandblast.

=== Public recognition ===
On May 10, 1960, Triton received the Presidential Unit Citation from Secretary of the Navy William B. Franke, It was accepted by Chief Torpedoman's Mate Chester Raymond Fitzjarald, the Chief of the Boat, on behalf of Triton's officers and crew. The citation reads:

For meritorious achievement from 16 February 1960 to 10 May 1960. During this period the TRITON circumnavigated the earth submerged, generally following the route of Magellan's historic voyage. In addition to proving the ability of both crew and nuclear submarine to accomplish a mission which required almost three months of submergence, TRITON collected much data of scientific importance. The performance, determination and devotion to duty of the TRITON's crew were in keeping with the highest traditions of the naval service. All members of the crew who made this voyage are authorized to wear the Presidential Unit Citation ribbon with a special clasp in the form of a golden replica of the globe.

Triton was just the second Navy vessel to receive the PUC for a peacetime mission, after the nuclear submarine USS Nautilus (SSN-571) received it for its 1958 voyage under the North Pole (Operation Sunshine). All Triton personnel who made that voyage were authorized to wear their Presidential Unit Citation ribbon with a special clasp in the form of a golden replica of the globe (pictured).

Captain Beach received the Legion of Merit from President Eisenhower in a ceremony held in the Conference Room at the White House on May 10, 1960. Presidential naval aide Captain Evan P. Aurand read the citation:

For exceptionally meritorious conduct in the performance of outstanding service while serving on board the U.S.S. TRITON from 16 February 1960 to 10 May 1960. As Commanding Officer, Captain Edward L. Beach, United States Navy, led his crew with courage, foresight and determination in an unprecedented circumnavigation of the globe, proving man's ability under trying conditions to accomplish prolonged submerged missions as well as testing new and complex equipment in the world's largest submarine. This historic voyage took his ship into strange waters under difficult and frequently unknown conditions, as a result, the TRITON collected much valuable oceanographic information. Captain Beach's sound judgment, masterful leadership, professional skill and devotion to duty were in keeping with the highest traditions of the naval service.

Beach received the 1960 Giant of Adventure Award from Argosy magazine, which dubbed him the "Magellan of the Deep". Beach also received an honorary doctorate of science (Sc.D) from the American International College, whose citation reads:

Your most recent exploit in commanding the largest submarine in existence during an historic submerged voyage around the globe has won for you and your crew the admiration of the world you circled.

In 1961, the American Philosophical Society presented Beach with its Magellanic Premium, the nation's oldest and most prestigious scientific award, in "recognition of his navigation of the U.S. submarine Triton around the globe."

In 2011, Operation Sandblast, the USS Triton, and Captain Edward L. Beach, Jr., were included in the Technology for the Nuclear Age: Nuclear Propulsion display for the Cold War exhibit at the U.S. Navy Museum in Washington, DC.

=== Promotions and qualifications ===
On April 11, 1960, the chief petty officers Hugh M. Bennett, Jr.; Joseph H. Blair, Jr.; Harry W. Hampson; Herbert F. Hardman; and Lynn S. Loveland were announced for promotion to ensign and moved into the ward room. Also on that date, the first-class petty officers George M. Bloomingdale; Richard R. Fickel; Joseph R. Flasco; Gene R. Hoke; Lonard F. Lehman; George W. Mather; J. C. Meaders; Russell F. Pion; Gerald R. Stott; and Robert R. Tambling were promoted to Chief Petty Officers and moved in the Chiefs' Quarters.

Executive Officer Will Mont Adams, Jr., received notice of his promotion to full Commander on April 30, 1960, his birthday, effective February 1, 1960. Also on that date, Chief Engineering Officer Donald Gene Fears was promoted to Lieutenant Commander, effective February 1, 1960.

On May 10, 1960, William R. Hadley, Chief Communications Technician, was awarded his silver dolphin pin, signifying that he was qualified to serve on submarines. Also on that date, enlisted men Lawrence W. Beckhaus; Fred Kenst; William A. McKamey; and James H. Smith, Jr., were awarded their silver dolphin pins.

== Mission legacy ==
The epochal achievement of the fleet of Magellan in circumnavigating the globe was echoed in the magnificent accomplishment by the nuclear submarine Triton in 1960. Like the voyage of Magellan, that of the Triton created stirring philosophical concepts. It demonstrated that a company of men could live and work in the depth of the ocean for months at a time. It was shown that thru the new technology a source of power had been made in such abundance and so manageable that, without refueling, an 8000-ton vehicle would be driven thru the water around the world. It was also shown that the arts of observation, navigation, communication and control had reached the point where travel under the water was possible with pinpoint accuracy.

— Bern Dibner (1964)

=== Triton Plaque ===
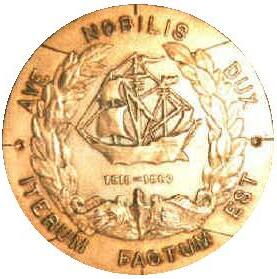
The Triton Plaque

In the eight days before Triton's departure on her around-the-world submerged voyage, Captain Beach approached Lt. Tom B. Thamm, Triton's Auxiliary Division Officer, to design a commemorative plaque for their upcoming voyage, as well as the first circumnavigation led by Portuguese explorer Ferdinand Magellan. The plaque's eventual design consisted of a brass disk about 23 inches (58 cm) in diameter, bearing a sailing ship reminiscent of Magellan's carrack, Trinidad, above the submarine dolphin insignia with the years 1519 and 1960 between them, all within a laurel wreath. Outside the wreath is the motto AVE NOBILIS DUX, ITERUM FACTUM EST ("Hail Noble Captain, It Is Done Again").

Commodore Tom Henry, commanding Submarine Squadron 10, supervised the completion of the plaque. The carving of the wooden form was done by retired Chief Electrician's Mate Ernest L. Benson at New London. The actual molding of the plaque was done by the Mystic Foundry.

During the homeward leg of her around-the-world voyage, Triton rendezvoused with the destroyer John W. Weeks on May 2, 1960, off Cádiz, Spain, the departure point for Magellan's earlier voyage. Triton broached, and Weeks transferred the finished plaque to Triton for transport back to the United States. The plaque was subsequently presented to the Spanish government by John Davis Lodge, the United States Ambassador to Spain. This plaque is located at the City Hall in Sanlúcar de Barrameda, Spain, and it is mounted on the wall of the city hall with a marble slab memorializing the circumnavigation.

Duplicates of the Triton Plaque were presented to the Mystic Seaport Museum in Mystic, Connecticut; the Naval Historical Association in Washington, D.C.; and the U.S. Navy Submarine School and the U.S. Navy Submarine Force Library and Museum, in Groton, Connecticut.

=== Triton memorials ===
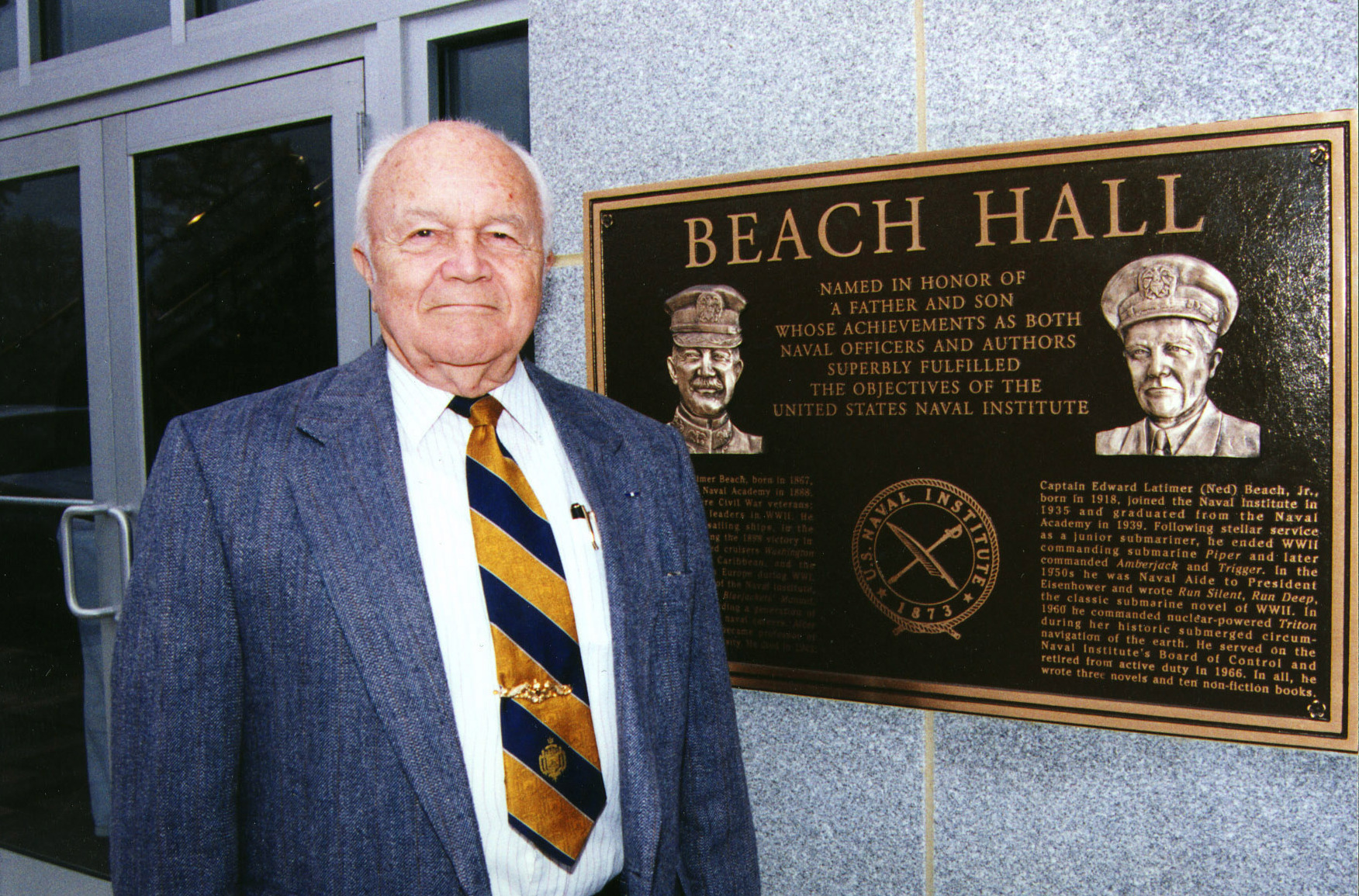
Captain Edward L. Beach at the dedication of Beach Hall (1999)

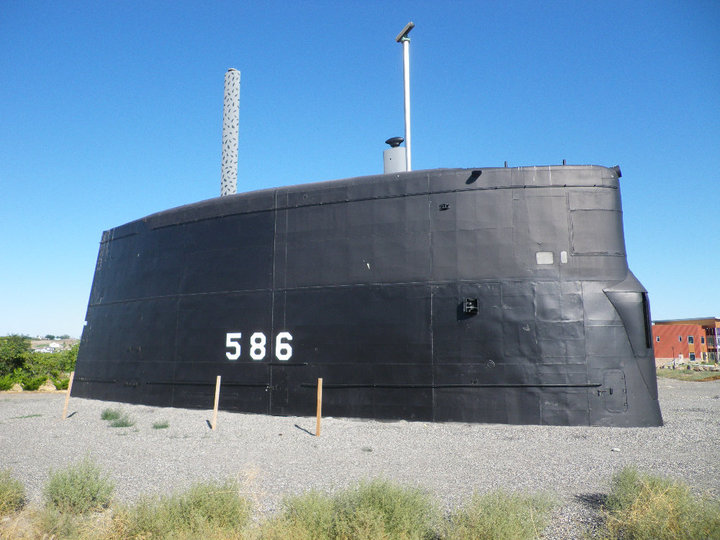
USS Triton Submarine Memorial Park

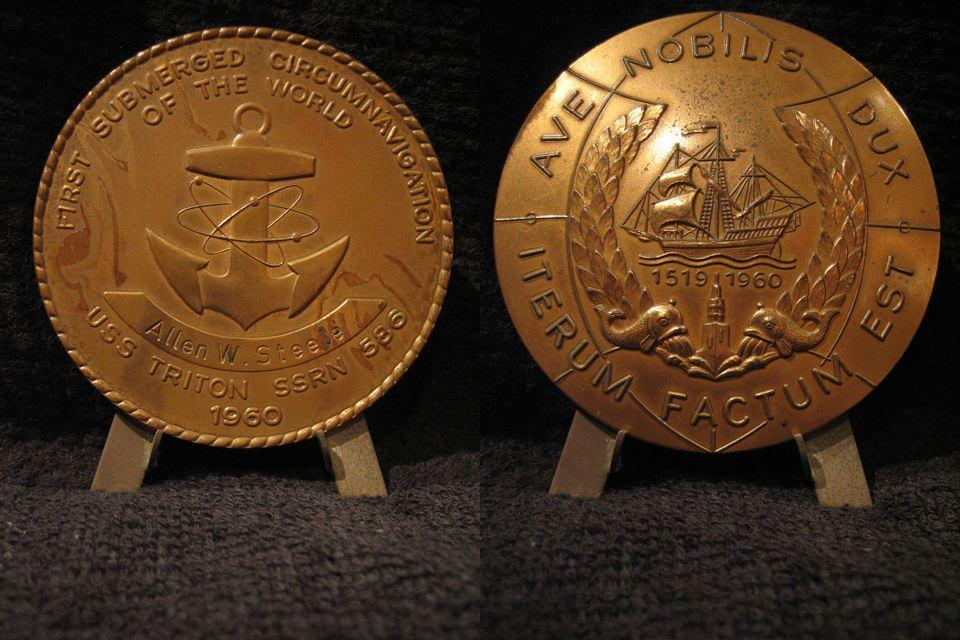
Triton Medal, presented to each member of the Circumnavigation Crew by Captain Edward L. Beach

Triton Light is a navigational beacon on the seawall of the United States Naval Academy (USNA) in Annapolis, Maryland, where the Severn River meets Spa Creek and the Annapolis harbor. It was donated to the Academy and named for the Greek god by the United States Naval Academy Class of 1945. The crew of Triton provided samples of water taken from the 22 seas through which their ship had passed during their submerged 1960 circumnavigation, which were used to fill a globe built into the Triton Light along with a commemorative marker.

Beach Hall is the headquarters of the United States Naval Institute. Dedicated on April 21, 1999, the building is named for Beach and his father, Captain Edward L. Beach, Sr., who served as the Institute's secretary-treasurer. The dive wheel from Triton's conning tower is on display in the lobby.

Triton was the 2003 inductee into the Submarine Hall of Fame in recognition of executing the first submerged circumnavigation, following her nomination by the Tidewater chapter and Hampton Roads Base of the United States Submarine Veterans, Inc. (USSVI). A shadow box filled with Triton memorabilia was placed in Alcorn Auditorium of Ramage Hall at the U.S. Navy Submarine Learning Center, Naval Station Norfolk.

The USS Triton Submarine Memorial Park is located along the Columbia River in Washington state. Its purpose is "to establish a permanent park in north Richland in recognition of all the decommissioned reactor cores off-loaded at the Port of Benton's barge slip, transported and stored at the Hanford Site." The park features Triton's sail superstructure (pictured) and eventually an information display on the history of Triton. The park also serves as a tourist attraction, especially due to its location, since Hanford is the resting place of spent reactor cores from several Navy ships. The park's tentative location is at the end of Port of Benton Boulevard in north Richland, Washington. Planning called for Triton's sail to be cut up for transport and re-assembly at the park site. Ground-breaking was initially scheduled to take place on April 3, 2008, with the dedication ceremony set for August 19, 2008 and a fall 2009 start date for construction. On October 23, 2009, the Port of Benton encased Triton's conning tower in concrete at its new USS Triton Submarine Memorial Park in north Richland, Washington. In mid-December 2009, the final pieces of Triton's sail were welded together at the park's site. During the August 11, 2010 port commission meeting, it was reported that bids for the first phase, which includes the park's electrical lighting system and the pouring the concrete around Triton's sail, would be announced shortly by the port authority. The second phase would involve the park's landscaping, and the third phase would be the installation of a parking lot. The park is part of the Richland Riverfront Trail, a marked hiking trail that focuses on the state of Washington's contribution to the nuclear history of the United States, and it connects to the Sacagawea Heritage Trail. The USS Triton Submarine Memorial Park is located off George Washington Way near the Columbia River, and it was formally dedicated on November 10, 2011, the 52nd anniversary of the commissioning of the USS Triton.

=== Cultural references ===
Two films of the period, Voyage to the Bottom of the Sea and Around the World Under the Sea, dramatized globe-circling submerged voyages similar to Operation Sandblast. The 1960 comedy album, The Button-Down Mind of Bob Newhart, included a sketch entitled "The Cruise of the U.S.S. Codfish" which was a monologue involving the final address by the captain to the crew of a nuclear-powered submarine after completing a two-year-long, around-the-world underwater voyage. Bob Newhart noted in a 2006 interview that:

You know, I think the Triton kind of, I think was a spur for that routine as I think back. Because I then imagined what a trip like that would have been like with a totally incompetent commander, and the cruise of USS Codfish was the final result.

Captain Beach reportedly played "The Cruise of the U.S.S. Codfish" over the ship's public address system during Triton's first overseas deployment in the fall of 1960. Finally, Antigua-Barbuda issued a commemorative stamp of Triton's 1960 submerged circumnavigation.

=== 50th anniversary ===
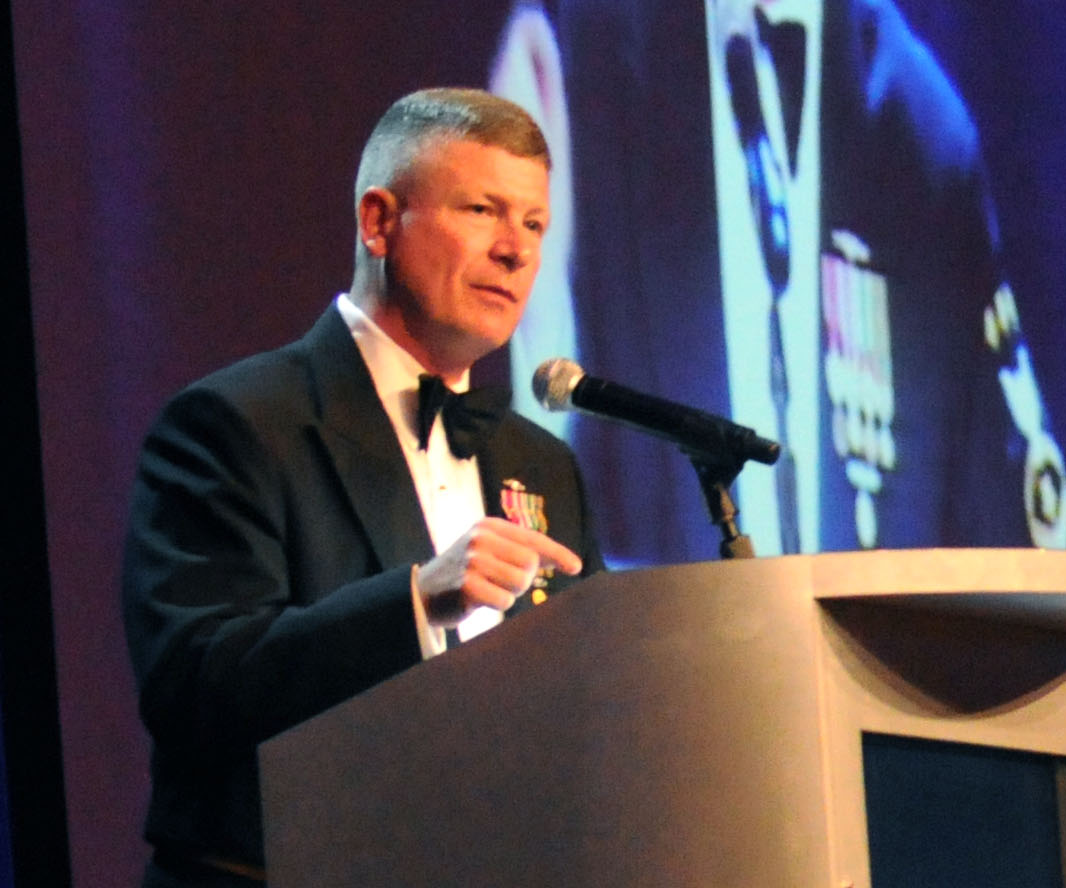
MCPON West at the 110th Submarine Ball (April 10, 2010)

The 50th anniversary of Operation Sandblast and Triton's submerged circumnavigation was celebrated on April 10, 2010, during the 2010 Submarine Birthday Ball held at the Foxwoods Resort Casino in Mashantuket, Connecticut, with Master Chief Petty Officer of the Navy (MCPON) Rick West delivering opening remarks (pictured) to the 2,200 attendees. The U.S. Navy Submarine Force Library and Museum sponsored additional events and activities, entitled "9,000 Leagues Under the Sea", between April 10–12 and April 14–18, 2010.

Also, on April 9, 2010, retired Admiral Henry G. Chiles Jr., who served in Triton from 1963 to 1966, was the keynote speaker at the graduation class of the Basic Enlisted Submarine School at the New London Naval Submarine Base in Groton, Connecticut. The graduation class was named in honor of Triton, and each graduate received a certificate of course completion and a commemorative coin celebrating the 50th anniversary of Triton's submerged circumnavigation. The Dolphin Scholarship Foundation used the 50th anniversary to promote its "Race Around the World" fund-raising program to support its Dolphin Scholarship program. Finally, former members of Triton's crew received commemorative souvenirs of the ship's pressure hull at their 2010 re-union.

On April 25, 2010, the University of Texas Marine Science Institute posted a radio program article on its Science and the Sea web site commemorating Operation Sandblast and USS Triton.

Writer-historian Carl LaVO wrote "Incredible Voyage" for the June 2010 edition of Naval History magazine, and John Beach wrote "The First Submerged Circumnavigation" for the April 2010 issue of The Submarine Review, the official magazine of the Naval Submarine League. Mr. Beach is the nephew of Captain Edward L. Beach, the commanding officer of USS Triton during Operation Sandblast. Also, the Naval Institute Press published Beneath the Waves by Dr. Edward F. Finch, a 2010 biography of the late Captain Beach, which included extensive coverage of Operation Sandblast.

The legacy of Operation Sandblast on its 50th anniversary was summarized by retired Captain James C. Hay, who had served on Triton during its historic submerged around-the-world voyage. On the editorial page of the April 2010 issue of The Submarine Review, the official magazine of the Naval Submarine League, Captain Hay noted:

It is truly a cruise which tested the crew's mettle and proved the skipper's tenacity. More than that, however, it again proved to all who cared to listen that the US Navy could go anywhere, at anytime, and do what ever was required. It's a good sea story about doing what had to be done. On the fiftieth anniversary of the First Submerged Circumnavigation it's a good thing to do to re-read about one of the forerunners of all we've done since.

== See also ==
- 1966 Soviet submarine global circumnavigation
- Great White Fleet
- Operation Sea Orbit

== Bibliography ==
=== Published sources ===
- Arkin, William M.; Handler, Joshua (June 1989). Neptune Paper No. 3: Naval Accidents 1945–1988 (PDF). Washington, DC: Greenpeace/Institute for Policy Studies. Archived from the original (PDF) on June 29, 2021.
- Beach, Edward L. (1962). Around the World Submerged: The Voyage of the Triton. New York: Holt, Rinehart and Winston. LCCN 62-18406.
- Chaplin, Joyce E. (2012). Around About the Earth: Circumnavigation from Magellan to Orbit (Hardcover). New York City: Simon & Schuster. ISBN 978-1-416-59619-6.
- Duncan, Francis (2001). Rickover: The Struggle for Excellence. Annapolis: Naval Institute Press. ISBN 978-1-55750-177-6.
- "Edward L. Beach Papers" (PDF). Dwight D. Eisenhower Presidential Library and Museum. 1953–1961. Archived from the original (PDF) on July 21, 2011.
- Finch, Edward F. (2010). Beneath the Waves: The Life and Navy of Capt. Edward L. Beach, Jr. Annapolis: Naval Institute Press. ISBN 978-1-59114-266-9. Archived from the original on July 13, 2010.
- Friedman, Norman (1994). U.S. Submarines since 1945: An Illustrated Design History. Annapolis: Naval Institute Press. ISBN 978-1-55750-260-5. Archived from the original on July 14, 2010.
- Largess, Robert P.; Horwitz, Harvey S. (1993). "USS Triton: The Ultimate Submersible". In Gardiner, Robert (ed.). Warship 1993. London: Conway Maritime Press. pp. 167–187. ISBN 978-0-85177-624-8. OCLC 30209229.
- Polmar, Norman & Moore, J.K. (2004). Cold War Submarines: The Design and Construction of U.S. and Soviet Submarines (Paperback). Washington, DC: Potomac Books, Inc. ISBN 978-1-57488-530-9.
- USS Triton SSRN-586: First Submerged Circumnavigation 1960. Washington, DC: US Government Printing Office. 1960. O–550280.
- Weybrew, Benjamin B. (1992). The ABC's of Stress: A Submarine Psychologist's Perspective. Westport: Praeger Publishers. ISBN 978-0-275-94233-5.

=== Multi-media sources ===
- "Beyond Magellan" (General Dynamics, 1960) – Running time – 30:00
  - NavyTV.org
  - Stories of Submariners & Their Boats
  - Periscope Films at Youtube.com
    - USS Triton: Beyond Magellan – Part 1 (9:00)
    - USS Triton: Beyond Magellan – Part 2 (9:53)
    - USS Triton: Beyond Magellan – Part 3 (7:48)
    - The Saga of the Triton 1961 Expedition TV program (24:49)
- "USS Triton Trails Magellan" (National Geographic Society, 1960) – Running time – 40:00
- "Triton Launched: Giant Submarine First with Twin Nuclear Engines" (21 August 1958) Universal Newsreel narrated by Ed Herlihy (1:35)
- "New Magellan: Triton Circles World Submerged" (12 May 1960) Universal Newsreel narrated by Ed Herlihy (1:11)
- I Remember #1603: Host Jim Peck interviews Capt. Will M. Adams, Jr., USN (ret.). – WMVS/WMVT – Milwaukee PBS PBS – December 16, 2009 (28:16)
- British Pathé:
  - Around the World with Triton – 1960 (02:06)
  - Tale of Two Ships – May 16, 1960 (01:51)
