= Colin Edwards (disambiguation) =

Colin Edwards (born 1974) is an American motorcycle racer.

Colin Edwards may also refer to:

- Colin Edwards (footballer) (1991–2013), Guyanese footballer
- Colin Edwards (journalist) (1924–1994), British journalist and documentarian

== See also ==
- Demarco (musician) (born 1982), born Collin Edwards, Jamaican recording artist
