= Abro =

Abro, ABRO or Åbro may refer to:

- Åbro, a beer in Sweden
- Abro, a Low German name of Abruka, Estonia
- ABRO gallery by Ada Balcácer (2008–2012), an art gallery in Miami, Florida
- Abro (serial) a 2015 Pakistani TV series

== People ==
- Abro Chelebi (died 1676), Ottoman-Armenian merchant and philanthrope
- Abro (surname)
- Abro (tribe), Pakistan

== Acronyms ==
- Animal Breeding Research Organisation (1947–1986), a research institute at the University of Edinburgh
- Army Base Repair Organisation (1993–2008), a British defence agency
- Army of Burma Reserve Organisation (1885–1948), a colonial-era local population component of the British Burma Army

== See also ==
- Abra (disambiguation)
- Abda (disambiguation)
- Aabroo (disambiguation)
