= Aabroo =

Aabroo may refer to:

- Aabroo (1943 film), a Bollywood film
- Aabroo (1968 film), a Hindi romantic crime drama film

== See also ==
- Abro (disambiguation)
