= Ben Abda =

Ben Abda is a surname. Notable people with the surname include:

- Amel Ben Abda, Tunisian mathematician and professor
- Mohammed Ben Abda, cyclist, winner of the 1959 and 1961 Tunisian National Road Championships
