= Abda of Dair-Koni =

Mar Abda of Dair-Koni
- Born: ca. 450 AD; Kynai
- Venerated in: Assyrian Church of the East; Ancient Church of the East

Abda of Dair-Koni Classical Syriac: ܡܪܝ ܥܒܕܐ, (also known as Rabban Mar Abda) was a priest and abbot of the Church of the East.

== Biography ==
He was born at Kynai also known as Qani (where the apostle Saint Mari was buried) of an immoral woman who exposed her child to the elements. He was subsequently educated by the Christian church and ordained a priest. He founded a monastery and a school at Dair Qoni. In this capacity, he served as the teacher of Mar Abba. After a career in which he successfully converted several Marcionites, he retired to Tella on the Serser River.

No feast day commemorating this saint has been found to have existed.

== Sources ==
- Holweck, F. G., "A Biographical Dictionary of the Saints". St. Louis, Missouri, US: B. Herder Book Co., 1924.
