= Goat locker =

Term in Navy jargon

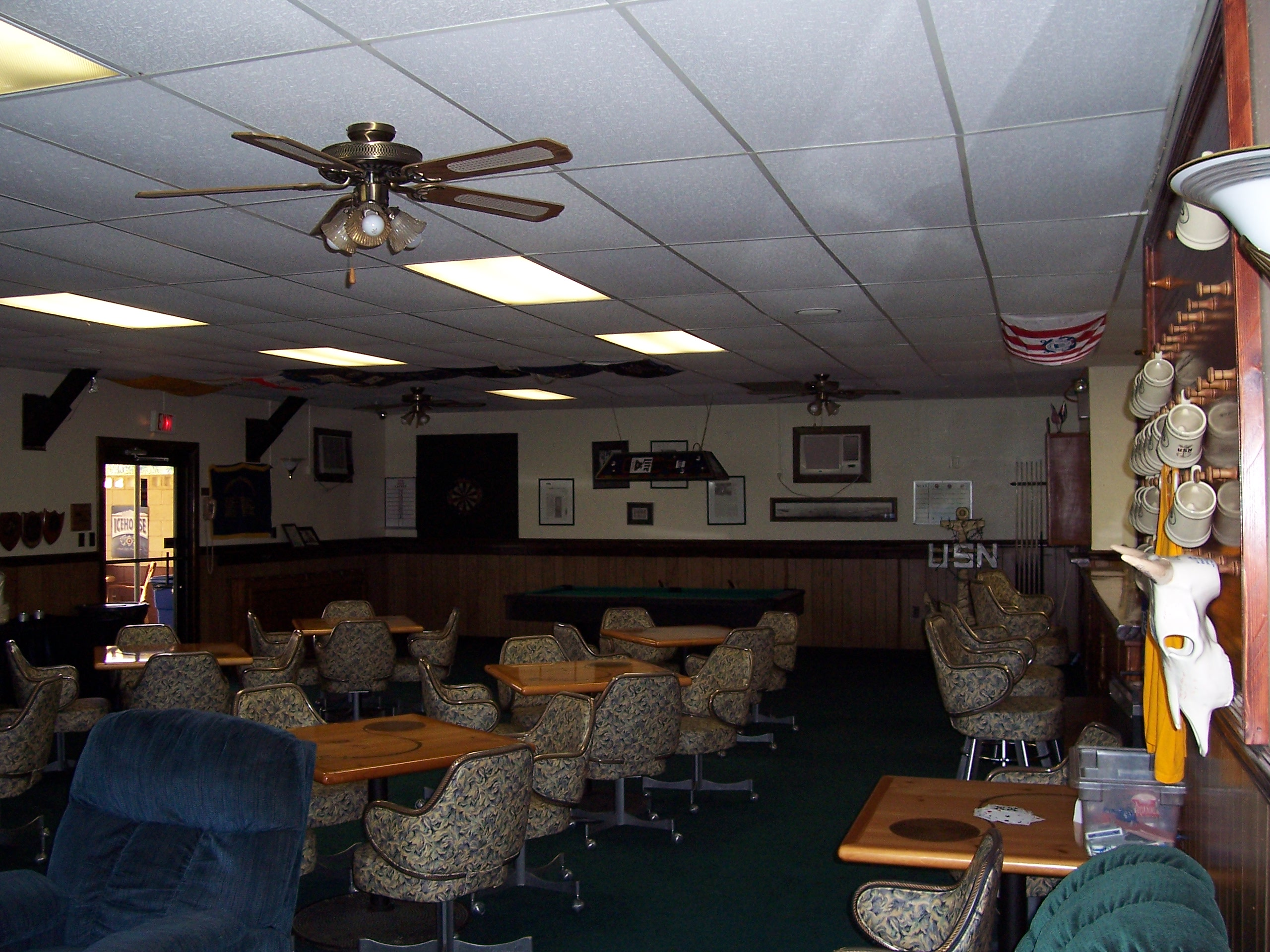
The goat locker at Guantanamo Bay Naval Base

In United States Navy jargon, the "goat locker" refers to the lounge, sleeping area and galley on board a naval vessel which is reserved for the exclusive use of chief petty officers. By tradition, all other personnel, including officers and even the commanding officer, must request permission to enter the goat locker.

== Etymology ==
The term goat locker takes its origins from wooden ship sailing times, when goats were kept aboard ship. The goat was used for its ability to consume nearly all forms of refuse, and produce milk for the crew. The quarters for the goat were traditionally in the Chief Petty Officer mess, which inherited the moniker "goat locker". In modern times, "goat locker" represents any gathering place, on- or off-ship, where Chief Petty Officers hold private functions.

== Special dinnerware ==
The United States Navy, in respect for the position of Chief Petty Officers, formerly provided dinnerware made specifically for the goat locker.

The special insignia (topmark) used on this china to denote the Chief Petty Officer's Mess were the letters "USN" beneath the US Navy's "Fouled, Fluked, and Stocked Anchor".

Official china was produced for the US Navy by manufacturers such as Tepco, Shenango, Buffalo, Sterling and Homer Laughlin from the early 1930s through World War II, and was used until the 1960s when inventories were consumed. This Navy china made for the Chief Petty Officer's "Goat Locker" is rare, as it is typically kept as an heirloom passed down through generations.
