= Abd al-Masih (martyr) =

Christian martyr

Saint Asher ben Levi Abd al-Masih

Martyr
- Born: אשר בן לוי (Asher ben Levi); Sinjar (Likely)
- Died: 390 AD; Sinjar (Likely)
- Venerated in: Oriental Orthodox Church
- Beatified: Pre-Congregation, Syria by Syriac Orthodox Church
- Canonized: Pre-Congregation, Syria by Syriac Orthodox Church Armenian Apostolic Church
- Feast: October 3
- Patronage: Barren women

Abd al-Masih, born Asher ben Levi (Hebrew: אשר בן לוי, Syriac: ܥܒܕܐܠܡܣܝܚ, Arabic: عبد المسيح), is described as a saint and martyr in early Christianity. The name Abd al-Masih (عبد المسيح) means "servant/slave of the Messiah" in Arabic.

Abd al-Masih was a Jewish shepherd boy in Sasanian Mesopotamia who was killed by his father, Levi, for converting to Christianity. Having converted, he pierced his ear to wear an earring, probably an indication of his metaphorical slavery to Jesus. He died in AD 390. The story is set in Singara and is a Syriac text with later versions in Arabic and Armenian.

There is disagreement about the location of his martyrdom. Some sources say Singar (in modern Iraq near the Syrian border), and others say Taglibis in Arabia. He is regarded as the patron saint of sterile women in Syria, and has his feast day observed on July 13, and July 22 or October 3.

After his martyrdom, his then-elderly father grew troubled and unwell, and after being taken to the place where his son died; he ended up converting to Christianity with his family.

== Sources ==
Fiey, Jean Maurice (2004). Lawrence I. Conrad (ed.). Saints Syriaques, volume 6. Princeton, N.J.: The Darwin Press, Inc.
