= Speed of advance =

Speed of advance (SOA) is used to indicate the speed to be made along the intended track. The intended (anticipated, desired) speed along the track with respect to the earth, taking into consideration the effect of known or predicted current; speed along the track. SOA is also used to designate the average speed that must be made good to arrive at a destination at a specified time.
