= Triton Light =

Navigational beacon at the United States Naval Academy

- Location: US Naval Academy, Annapolis, Maryland
- Coordinates: 38°58′54″N 76°28′36″W

Tower
- Constructed: 1959
- Height: 25 feet (7.6 m)

Light
- First lit: 1959
- Focal height: 7.5 m (25 ft)
- Characteristic: Fl (4+5) G 30s 0.3s fl 1.3s ec. 0.3s fl 1.3s ec. 0.3s fl 1.3s ec. 0.3s fl 3.4s ec. 0.3s fl 1.3s ec. 0.3s fl 1.3s ec. 0.3s fl 1.3s ec. 0.3s fl 1.3s ec. 0.3s fl 14.8s ec.

The Triton Light is a navigational beacon on the seawall of the United States Naval Academy in Annapolis, Maryland, where the Severn River meets Spa Creek and the Annapolis harbor. It was donated to the Academy and named for the Greek god by the Class of 1945. It is not only an important part of the culture and traditions of the Naval Academy, but also is a trusted navigational point in Annapolis Harbor (e.g., 33 CFR 110.159).

About a year after the light was installed, USS Triton (SSRN-586) completed her historic submerged circumnavigation. Considering the coincidence of names, the crew of Triton provided samples of water from the 22 seas through which their boat had passed, which were used to fill a globe built into the light.

The characteristics of this light are FL (4+5) G 30s, that is Flashing Green light 4x, then 5x, every 30 seconds. The characteristics of the odd number sequence is unique, an honor to commemorate the Class of 1945.

The seawall on the Severn River from Triton Light north-west to the end of Simms Rd at College Creek is exactly 1/2 nautical mile, thus it is frequently used to calibrate speed instruments on boats.
