= Abda of Edessa =

Saint Abda of Edessa

Bishop of Edessa
- Venerated in: Syriac Orthodox Church
- Feast: 16 February

Abda was bishop of Edessa. He is commemorated as a saint by the Syriac Orthodox Church in the Martyrology of Rabban Sliba, and his feast day is 16 February. The French scholar Jean Maurice Fiey notes there are two bishops of Edessa of the same name listed by Michael the Syrian's Chronicle, of whom neither have any notable actions or precise dates with which to identify them by.

== Bibliography ==
- Chabot, Jean-Baptiste, ed. (1905). Chronique de Michel le Syrien. Vol. III. Paris: Ernest Leroux.
- Fiey, Jean Maurice (2004). Lawrence Conrad (ed.). Saints Syriaques. The Darwin Press.
