= Colin Edwards (footballer) =

Guyanese footballer

Personal information
- Date of birth: 5 May 1991
- Place of birth: Georgetown, Guyana
- Date of death: 16 February 2013 (aged 21)
- Height: 1.85 m (6 ft 1 in)
- Position: Goalkeeper

Senior career*
Years	Team	Apps	(Gls)
2008–2011	Fruta Conquerors		
2012–2013	Caledonia AIA	0	(0)

International career
2012	Guyana	3	(0)
- * Club domestic league appearances and goals

Colin Edwards (5 May 1991 – 16 February 2013) was a Guyanese international football player. He played in three friendly games for the Guyana national football team.

On 5 February 2013, Edwards was involved in a motorcycle accident in Georgetown. He remained unconscious until he died on 16 February 2013 in the Intensive Care Unit (ICU) of the Georgetown Public Hospital.

== International appearances ==
Date	Opponent	Competition	Score-line
22 March 2012	French Guiana	Friendly	2-0
4 May 2012	Guadeloupe	Friendly	2-1
20 May 2012	Panama	Friendly	0-2
