= Edward Beach =

Edward Beach may refer to:

- Ed Beach (1929–1996), American basketball player
- Edward L. Beach Sr. (1867–1943), U.S. Navy officer, author, and educator
- Edward L. Beach Jr. (1918–2002), U.S. Navy submarine officer and author
- Eddie Beach (born 2003), Welsh association footballer
