= Run Silent, Run Deep (film) =

1958 film by Robert Wise

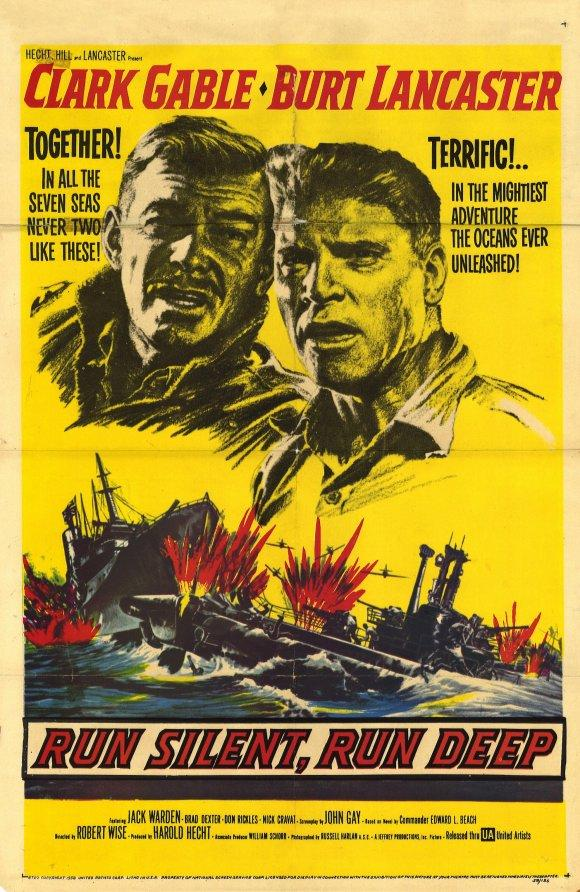
- Theatrical release poster by Reynold Brown
- Directed by: Robert Wise
- Screenplay by: John Gay
- Based on: Run Silent, Run Deep by Edward L. Beach, Jr.
- Produced by: Harold Hecht
- Starring: Clark Gable; Burt Lancaster; Jack Warden; Don Rickles
- Cinematography: Russell Harlan
- Edited by: George Boemler
- Music by: Franz Waxman
- Production companies: Hecht-Hill-Lancaster Productions; Jeffrey Productions
- Distributed by: United Artists
- Release date: March 27, 1958
- Running time: 93 minutes
- Country: United States
- Language: English
- Box office: $2.5 million

Run Silent, Run Deep is a 1958 American black-and-white war film starring Clark Gable and Burt Lancaster, based on the 1955 novel of the same name by Commander (later Captain) Edward L. Beach Jr. The picture was directed by Robert Wise and produced by Harold Hecht. The title refers to "silent running", a submarine stealth tactic. The story describes World War II submarine warfare in the Pacific Ocean, and deals with themes of vengeance, endurance, courage, loyalty, and honor, and how these can be tested during wartime.

In addition to Gable and Lancaster playing the leads, the film also features Jack Warden, and was the film debut of Don Rickles.

United Artists promoted Run Silent, Run Deep as a combination of the obsessiveness of Moby-Dick's Captain Ahab and the shipboard rivalry found in Mutiny on the Bounty.

Although based on a novel of the same name, and having many of the same characters, the plot of the film diverges from that of the book. Captain Beach, the author of the book, did not think highly of the film; he later said that the film company bought only the book title and was not interested in producing an accurate depiction of the theme and plot of his novel.

Considering the star names involved, the film's box-office reception was disappointing.

== Plot ==
A World War II US Navy submarine officer, Commander P.J. Richardson, is determined to get revenge on the Japanese destroyer Akikaze and its captain, nicknamed "Bungo Pete," who has sunk four U.S. submarines in the Bungo Straits, including his previous command. He persuades the Navy Board to give him a new submarine command with the provision that his executive officer be someone who has just returned from active sea patrol.

He single-mindedly trains the crew of his new boat, the USS Nerka, to return to the Bungo Straits and sink Bungo Pete, in spite of the Navy having expressly forbidden him from entering the Bungo Straits on this mission. Richardson's executive officer, Lieutenant Jim Bledsoe, resents Richardson and the Navy leadership for denying him command of the Nerka, and worries about the safety of his boat and his crew.

Richardson rigorously drills the crew on a rapid bow shot. Firing at the bow of an approaching ship is considered an act of desperation due to a vessel's extremely narrow profile. He bypasses one target, then takes on a Japanese destroyer with a bow shot. The crew figures out that Richardson is avoiding legitimate targets to enter the Bungo Straits undetected in direct violation of his mission orders.

They encounter a large Japanese convoy. After blowing up a cargo ship and engaging Bungo Pete, they are attacked by aircraft that had clearly been alerted to their presence and were waiting in ambush. They rapidly dive and barely survive depth charges. Three of the crew are killed, and Richardson suffers an incapacitating concussion. The submarine narrowly dodges what the crew mistakenly believes is one of their own torpedoes doubling back on them. By sending up blankets, equipment and the bodies of the dead, they convince the Japanese that the submarine has been sunk. Bledsoe uses Richardson's injury to assume command and set course for Pearl Harbor.

While listening to Tokyo Rose proclaiming the sinking of their boat, several crewmen are mystified about how the Japanese are able to identify several of them by name. Bledsoe realizes that the Japanese have analyzed their floating trash. Since the Japanese believe the Nerka has been sunk, he returns to the Bungo Straits to fight the Akikaze, which the submarine sinks with a bow shot, only to be attacked again by a mystery torpedo. Richardson deduces that the Akikaze was not working alone to sink US submarines but was in concert with a Japanese submarine. He orders the boat into a dive just seconds before a Japanese torpedo races by.

After a brief underwater standoff, Bledsoe realizes that with the Akikaze gone, the Japanese sub must defend its convoy. By attacking the convoy, the Nerka forces its adversary to surface, where it uses the shallow-draft decoy ship as a screen. The Nerka fires torpedoes under the shallow-draft ship, destroying the Japanese sub hiding behind it.

Richardson collapses on the bridge, dies, and is buried at sea.

== Cast ==
- Clark Gable as Commander P.J. "Rich" Richardson
- Burt Lancaster as Lieutenant Jim Bledsoe
- Jack Warden as Yeoman 1st Class "Kraut" Mueller
- Brad Dexter as Ensign Gerald Cartwright
- Don Rickles as Quartermaster 1st Class Ruby
- Nick Cravat as Russo
- Joe Maross as Chief Petty Officer Kohler
- Mary LaRoche as Laura Richardson
- Eddie Foy III as Larto
- Rudy Bond as Sonarman 1st Class Cullen
- H.M. Wynant as Corpsman Hendrix
- John Gibson as Capt. Blunt
- Joel Fluellen as Bragg (uncredited)
- Teru Shimada as Japanese Submarine Commander (uncredited)

== Differences with the novel ==
The film draws many plot elements from the novel, including Japanese gathering intelligence from the submarine's trash. One key difference is that the novel places Richardson ashore recovering from a battle injury and working on the torpedo exploder problem when Bledsoe takes out Richardson's boat and dies in the sinking of the USS Walrus.

In the novel, the conflict between Richardson and Bledsoe begins at the start of the war, while they are reconditioning the old USS S-16 (SS-121) in the Naval Submarine Base New London and Richardson is compelled to disqualify Bledsoe for command of his own sub. The mutinous attitudes of the crew are an extension of Bledsoe's earlier rebelliousness, while the film provides them with no comparable context other than their loyalty to and respect for Bledsoe. Ensign Keith Leone, a sympathetic and loyal major character of the novel, is replaced by an unsympathetic and disloyal one who did not appear in the novel, Cartwright, to advance the conflict.

At Gable's insistence, the film has Richardson taken seriously ill before being relieved of command, so Gable would not be perceived as playing a less-than-dominant character.

In the film, the submarine does not ram Japanese lifeboats to ensure that Bungo Pete is killed. The US Navy, which helped with the film's production, may have been concerned with reviving memories of a 1943 incident in which Dudley W. Morton fired on Japanese shipwreck survivors while commanding USS Wahoo (SS-238).

== Production ==
=== Casting ===
Nick Cravat, who starred with Lancaster in nine films, had a speaking part. This was rare for him because his thick Brooklyn accent did not fit the historical dramas in which he often appeared.

Don Rickles made his film debut in a small role, and in his 2007 memoirs, he recalled that during filming, Gable sometimes frustrated the filmmakers (including Lancaster, who was a financial investor in the film) by adhering to a strict 9-to-5 approach to the workday — he reportedly stopped working during the filming of major scenes. Later in his life, Lancaster publicly had nothing but praise and admiration for Gable, whom he described as a consummate professional.

Albert Salmi was originally chosen to play Mueller, but left the film. He was replaced by Jack Warden.

Frank Gorshin drove from Pittsburgh to Los Angeles to audition for the role that went to Don Rickles. He fell asleep at the wheel and nearly died in the crash, fracturing his skull and spending four days in a coma.

=== Filming ===
The USS Redfish was used in many of the exterior scenes. This submarine had earlier portrayed the Nautilus in the Walt Disney film 20,000 Leagues Under the Sea (1954) and made several appearances in the television series The Silent Service. She was scrapped in 1969. Rear Admiral Rob Roy McGregor, who had commanded two fleet boats (Grouper and Sea Cat) during World War II, acted as the technical advisor.

The fictional Akikaze was portrayed by USS Kidd in several close-up and exterior scenes, as well as by a ship model in a water tank. The actual Japanese destroyer Akikaze was lost with all hands while shielding the Japanese carrier Junyo from torpedoes launched by the submarine USS Pintado (SS-387) on November 1, 1944. She was stricken from the Navy list on January 10, 1945. The real USS Nerka (SS-380) was under construction during World War II, but construction was cancelled in July 1944.

The film contains several accurate depictions of torpedo attacks being arranged with periscope sightings, range and bearing calculations, and use of a torpedo data computer to achieve a shooting solution. On the surface, the captain uses a target bearing transmitter mounted on the bridge to acquire a target visually and mark its bearing input for the shooting party inside the conning tower. This depicted the preferred tactic of night surface attack, taking advantage of both the submarine's greater speed and maneuverability using its diesel engines, and the use of its SJ radar in making accurate range and bearing calculations, although with greater risk of being sunk by bombs and shell fire.

Director Robert Wise had real submariners working with the cast until they could realistically depict the complexities of these torpedo attacks. Submarine veterans of World War II who viewed the film remarked on the accuracy of these scenes and the scenes now provide modern-day audiences with a view of what life was like aboard World War II submarines.

The special effects were completed using miniatures, considered to be state-of-the-art in 1957, when the film was made.

The US Navy and the production company staged a premiere for several journalists onboard the USS Perch, while she was "seven miles off Long Beach and 60 feet down".

== Reception ==
Bosley Crowther, writing in The New York Times, called Run Silent, Run Deep "a straight tale of undersea adventure, all-male and all-submarine ... [that] has the hard, cold ring of truth", with "dangerous adventures [that] are severely, nail-bitingly tense" until "the ultimate showdown ... that keeps one forward on the chair." To the extent that the events depicted might appear hard to believe, he cited the credentials of the novel's author and noted, "they look more like the real thing in good old black-and-white."

One critic later summarized the plot after it had been replicated in other submarine films:

[T]he Executive Officer hates the Skipper and smolders valiantly in that compressed environment with the tacit complicity of the crew until the Old Man just plain old blows his stack and then we have a shouting match and, as is the way with guys, things get better and we outwit the [you supply it] lurking there beyond in the somber depths to sail home at last. ...

In its opening week, the film finished third at the US box office. On the review aggregator website Rotten Tomatoes, 100% of 13 critics' reviews are positive.

== Legacy ==
The 2023 Netflix series Gamera Rebirth has the third episode titled Run Silent, Run Deep as an homage to the Wise film.

In the Twin Peaks revival, the character Nadine opens a store to sell silent drape runners named Run Silent Run Drapes.
