= USS Vestal =

Collier of the United States Navy

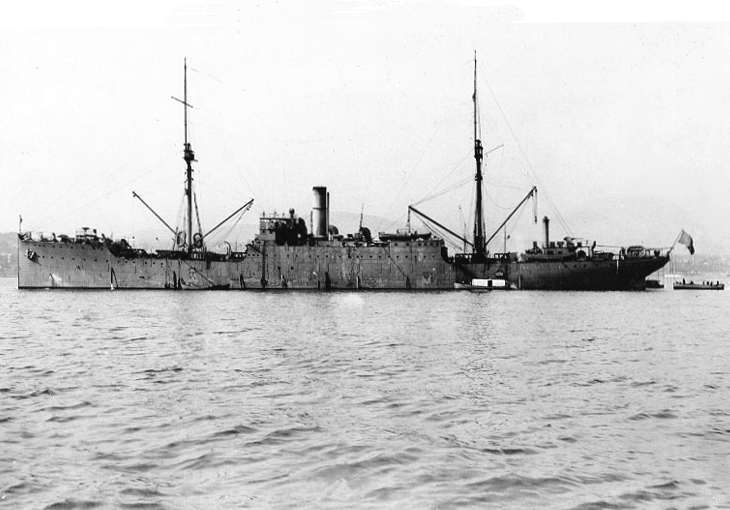
- USS Vestal (AR-4) in the 1920s

History

United States
- Name: USS Vestal
- Laid down: 25 March 1907
- Launched: 19 May 1908
- Sponsored by: Miss Goodrich
- In service: 4 October 1909
- Out of service: 25 October 1912
- Commissioned: 3 September 1913
- Decommissioned: 14 August 1946
- Stricken: 25 September 1946
- Fate: Scrapped 28 July 1950

General characteristics
- Displacement: 12,585 tons
- Length: 465 ft 9 in (141.96 m)
- Beam: 60 ft (18.3 m)
- Draft: 26 ft 0 in (7.92 m) (mean)
- Speed: 16 knots (18 mph; 30 km/h)
- Complement: 35 Officers; 748 Enlisted
- Armament: 3 × Single 3 in (76.2 mm) DP guns; 2 × Twin 40 mm Bofors guns

USS Vestal (AR-4) was a repair ship in service with the United States Navy from 1913 to 1946. Before her conversion to a repair ship, she had served as a collier since 1909. Vestal served in both World Wars. She was damaged during the Japanese attack on Pearl Harbor and received two battle stars for her World War II service.

== Commissioning ==
The history of USS Vestal (AR-4) began when Erie (Fleet Collier No. 1) was authorized on 17 April 1904; but the ship was renamed Vestal in October 1905, well before her keel was laid down on 25 March 1907 at the New York Navy Yard, Brooklyn, New York. Launched on 19 May 1908, Vestal was placed in service as a fleet collier, with a civilian crew, at her builders' yard on 4 October 1909.

== Atlantic service 1909–1927 ==
=== Refitting ===
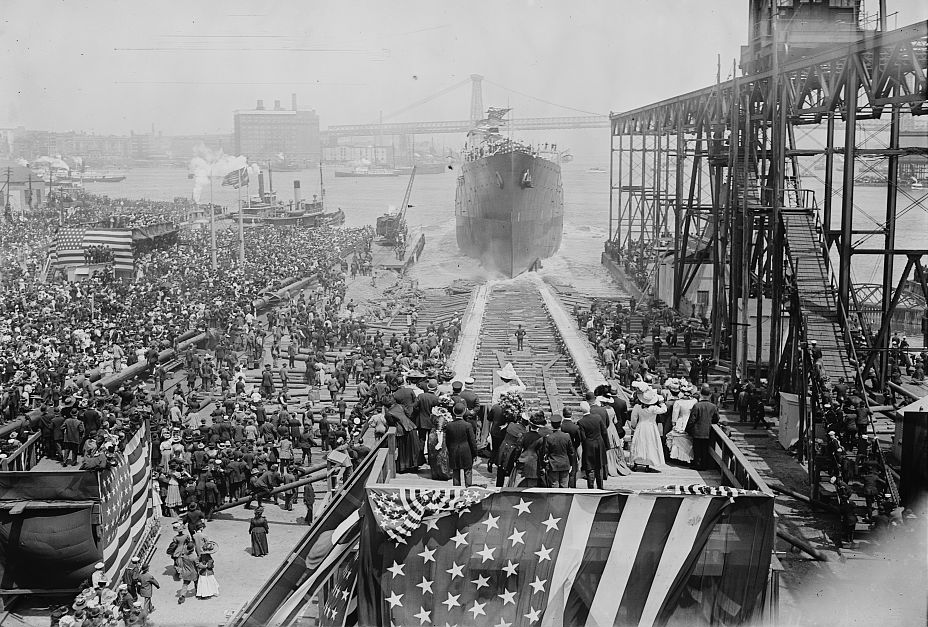
The launching of USS Vestal from the Brooklyn Navy Yard on 19 May 1908

Vestal served the fleet as a collier, operating along the Atlantic coast and in the West Indies from the autumn of 1909 to the summer of 1910. After a voyage to Europe to coal ships of the Atlantic Fleet in those waters, the ship returned to the Philadelphia Navy Yard and was taken out of service at the Boston Navy Yard on 25 October 1912. The ship underwent nearly a year's worth of yard work and was commissioned as a fleet repair ship in 1913 under the command of Commander Edward L. Beach, Sr., USN (father of submariner Captain Edward L. Beach, Jr.).

After fitting out, Vestal departed her conversion yard on 26 October for Hampton Roads, Virginia, where she conducted her shakedown between 29 October to 10 November. After touching at Key West, Florida, for coal on 14 November, Vestal moved on to Pensacola, Florida, her base for operations as a repair ship for the Atlantic Fleet. She was attached to the Atlantic fleet and served along the east coast and in the West Indies until spring of 1914 when she was dispatched along with other ships for the occupation of the Mexican port of Vera Cruz. The auxiliary vessel provided repair services at Vera Cruz from 2 May to 20 September before she sailed for Boston, escorting the cruiser Salem to the navy yard there for overhaul.

Vestal then operated off the Virginia Capes and in Guantanamo Bay, Cuba, before she returned to the Boston Navy Yard on 10 June 1915, after calls at New York City and Newport, Rhode Island She took on stores and provisions at Boston and underwent repairs there before she rejoined the fleet at Narragansett Bay on 19 May 1916.

=== World War I ===
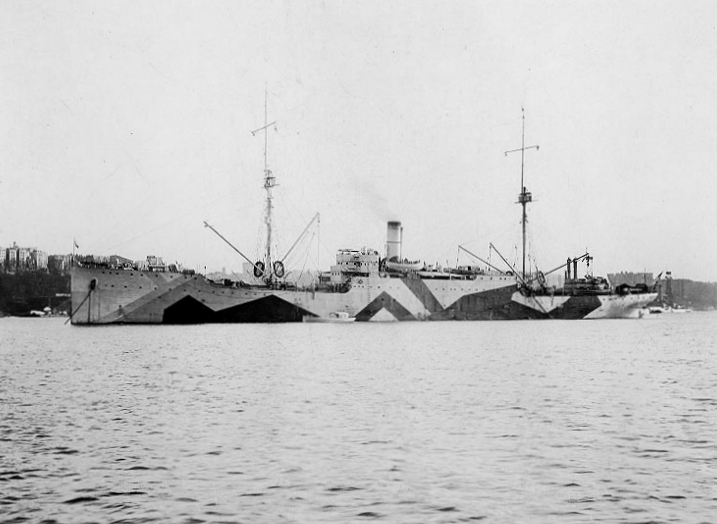
USS Vestal off New York City, in 1918

Following the U.S. entry into World War I, Vestal was deployed to Queenstown, Ireland, where she provided services for ships of the 1st Destroyer Flotilla. She stayed there for the duration of the war and beyond, finally returning in 1919. For the next six years Vestal served the Scouting Force and Battle Fleet. During the navy-wide assignment of alphanumeric hull numbers on 17 July 1920, Vestal was classified as a repair ship, AR-4.

In 1925 she underwent modification that changed her from a coal-powered ship to an oil-fired one. Soon thereafter, on 25 September, the submarine USS S-51 was rammed and sunk by SS City of Rome and Vestal was called to help recover the submarine. Vestal conducted her salvage operations from October to early December 1925 and again from 27 April to 5 July 1926. During the latter period, the submarine was raised from the bottom. Following the completion of recovery, Vestal was transferred to the Pacific Fleet in 1927.

== Pacific service 1927–1946 ==
The Pacific Fleet was shifted to a new base at Pearl Harbor following Fleet Problem XXI in the spring of 1940. Vestal also made the move. After returning from the west coast for an overhaul at the Mare Island Navy Yard, Vallejo, California, Vestal resumed her duties. On 6 December 1941, she was moored alongside USS Arizona, at berth F 7, off Ford Island, to provide services to the battleship during her scheduled period of tender upkeep between 6 and 12 December.

=== Pearl Harbor ===
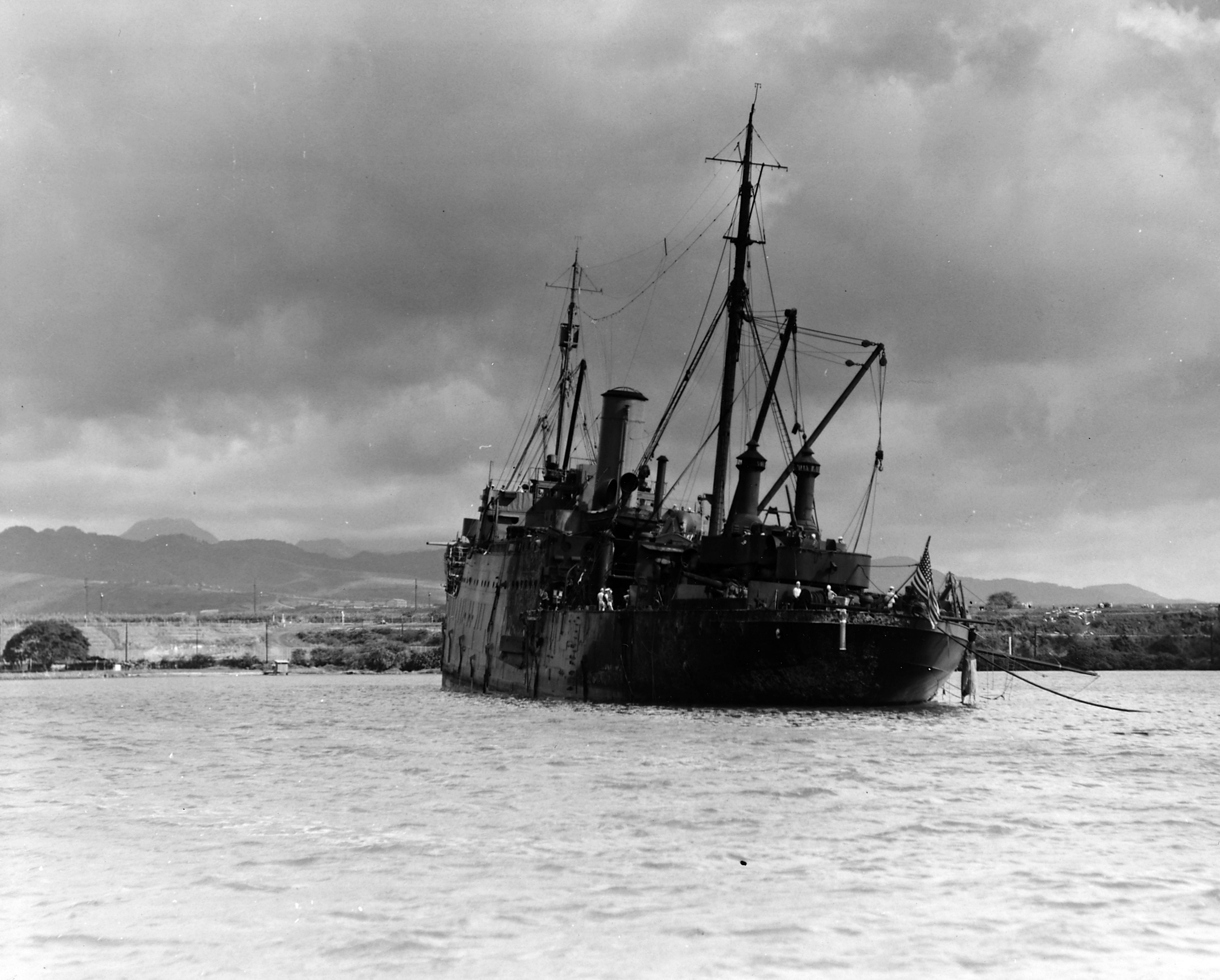
USS Vestal beached and listing after being hit in the attack on Pearl Harbor, 7 December 1941

On December 7 shortly before 08:00 Japanese carrier-based aircraft swept down upon Pearl Harbor. At 07:55, Vestal went to general quarters, manning every gun. At about 08:05, her 3-inch (76 mm) gun commenced firing.

At about the same time, two bombs – intended for the more valuable battleship inboard on Battleship Row – hit the repair ship. One struck the port side, penetrated three decks, passed through a crew's space, and exploded in a storage hold, starting fires that necessitated flooding the forward magazines. The second hit the starboard side, passed through the carpenter shop and the shipfitter shop, and left an irregular hole about five feet in diameter in the bottom of the ship.

The 3-inch (76 mm) gun jammed after three rounds, and the crew was working to clear the jam when an explosion blew Vestal's gunners overboard. Thereafter, maintaining anti-aircraft fire became secondary to saving the ship.

At about 08:10, a bomb penetrated Arizona's deck near the starboard side of number 2 turret and exploded in the powder magazine below. The resultant explosion touched off adjacent main battery magazines, exploding the forward part of the battleship and literally clearing Vestal's deck of her crew.

Among those blown overside was her commanding officer, Commander Cassin Young. He swam back to the ship, and countermanded an abandon ship order given by another officer by coolly saying, "Lads, we're getting this ship underway." Fortunately, the engineer officer still had the "black gang" getting up steam.

Oil from the ruptured tanks of the Arizona caught fire in the explosion, which in turn set Vestal ablaze aft and amidships. At 08:45 men forward cut her mooring lines with axes, freeing her from Arizona, and she got underway, steering by engines alone. The naval tug Hoga, whose tugmaster had served aboard Vestal just a few months before the attack, pulled Vestal's bow away from the inferno engulfing Arizona and the repair ship, and the latter began to creep out of danger. In spite of slowly assuming a list to starboard and settling by the stern, she anchored in 35 feet (11 m) of water off McGrew's Point at 09:10.

Continued flooding caused Vestal to settle by the stern and increased the list to six and one-half degrees. At the direction of Commander Young, Vestal got underway again at 09:50, less than an hour after the Japanese attack ended. Vestal intentionally ran aground at Aiea Bay soon thereafter. Commander Young explained his order to run aground in his after-action report: "Because of the unstable condition of the ship...", Young explained in his after-action report, "...(the) ship being on fire in several places and the possibility of further attacks, it was decided to ground the ship." Commander Young was awarded the Medal of Honor for his actions in saving Vestal.

Despite being damaged herself Vestal participated in some of the post-attack salvage operations, sending repair parties to the overturned hull of the battleship Oklahoma so that welders could cut into the ship and rescue men trapped there after the battleship capsized.

In the days following the attack, Vestal's men repaired their own ship because yard facilities were at a premium. Within a week of the raid Vestal's crew had pumped out the oil and water that had flooded the compartments below the waterline and cleared out the damaged and gutted holds – all work that had to be completed before the rebuilding process could begin.

=== Tongatapu ===
After repairs and alterations and operations at Pearl Harbor Vestal received orders on 12 August 1942 to proceed to the South Pacific. She set sail for Tongatapu in the Tonga Islands. She arrived there two weeks later, on 29 August, less than a month after the launching of Operation Watchtower, the invasion of the Solomon Islands. Over the months that followed the Japanese would contest the Americans and their Australian and New Zealand allies with skill and tenacity.

During Vestal's 60 days at Tongatapu she completed 963 repair jobs for some 58 ships and four shore activities. Included were repairs to warships such as Saratoga (torpedoed by Japanese submarine I-26 on 31 August); South Dakota (damaged from grounding at Lahai Passage, Tonga Islands, on 6 September); and North Carolina (torpedo damage suffered on 15 September).

==== Repairing USS South Dakota ====
One of the more difficult jobs was the one performed on South Dakota. The battleship had run aground on an uncharted reef and put into Tongatapu for emergency repairs. Vestal's divers commenced their work at 16:00 on 6 September and began checking the ship's seams. With only six divers working, Vestal's party operated until 02:00 on 7 September and reported the damage as a series of splits extending along some 150 feet (46 m) of the ship's bottom. By the next morning, 8 September, Vestal's skilled repairmen, together with men of the battleship's crew, managed to mend the damage sufficiently to allow the ship to return to the United States for permanent repairs.

==== Repairing USS Saratoga ====
When Saratoga put into Tongatapu after being torpedoed by I-26 on 31 August, Vestal's divers combined forces with USS Navajo to inspect the damage and later trim and brace the hole. Pumps managed to clear the water out of the flooded fire room and tons of cement were poured into the hole to patch the damaged area. Within 12 days of her arrival at Tongatapu, Saratoga was able to return to the United States.

=== Nouméa and the Battle of the Santa Cruz Islands ===
==== Repairing USS Enterprise ====
Vestal subsequently sailed for the New Hebrides on 26 October, though a change of orders brought her to New Caledonian waters instead, and she reached Nouméa on 31 October. Her arrival could not have been more timely, as the Battle of the Santa Cruz Islands had taken place just days before, from 25 to 27 October. South Dakota and Enterprise, two of the most heavily damaged ships in the battle, were at Nouméa.

A bomb hit on the latter had buckled a 30-by-60-foot (9.1 by 18.3 m) section of the flight deck, aft, bulging it about four feet above deck level. In addition, the hit flooded the aft elevator machinery room and blew out bulkheads and damaged furniture in "officer's country." Ordered to sea before the damage was completely repaired, the carrier took with her two Vestal officers and a large repair party of 75 Seabees, who continued work even when Enterprise went to battle stations. Those Vestal men were included in the Presidential Unit Citation awarded to Enterprise.

==== Repairing USS South Dakota ====
South Dakota, like Enterprise, had suffered major damage. She had taken a bomb hit on one of her 16-inch (410 mm) gun turrets, had been torn by shrapnel, and had collided with the destroyer USS Mahan during the battle. The destroyer had not only holed the battleship's starboard side but had left an anchor in the wardroom. Even though Vestal repair parties were busy with Enterprise's urgent repairs they also went to work on the damaged South Dakota, listing her over to patch the hole on the battleship's starboard side at the waterline. Her craftsmen repaired the wardroom (removing Mahan's anchor in the process), patched shrapnel holes, and put sprung hatches and damaged fire mains in order. She was back in action in just five days.

=== Espiritu Santo ===
During her time at Nouméa, Vestal completed 158 jobs on 21 ships; she departed that port on 13 November; reached Espiritu Santo three days later; and began a year's schedule of repair service. During the next 12 months, Vestal tackled some 5,603 jobs on 279 ships and 24 shore facilities. Some of the outstanding repair jobs were on ships damaged during the bitter naval engagements in the Solomons in late 1942 and early 1943. There were: San Francisco, ripped by heavy caliber hits during the night battle off Savo Island on 13 November 1942; New Orleans and Pensacola, the latter with a torpedo hole measuring 24 by 40 feet (12 m), a flooded after engine room, and two propeller shafts broken; the New Zealand light cruiser HMNZS Achilles - already famous for her part in the 1939 Battle of the River Plate and the subsequent sinking of the German pocket battleship Graf Spee - which, besides shrapnel and collision damage, had taken a direct hit on her after turret; and the torpedoed and fire-damaged cargo ship Alchiba.

In addition, she performed repairs on the torpedoed light cruiser St. Louis, the torpedoed Australian light cruiser HMAS Hobart; the bomb-damaged transport Zeilin; and others, including Tappahannock and HMNZS Leander. She also corrected battle damage to and performed alterations on 12 LST's and a large number of miscellaneous lesser ships. Only once during that time, from 27 May to 2 June 1943, did the ship herself undergo repairs.

==== Repairing USS Pensacola ====
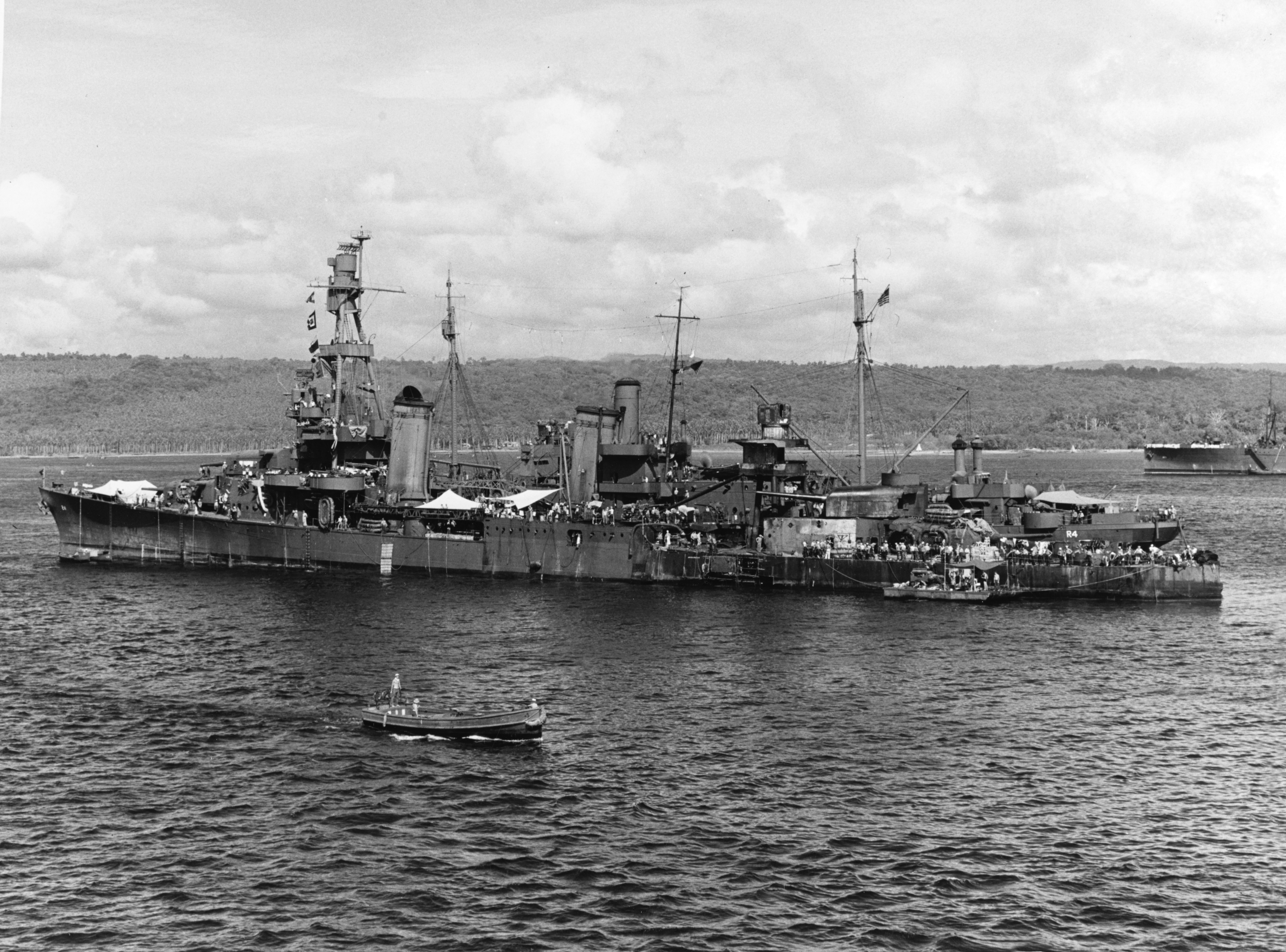
Vestal alongside USS Pensacola at Espiritu Santo, in December 1942

One of the most outstanding pieces of salvage work performed by Vestal was for the heavy cruiser Pensacola, heavily damaged at the Battle of Tassafaronga. A torpedo had caused such extensive damage aft that her stern was barely attached to the rest of the ship and swayed gently with the current. A few frames, some hull plating, and one propeller shaft were practically all that still held the aftermost section to the rest of the ship. As Vestal's commanding officer later recounted, "Never had an AR (repair ship) been presented with such a task; no records on how it should best be done were available."

By trial and error, and relying on previous experience, Vestal workers turned-to. The hole was plugged and braced for stability, compartments that could be were sealed and pumped out; three propellers of about seven tons each were pulled off to reduce drag. "One has to be something of an artificer", her commanding officer recounted, "... to realize the problems that came up to do with this job, such as underwater welding and cutting, which was still a fairly new thing." Vestal's force used a dynamite charge to jar one propeller loose and had to burn through the shaft of another to get it off.

After Pensacola came Minneapolis, torpedoed amidships and with 75 feet (23 m) of her bow missing. Vestal put her in shape, too, for a trip to a stateside yard where permanent repairs could be made. "So it went", continued the commanding officer, "... one broken, twisted, torpedoed, burned ship after another was repaired well enough to make a navy yard or put back on the firing line."

=== Funafuti ===
On 18 November 1943, Vestal departed Espiritu Santo, bound for the Ellice Islands, and reached her destination, Funafuti, on the 22nd. During her brief stay there the repair ship completed some 604 major repair tasks for 77 ships and for eight shore activities. Her outstanding job during that tour was her work on the light carrier Independence.

=== Marshall Islands ===
Underway for Makin on 30 January 1944, Vestal's orders were changed en route. The ship proceeded instead for the Marshall Islands, reaching Majuro atoll on 3 February. The big repair job awaiting her there was that for the battleship Washington, which had suffered heavy collision damage forward with the Indiana. Although estimates called for it to be a 30-day job, Vestal, often working 24-hour shifts, completed the task in only 10 days. After that, Washington sailed for Pearl Harbor to receive permanent repairs.

In need of repairs herself, especially new evaporators, Vestal departed Majuro and sailed, via Pearl Harbor, for the Mare Island Navy Yard. Upon conclusion of those repairs, the addition of new equipment, alterations, a general overhaul, and a vari-colored paint job, Vestal departed Mare Island on 8 September, bound for the Carolines. Her voyage took her via Pearl Harbor and Eniwetok. There she picked up tows for the remainder of her voyage, a cement barge, Chromite, and the Navy ammunition barge YF-254. She reached Ulithi on 15 October 1944.

During the ship's sojourn at Ulithi, Vestal completed 2,195 jobs for 149 ships – including 14 battleships, nine carriers, five cruisers, five destroyers, 35 tankers, and other miscellaneous naval and merchant ships. Her biggest repair job of that time was the light cruiser Reno, torpedoed off San Bernardino Strait by Japanese submarine I-41 on the night of 3 November. Once again, Vestal's workers performed their tasks quickly and efficiently, having Reno on her way in a short time for permanent repairs in a stateside yard.

=== Saipan and Okinawa ===
Underway for the Marianas on 25 February 1945, Vestal arrived at Saipan two days later, to commence what would be over two months of service there, principally repairing amphibious craft used for the Iwo Jima invasion. While Vestal lay at anchor at Saipan, the Okinawa invasion commenced on 1 April 1945. Less than a month later, Vestal sailed for Kerama Retto, a chain of islands off the southwestern tip of Okinawa, and arrived there on 1 May.

During May, Vestal went to general quarters 59 times as Japanese planes made suicide attacks on the ships engaged in the bitter Okinawa campaign. Experience proved that the best defense against the suiciders was a smoke or fog screen produced by all ships that blended into one gigantic mass of low-hanging clouds. For that purpose, Vestal had two boats equipped with fog generators and several barrels of oil. Besides the fog generators, smoke pots would be thrown over the bow of the ship to emit a dense, white, sickly-smelling smoke for about 15 minutes apiece. Besides the danger posed by suiciders, deck sentries kept a sharp lookout for any enemy who might attempt to swim out to the ships with mines or explosive charges.

At Kerama Retto, Vestal's big job was repairing destroyers. Her jobs included the kamikaze-damaged Newcomb and Evans.

Vestal remained at Kerama Retto through mid-June before she got underway on the 23d for Nakagusuku Wan, later renamed Buckner Bay, arriving there later that same day. The repair ship remained in that body of water for the remainder of the war. At 20:55 on 10 August 1945, a pyrotechnic display burst forth as word arrived telling that Japan was entertaining thoughts of surrender. "So great was the display of fireworks and so immense the feeling of victory that once the tension had been broken, the true peace announcement received at 0805, 15 August 1945, caused hardly a ripple of enthusiasm: nevertheless the spirit of victory was uppermost in the hearts and conversations of all hands."

=== Post-World War II service ===
The main danger to the fleet after Japan surrendered was typhoons. Vestal had sortied twice from Buckner Bay before "V-J Day" — once on 19 July and once on 1 August. On 16 September, Vestal sortied for the third time on typhoon evasion, returning to the harbor the next day after having ridden out 68-knot (126 km/h) winds and heavy seas.

Vestal carried out storm-damage repairs over the ensuing days before another typhoon – the fourth for the Ryūkyūs that year – swirled in from the sea on the 28th. Upon receipt of orders from Commander, Service Division 104, Vestal weighed anchor and headed out to sea at 15:00, her stem sluicing seaward from Buckner Bay. "The glassy sea, humid atmosphere, and falling barometer portended the approaching engagement between ship and her relentlessly violent foes, sea and wind."

The merchantmen Fleetwood and Kenyan Victory took positions 800 yards (730 m) astern and in single file with Vestal leading the way, steaming westward and away from the threatening blackness massing to the east of Okinawa. Overhauling a four-ship convoy, Captain H. J. Pohl, Vestal's commanding officer, assumed command of the now seven-ship group. The ships met the fierce winds head-on to lessen the roll and steered to take the surging seas on the quarter, maneuvering skillfully to prevent damage or, worse, loss. By late in the afternoon of the third day, Pohl, the convoy's commodore, had his ships back in Buckner Bay, safe and sound.

That particular storm-evasion sortie proved only to be a realistic exercise compared to what came next. On 6 October, Vestal received warnings of Typhoon Louise (1945) — a tropical storm 400 miles (640 km) in diameter with winds of 100 knots (190 km/h) near the center, moving west-northwest at 17 knots (31 km/h).

At 00:15 on the 7th, Vestal and all ships present in Buckner Bay received word to prepare to execute typhoon plan "X-ray" upon one hour's notice. By mid-afternoon, those orders arrived; and the fleet began stirring itself to action for its survival. Among the first vessels to get underway was Vestal, the venerable repair ship clearing the harbor entrance at 16:00, steaming due east. Ultimately, Beaver and the merchantmen Hope Victory, Grey's Harbor, and Esso Rochester joined her.

Rising seas, increasing winds, and a plummeting barometer ushered in Monday, 8 October, but Vestal and her brood maintained their eastward course through the next day, 9 October – the day when the typhoon struck Okinawa with unparalleled force. At that time, Vestal was steering a "crazy-patch course", eluding the storm that included seas up to 40 feet (12 m) high and winds registering between 50 and 65 knots (120 km/h). Hoping for a possible entry into Buckner Bay on Wednesday, 10 October, Vestal headed westerly, bucking strong head winds.

At 14:05 on 10 October, while Vestal headed back to Buckner Bay, a signalman on the flying bridge called out: "Life raft on port bow." "Second life raft on port beam", came another cry only a few moments later. Barely perceptible several thousand yards to port were tiny specks, rising with the waves – specks which turned out to be the survivors of the sunken USS LSM-15 that had gone down in the fury of the typhoon during the previous night.

Ordering the other ships to proceed independently, Vestal put about to port and shortly thereafter swung to windward of the nearest life raft. In the lee thus formed, the repair ship lowered a motor whaleboat; that craft picked up 17 men from the first raft. Ultimately, 15 more survivors clambered up the boarding nets to safety; a total of two officers and 30 men were recovered from the sea.

Entering Buckner Bay at dusk, Vestal witnessed the savage typhoon's aftermath with the dawn of the 11th. Once again, Vestal immediately turned to the task of repairing the battered ships of the fleet.

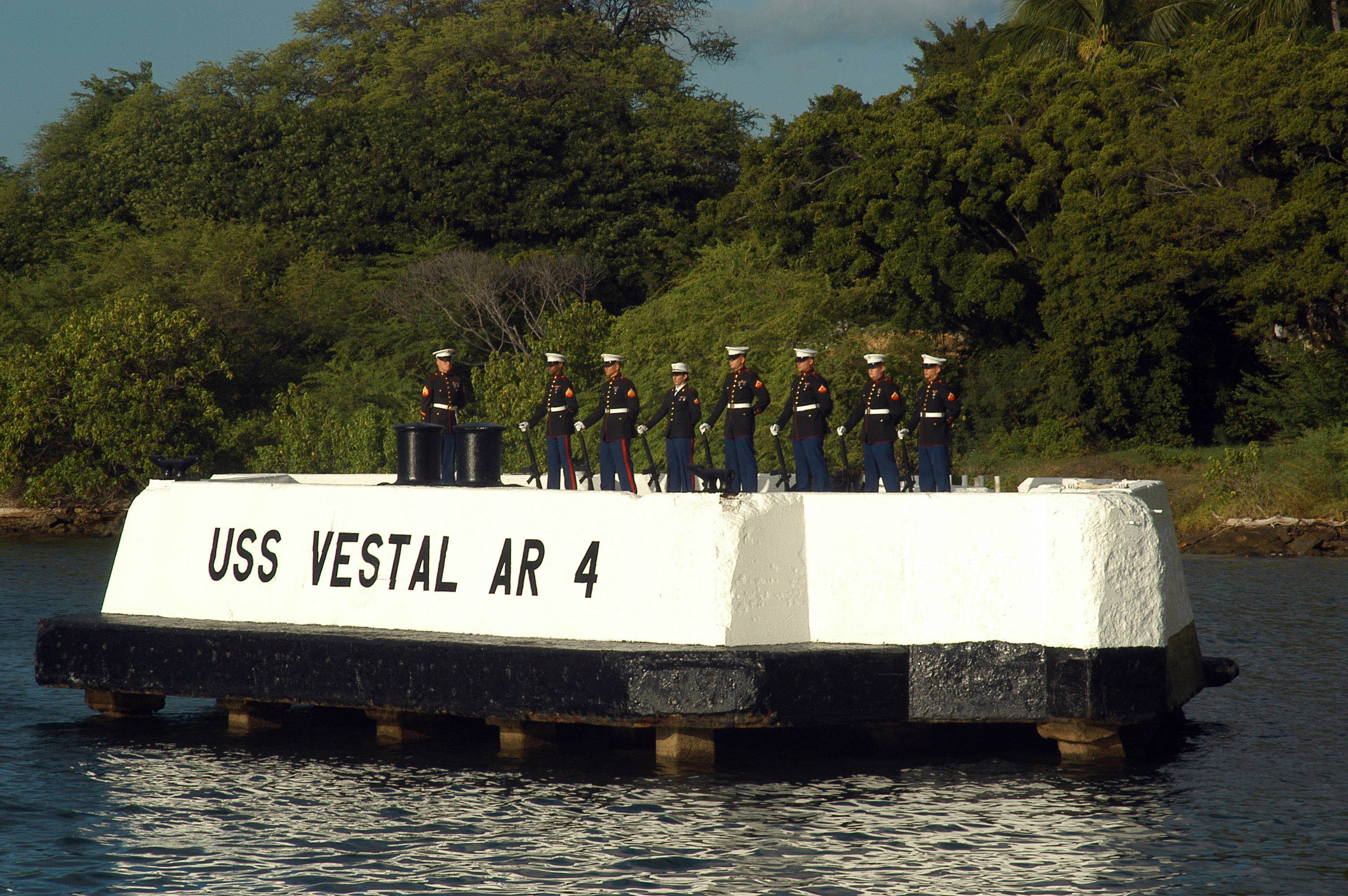
The Vestal mooring quay memorial at Pearl Harbor

Subsequently, Vestal performed her vital service functions supporting the occupation of China and Japan, before she sailed back to the United States. Her disposal was delayed in order to allow the ship to perform decommissioning work on other ships referred to the 13th Naval District for disposal, Vestal was ultimately decommissioned at the Puget Sound Naval Shipyard on 14 August 1946. Struck from the Navy List on 25 September of the same year, she lay inactive for the next two and one-half years before stripping began on 20 May 1949. Her hull was sold on 28 July 1950 to the Boston Metals Company, Baltimore, Maryland, and subsequently scrapped.

Vestal (AR-4) received two battle stars for her World War II service.
