= USS Eel =

USS Eel may refer to:

- USS Eel (SS-354), a proposed United States Navy Balao-class submarine; the contract for her construction was cancelled in 1944
- USS Eel, a fictitious World War II U.S. Navy submarine which appears in Edward L. Beach's 1955 novel Run Silent, Run Deep and in the 1958 movie Run Silent, Run Deep based on the novel.
