= USS Chicolar =

USS Chicolar has been the name of one United States Navy ship, and may refer to:

- USS Chicolar (SS-464), a proposed submarine cancelled in 1944.

Fiction

- A fictional World War II U.S. Navy submarine named USS Chicolar appears in Edward L. Beach, Jr.'s novel Dust on the Sea
