= USS Nerka =

USS Nerka may refer to:

- USS Nerka (SS-380), a United States Navy submarine authorized during World War II; her construction contract was canceled in July 1944
- USS Nerka, a fictional World War II submarine of the United States Navy that serves as the setting for the 1958 film Run Silent, Run Deep, an adaptation of the 1955 novel of the same name.
