= USS S-16 =

S-class submarine of the United States

Coordinates: 24°25.207′N 82°02.393′W

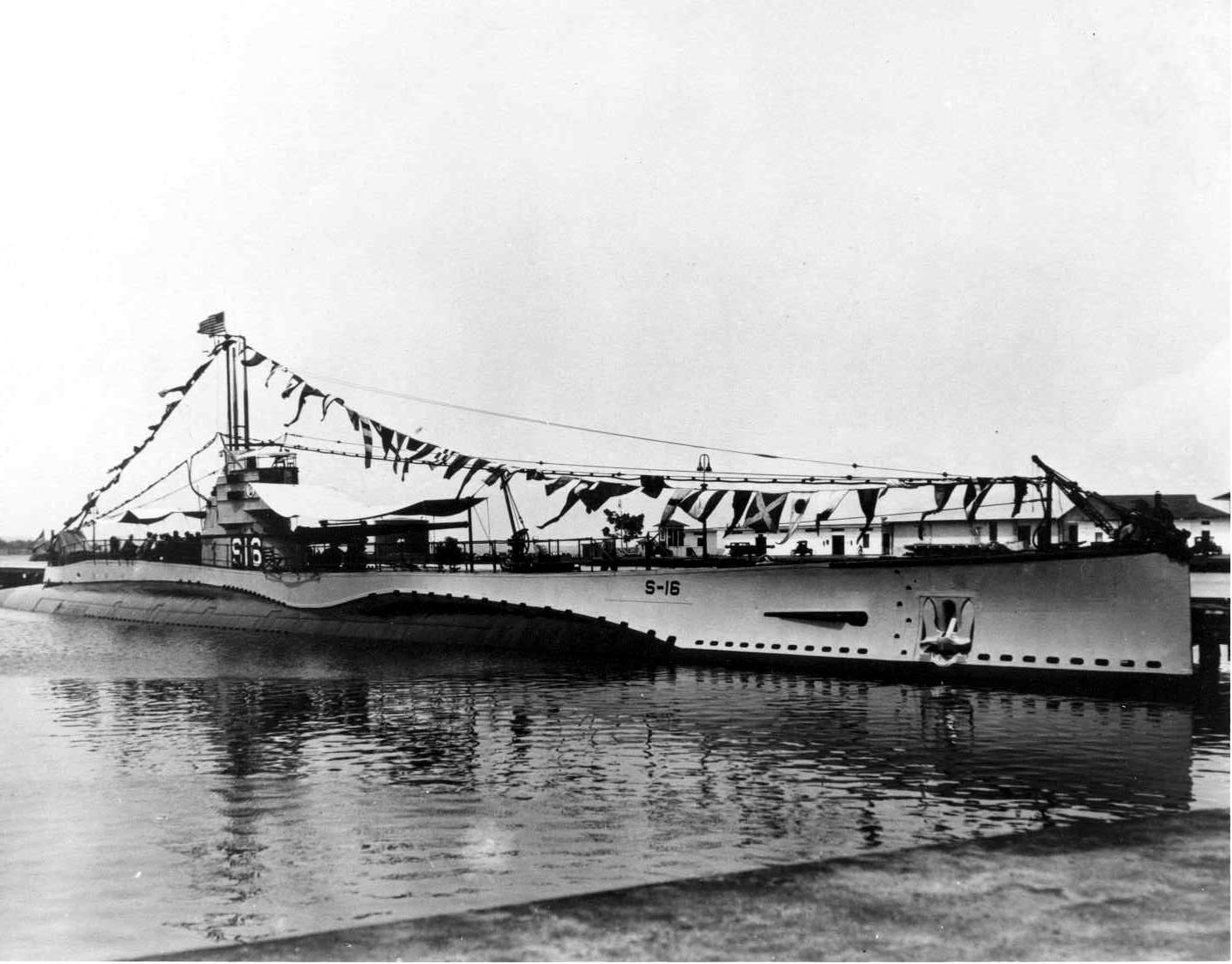
- USS S-16 (SS-121), lies at dock after launching at the Lake Torpedo Boat Company, Bridgeport, Connecticut, 23 December 1919

History

United States
- Name: S-16
- Builder: Lake Torpedo Boat Company, Bridgeport, Connecticut
- Cost: $1,020,828.90 (hull and machinery)
- Laid down: 19 March 1918
- Launched: 23 December 1919
- Sponsored by: Mrs. Ann McNeil
- Commissioned: 17 December 1920
- Decommissioned: 22 May 1935
- Recommissioned: 2 December 1940
- Decommissioned: 4 October 1944
- Stricken: 13 November 1944
- Identification: Hull symbol: SS-121; Call sign: NINC
- Fate: Sunk as a target, 3 April 1945

General characteristics
- Class & type: S-3-class submarine
- Displacement: 875 long tons (889 t) surfaced; 1,088 long tons (1,105 t) submerged
- Length: 231 feet (70 m)
- Beam: 21 ft 10 in (6.65 m)
- Draft: 13 ft 1 in (3.99 m)
- Installed power: 1,400 brake horsepower (1,044 kW) diesel; 1,200 hp (895 kW) electric
- Propulsion: 2 × Busch-Sulzer 6M150 diesel engines; 2 × Westinghouse Electric Corporation electric motors; 2 × 60-cell batteries; 2 × Propellers
- Speed: 15 knots (28 km/h; 17 mph) surfaced; 11 kn (20 km/h; 13 mph) submerged
- Test depth: 200 ft (61 m)
- Capacity: 36,950 US gallons (139,900 L; 30,770 imp gal) fuel
- Complement: 4 officers; 34 enlisted
- Armament: 4 × Bow 21-inch (533 mm) torpedo tubes (12 torpedoes); 1 × Stern 21-in torpedo tube (2 torpedoes); 1 × 4-inch (102 mm)/50-caliber

USS S-16 (SS-121) was an S-3-class, also referred to as a "Government"-type, submarine of the United States Navy.

== Design ==
The "Government"-type had a length of 231 feet (70.4 m) overall, a beam of 21 ft 10 in (6.7 m), and a mean draft of 13 ft 1 in (4.0 m). They displaced 875 long tons (889 t) on the surface and 1,088 long tons (1,105 t) submerged. All S-class submarines had a crew of 4 officers and 34 enlisted men, when first commissioned. They had a diving depth of 200 ft (61.0 m).

For surface running, the "Government"-type built by Lake Torpedo Boat Company, were powered by two 700-brake-horsepower (522 kW) Busch-Sulzer 6M150 diesel engines, each driving one propeller shaft. When submerged each propeller was driven by a 600-horsepower (447 kW) Westinghouse Electric Corporation electric motor. They could reach 15 knots (28 km/h; 17 mph) on the surface and 11 kn (20 km/h; 13 mph) underwater.

The boats were armed with four 21-inch (533 mm) torpedo tubes in the bow. They carried 8 reloads, for a total of twelve torpedoes. The "Government"-type submarines were also armed with a single 4 in (100 mm)/50 caliber deck gun.

== Construction ==
S-16's keel was laid down on 19 March 1918, by the Lake Torpedo Boat Company, in Bridgeport, Connecticut. She was launched on 23 December 1919, sponsored by Mrs. Ann McNeil, wife of Connecticut State Senator Archibald McNeil, Jr., and commissioned on 17 December 1920.

== Service history ==
=== 1921–1935 ===
Departing from New London, Connecticut, on 31 May 1921, S-16 was attached to Submarine Division 18 (SubDiv 18) and proceeded via the Panama Canal, California, the Territory of Hawaii, and Guam, to the Philippine Islands. She arrived at Cavite, Luzon, on 1 December 1921.

S-16 departed Cavite, on 11 October 1922, visited Hong Kong, from 14 to 28 October, and returned to Cavite, on 1 November 1922. Departing Manila, on 15 May 1923, she visited Shanghai, Yantai, and Qinhuangdao, in China, before returning, via Wusong and Amoy, to Cavite, on 11 September 1923. In the summer of 1924, she visited Shanghai, Qingdao, Yantai, and Qinhuangdao, returning to Olongapo, in the Philippines, on 23 September 1924. Departing Cavite, on 3 November 1924, she arrived at the Mare Island Navy Yard, California, on 30 December 1924.

S-16 remained at Mare Island in 1925 and 1926, and operated along the California coast, in 1927, with a visit to Hawaii, in July–August 1927.

From February 1928 until 1935, S-16 served in the Panama Canal area, although she visited Baltimore, Maryland, from 15 May to 5 June 1933. She departed Coco Solo, in the Panama Canal Zone, on 25 January 1935. S-16 was decommissioned at the Philadelphia Navy Yard, on 22 May 1935.

=== 1940–1944 ===
S-16 was recommissioned on 2 December 1940. Following voyages to Bermuda and the Panama Canal Zone, she operated at Saint Thomas, in the US Virgin Islands, from December 1941, during which the United States entered World War II with the Japanese attack on Pearl Harbor on 7 December, to March 1942, then in the Panama Canal area, from April to August 1942.

On 13 July 1942, she was on the surface in the Caribbean Sea, off Panama, when she suffered damage from bombs accidentally dropped near her by United States Army Air Forces planes attacking the German U-boat U-153; the damage prevented her from diving, and she proceeded to port on the surface.

S-16 was based at New London, from September 1942 to June 1944, with operations at Casco Bay, Maine.

== Fate ==
S-16 was decommissioned on 4 October 1944 and struck from the Naval Vessel Register. She was intentionally destroyed by sinking off Key West, Florida, on 3 April 1945.

== Wreck ==
S-16's wreck lies in 265 feet (81 m) of water, upright with a 20° tilt to its starboard side. The Gulf Stream flows over the hull, allowing little coral growth and making wreck diving difficult to impossible. The wreck is accessible through large hatches both forward and aft of the conning tower. Both bronze propeller are covered by invertebrate growth.

== In literature ==
A fictional USS S-16 appears in Edward L. Beach, Jr.'s 1955 novel Run Silent, Run Deep. In the novel, the fictional S-16 is taken out of decommissioned status, recommissioned and prepared for war by the characters in the story, and then turned over to the Polish Navy.

== Awards ==
- American Defense Service Medal
- American Campaign Medal
- World War II Victory Medal

== Bibliography ==
- "Table 21 - Ships on Navy List June 30, 1919". Congressional Serial Set. U.S. Government Printing Office: 770. 1921.
- Friedman, Norman (1995). U.S. Submarines Through 1945: An Illustrated Design History. Annapolis, Maryland: Naval Institute Press. ISBN 1-55750-263-3.
- Priolo, Gary. "S-16 (SS-121)". Navsource.net.
- Hall, Anne Martin (1925). Ships of the United States navy and their sponsors, 1913-1923.
- "S-16". Dictionary of American Naval Fighting Ships. Navy Department, Naval History and Heritage Command. 1 September 2015. This article incorporates text from this source, which is in the public domain.
- Hedman, Ric; Johnston, David (22 October 2025). "S-14 through S-17". PigBoats.com.
- Hinman, Charles R.; Campbell, Douglas E. (2019). The Submarine Has No Friends: Friendly Fire Incidents Involving U.S. Submarines During World War II. Syneca Research Group, Inc. ISBN 978-0-359-76906-3.
- Barnette, Michael C. (2003). Shipwrecks of the Sunshine State: Florida's Submerged History. Association of Underwater Explorers. p. 160. ISBN 0-9743036-0-7.
- Rozzi, James (2008). "S-16 WW-I U.S. Submarine" (PDF). Advanced Diver Magazine Ezine (1, reprinted from ADM issue 3): 90–92.
