= Edward L. Beach Sr. =

Author and United States Naval officer

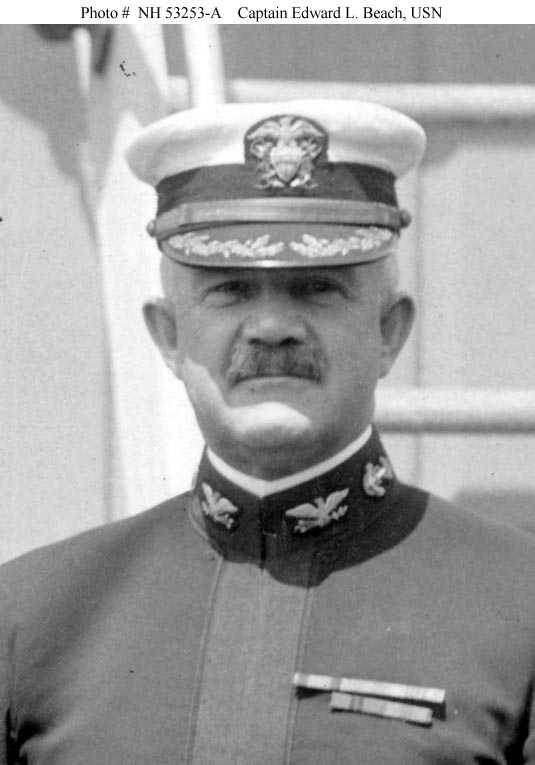
- Beach in 1916
- Born: Edward Latimer Beach Sr. June 30, 1867; Toledo, Ohio, U.S.
- Died: December 20, 1943 (aged 76); Oakland, California, U.S.
- Burial place: Golden Gate National Cemetery
- Military career
- Allegiance: United States of America
- Branch: United States Navy
- Service years: 1888–1921
- Rank: Captain
- Commands: USS Vestal; USS Washington (ACR-11); USS Tennessee (ACR-10); Naval Torpedo Station; USS New York (BB-34); Mare Island Naval Shipyard
- Conflicts: Spanish–American War; *Battle of Manila Bay; Philippine–American War; World War I
- Other work: Author, professor, city clerk and assessor

Edward Latimer Beach Sr. (June 30, 1867 – December 20, 1943) was a United States Navy officer and author. He served in three of the United States' wars, ranging from the Spanish–American War up through World War I. He was the father of the future Captain Edward L. Beach Jr. who commanded the nuclear-powered submarine USS Triton during her 1960 submerged circumnavigation and wrote the 1955 best-selling novel Run Silent, Run Deep.

== Biography ==
Edward Latimer Beach Sr. was born in Toledo, Ohio on June 30, 1867, the son of Joseph Lane Beach and Laura Colton (Osborn) Beach. His father was a lieutenant in the Confederate States Army during the Civil War.

Beach was appointed to the U.S. Naval Academy from the State of Minnesota in 1884, and graduated in June 1888 as a Passed Midshipman.

=== Naval career ===
Passed Midshipman Beach reported for duty on board the wooden steam sloop of war Richmond. After completing sea duty and further training, he was commissioned an Ensign in the United States Navy on July 1, 1890, and then assigned to engineering duties aboard the cruiser Philadelphia (C-4). His subsequent seagoing assignments included the armored cruiser New York (ACR-2) and the training ship Essex, plus engineering-related shore duty.

==== Spanish–American War and Philippine–American War ====
Beach participated in the Battle of Manila Bay during the Spanish–American War, where he served on board the cruiser Baltimore (C-3)

He subsequently participated in the ensuing war with the Philippines. During that time he was in command of a squad of men that intercepted a Filipino boat carrying the wife of Filipino leader Emilio Aguinaldo. Upon realizing who the captive was, Beach released Mrs. Aguinaldo in a gesture of Victorian gentlemanly manners. Several months later, Beach was in command of another squad of Blue Jackets searching ashore for the enemy when he was separated from his men and captured by Filipinos. When Emilio Aguinaldo learned the name of the captured naval officer he ordered Beach released, but not before the two met. They remained lifelong friends, corresponding on a regular basis.

==== Promotions ====
In 1899, as the Navy combined its line and engineer officer ranking systems, Beach became a lieutenant. He was subsequently promoted to lieutenant commander in 1905, commander in 1910, and captain in 1914.

Commander Beach served on the monitor Nevada (BM-8), the armored cruiser Montana (ACR-13), the training ship Essex as well as at the Boston Navy Yard as its engineering officer.

==== United States Naval Academy ====
In tours between duties at sea, Commander Beach taught English at the Naval Academy in the early 1900s (decade), spending his spare time writing novels for young adults.

==== United States Naval Institute ====
Commander Beach was the secretary-treasurer of the Naval Institute and published the first Bluejacket's Manual. He also produced the first general index of Proceedings of the United States Naval Institute, said index covering that journal's entries from 1874 to 1901.

==== Vera Cruz Occupation ====
In 1913, now a Commander, Beach's first command was the collier Vestal (AS-4) which assigned to support American forces ashore during the United States occupation of Veracruz, Mexico in 1914.

==== Haiti ====
By 1915, Captain Beach was in command of the armored cruiser USS Washington (ACR-11), participating in peacekeeping missions in Haiti. While his ship was in Haiti, it served as flagship for Rear Admiral William H. Caperton, USN, who utilized Beach as his go-between in negotiating a treaty with Haiti on behalf of the United States in 1915.

==== USS Tennessee ====
When Washington was due for a Navy Yard refit, Beach command was shifted to the armored cruiser Tennessee (ACR-10). While commanding Tennessee, Beach took United States Secretary of the Treasury William Gibbs McAdoo and a party of dignitaries on a tour of several South American nations. Upon returning to the United States, Tennessee' was renamed the Memphis so that the state's name could be given to a new battleship, USS Tennessee (BB-43), then under construction.

==== The wreck of the Memphis ====
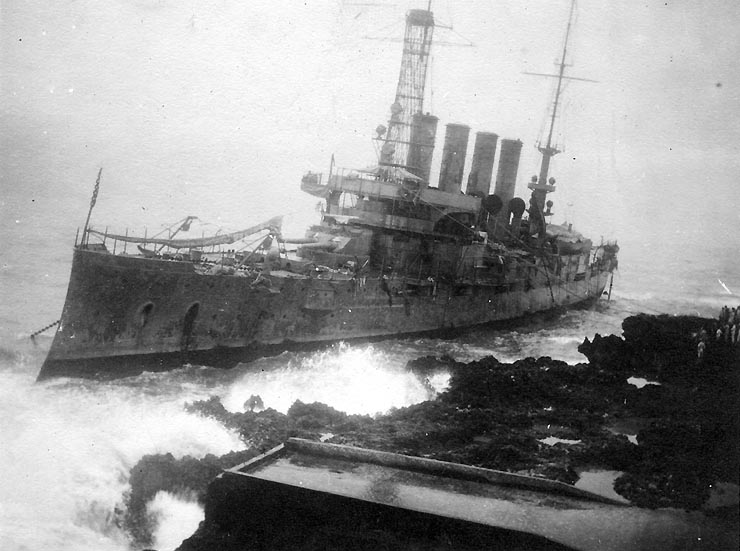
The wreck of USS Memphis.

Memphis was at anchor .5 nmi (0.58 mi; 0.93 km) off a rocky beach in 45 ft (14 m) of water in the harbor of Santo Domingo in the Dominican Republic on the afternoon of 29 August 1916 with two of her 16 boilers operating in case she needed to get underway; the gunboat USS Castine also was anchored in the harbor. Shortly after 12:00, Memphis began to roll heavily and Captain Beach observed an unexpected heavy swell developing. Memphis and Castine both made preparations to leave the harbor and began to raise steam; Memphis expected to be able to get underway at about 16:35.

Conditions in the harbor had deteriorated badly by 15:45, when Memphis sighted an approaching 75 ft (23 m) wave of yellow water stretching along the entire horizon. By 16:00, the wave was closer, had turned ochre in color, and had reached about 100 ft (30 m) in height; at the same time, Memphis was rolling 45°, so heavily that large amounts of water cascaded into the ship via her gun ports and water even was entering the ship via ventilators 50 ft (15 m) above the waterline. By 16:25, water began to enter the ship via her funnels, 70 ft (21 m) above the waterline, putting out the fires in her boilers and preventing her from raising enough steam to get underway. She began to strike the rocky harbor bottom at 16:40, damaging her propellers just as she was raising enough steam to begin moving, and her engines lost steam pressure. At about this time, the giant wave Memphis had seen approaching over the past hour arrived; she rolled into a deep trough and was struck immediately by three very large waves in rapid succession, the highest of them estimated by the crew to have been 70 ft (21 m) in height, completely swamping her except for her highest points, and washing crewmen overboard. The waves rolled her heavily, caused her to strike the harbor bottom, then pushed her to the beach .5 nmi (0.58 mi; 0.93 km) away. By 17:00, she had been driven under cliffs along the coast of the harbor and was resting on the harbor bottom. She was battered into a complete wreck in 90 minutes. Castine, meanwhile, managed to reach safer waters by getting underway and putting to sea through the large waves, although damaged by them and at times in danger of capsizing. Memphis's casualties, including a boatload of her sailors returning from shore leave in a motor launch and caught in the harbor by the huge waves, numbered 43 men dead or missing and 204 badly injured.

A court martial found Beach guilty of "not having enough steam available to get under way on short notice", with the huge waves at the time being considered a byproduct of weather and therefore predictable. In light of the circumstances, however, Beach's punishment was limited to being moved back 20 places on the seniority list, a sentence that was further reduced to five places by Secretary of the Navy Josephus Daniels when evidence was presented that the waves were a tsunami generated by an underwater earthquake, and not freak wind-driven waves generated by a hurricane.

In his detailed 1966 account of the incident, The Wreck of the Memphis, Captain Beach's son, Edward L. Beach Jr., ascribed her loss to an unexpected tsunami exceeding 100 ft (30 m) in height, as Daniels had been told, and this explanation has been carried forward by most sources discussing her loss. More recent research, however, has called this explanation into question. No record of any seismic event in the Caribbean on 29 August 1916 that could have triggered a tsunami has been found, and the rate of advance of the large wave Memphis reported — about an hour to cross the distance from the horizon to the ship — matches that of a wind-generated ocean wave (possibly a rogue wave); a tsunami, in contrast, would have covered the distance in only a few minutes. The periods of the three large waves that struck Memphis also are characteristic of large wind-generated waves rather than tsunamis.

A likely source for such large, wind-generated waves in Santo Domingo Harbor on 29 August 1916 does exist, in that three hurricanes active in the Caribbean between 12 August and 2 September 1916 passed westward just to the south. Waves generated from these storms could well have combined to create a set of large waves like those that struck and wrecked Memphis. Such a circumstance appears to explain the loss of the ship better than the tsunami theory. Oceanographer Dr. George Pararas-Carayammis in particular published an extensively detailed rebuttal demonstrating that a tsunami could not have caused the foundering of Memphis, but that the last of the three hurricanes, a category 2 hurricane, likely did, creating a 59-foot (18-meter) wave that reached a breaker height of 90 feet (27 meters) as it approached Memphis. This swamped the cruiser, ill-advisedly anchored in only 55 feet (17 meters) of water, and would have done so even had the ship been at full maneuvering power. Pararas-Carayammis concluded that had Memphis been anchored in 100 to 120 feet (30 to 37 meters) of water, she would have ridden out the swells, including the killer wave.

==== World War I ====
When the United States entered World War I (1914–1918) in April 1917, Beach was assigned to command the Navy Torpedo Station at Newport, Rhode Island.

In November 1918 he was named as commanding officer of battleship USS New York, which was the flagship of the American battleship squadron attached to the British Home Fleet. As commanding officer of New York, he welcomed King George V of Britain aboard and was present for the surrender of the German High Seas Fleet just after the end of the war.

Beach graduated from the U.S. Naval Academy at Annapolis, class of 1888. After earning the Navy Cross in World War I, he retired as a U.S. Navy captain. His son, Edward Latimer Beach Jr., graduated from the academy in 1939 and earned the Navy Cross in World War II before also retiring as a U.S. Navy captain.

==== Post-war ====
Beach's last command was the Mare Island Naval Shipyard on San Francisco Bay, where he oversaw the construction of the battleship California (BB-44). Captain Beach retired from the U.S. Navy in September 1921 after a 37-year career.

=== Literary career ===
During his lifetime, Beach published thirteen novels, all written for young adults. Twelve of the novels constitute volumes in four-book series, all written in the tradition of the Horatio Alger stories—hard work and honesty will lead to success.

Beach's novels, which were highly popular when they were first printed in the years of 1907 to 1922, were instrumental in planting the seeds for naval careers in the minds of many of the men who served as naval officers during World War II.

His autobiography, From Annapolis to Scapa Flow: the Autobiography of Edward L. Beach Sr. was published in 2003, having been edited by his son Edward L. Beach Jr., who was also a career naval officer and author.

=== Family ===
In 1895, Beach married Lucie Adelaide Quin of New York, but they had no children. She died in 1915 of breast cancer.

In 1917, Beach was married for the second time to Marie Justine Alice Fouché (1888–1970), a Haitian-Dominican woman of French ancestry. She is the daughter of Elisabeth Marguerite Cora Geffrard (1866–1900) and Joseph Philippe Fouché (1859–1899). Her maternal grandmother is Rosa Amelia Heureaux (1830–1901), a close relative of Dominican presidents Ulises "Lillis" Heureaux (1845–1899), Rafael Leonidas Trujillo Molina (1891–1961), and Joaquin Antonio Balaguer Ricardo (1906–2002). Beach and his second wife had three children: Edward L. Beach Jr., John Blair Beach, and Alice Laura Beach.

=== Retirement ===
In 1921, Beach joined the faculty of Stanford University as professor of military and naval history. He also served later as City Clerk and Assessor for the City of Palo Alto, California.

Beach died at Oak Knoll Naval Hospital, Oakland, California, on 20 December 1943, and is interred at Golden Gate National Cemetery in San Bruno, California. His second wife Alice Fouché is buried next to him.

== Awards ==
- Navy Cross
- Dewey Medal
- Spanish Campaign Medal
- Philippine Campaign Medal
- Mexican Service Medal
- Haitian Campaign Medal
- Dominican Campaign Medal
- World War I Victory Medal

=== Navy Cross ===
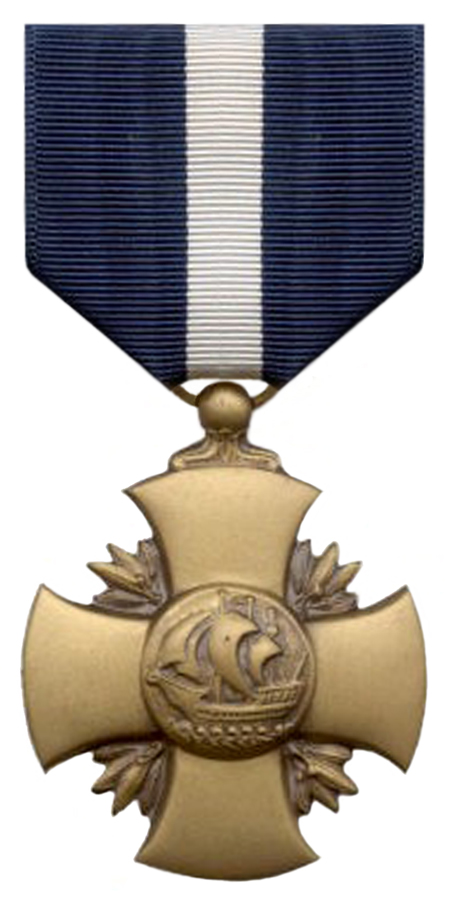

The President of the United States of America takes pleasure in presenting the Navy Cross to Captain Edward Latimer Beach Sr., United States Navy, for exceptionally meritorious service in a duty of great responsibility as Commanding Officer, U.S. Naval Torpedo Station, Newport, Rhode Island.

== Beach Hall ==
Beach Hall, headquarters of the United States Naval Institute, is named in honor of Captain Edward L. Beach Sr. and his son, Captain Edward L. Beach Jr. The building is located at the United States Naval Academy, Annapolis, Maryland.
