= USS Piper =

Submarine of the United States

Coordinates: 34°06′N 138°28′E

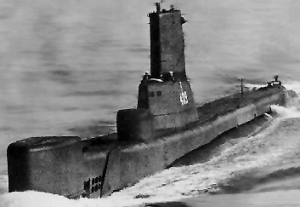
- Piper (SS-409), after Fleet Snorkel conversion.

History

United States
- Builder: Portsmouth Naval Shipyard, Kittery, Maine
- Laid down: 15 March 1944
- Launched: 26 June 1944
- Commissioned: 23 August 1944
- Decommissioned: 16 June 1967
- Stricken: 1 July 1970
- Fate: Sold for scrap, June 1971

General characteristics
- Class & type: Balao class diesel-electric submarine
- Displacement: 1,526 tons (1,550 t) surfaced; 2,401 tons (2,440 t) submerged
- Length: 311 ft 8 in (95.00 m)
- Beam: 27 ft 3 in (8.31 m)
- Draft: 16 ft 10 in (5.13 m) maximum
- Propulsion: 4 × Fairbanks-Morse Model 38D8-⅛ 10-cylinder opposed piston diesel engines driving electrical generators; 2 × 126-cell Sargo batteries; 2 × low-speed direct-drive Elliott electric motors; two propellers; 5,400 shp (4.0 MW) surfaced; 2,740 shp (2.0 MW) submerged
- Speed: 20.25 knots (38 km/h) surfaced; 8.75 knots (16 km/h) submerged
- Range: 11,000 nautical miles (20,000 km) surfaced at 10 knots (19 km/h)
- Endurance: 48 hours at 2 knots (3.7 km/h) submerged; 75 days on patrol
- Test depth: 400 ft (120 m)
- Complement: 10 officers, 70–71 enlisted
- Armament: 10 × 21-inch (533 mm) torpedo tubes; 6 forward, 4 aft; 24 torpedoes; 1 × 5-inch (127 mm) / 25 caliber deck gun; Bofors 40 mm and Oerlikon 20 mm cannon

USS Piper (SS/AGSS-409), a Balao-class submarine, was a ship of the United States Navy named after the piper. Although built late in World War II, Piper completed three successful war patrols before the cessation of hostilities, operating as a life guard for plane strikes and as an advance picket for fast carrier task forces.

== Construction and commissioning ==
Piper (originally named Awa) was laid down 15 March 1944 by the Portsmouth Navy Yard, in Kittery, Maine; launched 26 June 1944; sponsored by Mrs. Charles W. Wilkins; commissioned 23 August 1944.

== First patrol, January – March 1945 ==
Piper began her war career on 25 January 1945, when she slipped out of Pearl Harbor as the leader of a five-ship wolfpack. Piper was joined in the wolfpack by Pomfret (SS-391), Bowfin (SS-287), Trepang (SS-412), and Sterlet (SS-392), known as "MAC's MOPS." The mission was an anti-picket boat sweep in preparation for carrier strikes on Honshū. After a short stop at Saipan, the pack arrived in the assigned area south of Iwo Jima 10 February. Three sweeps from 10 February to 13 February revealed no picket boats.

Piper spent the period from 15 February to 24 March off the south and southeast coasts of Honshū serving alternately on independent patrol and lifeguard duty for the then intensive B-29 and carrier strikes against Japan. On the night of 25 February, Piper found her first target. In a night surface attack, she sank an unidentified 2,000-ton vessel. The last four days before departure were spent guarding the approaches to Bungo Suido against a possible Japanese sortie against the badly damaged carrier Franklin (CV-13).

== Second patrol, April – June 1945 ==
Piper arrived at Midway 30 March 1945 for refit and training, and departed 26 April for her second war patrol in another wolf pack. The ships arrived in the patrol area, the Sea of Okhotsk, 3 May 1945, and from 14 May to 25 May made concentrated surface sweeps of the area.

The remainder of the period was spent on independent war patrol, rotating stations. On 27 May Piper got her first chance on this patrol when she sighted two small merchantmen with two escorts in Boussole Channel. Working her way through a heavy fog, she launched a surface torpedo attack, sinking one 4,000-ton merchantman. The escorts dropped a few depth charges, but none were close to the mark.

== Third patrol, July – August 1945 ==
Piper departed the area 4 June 1945, arriving at Pearl Harbor on 13 June. Lieutenant Commander Edward L. Beach Jr. assumed command on 25 June. On 19 July 1945 she departed on her third war patrol, stopping en route at Guam for advanced training from 1 August to 4 August. On 11 August, Piper accounted for two five-ton fishing vessels in Koshiki Kaikyo, and on 13 August she entered the Sea of Japan. There she rescued six prisoners of war; Japan capitulated the next day.

== 1945 – 1951 ==
On 3 September she headed for Pearl Harbor and onward routing to the United States. Piper arrived 15 October 1945 at the U.S. Naval Submarine Base, New London, Conn. During the next five years, Piper remained in the New London area with the exception of cruises to Nassau, New Brunswick and Nova Scotia, and overhauls in Portsmouth and Philadelphia Naval Shipyards.

On 2 May 1950 Piper got under way for a tour of duty with the U.S. 6th Fleet in the Mediterranean. Upon her return to the States she made a six-week cruise to Guantanamo Bay, Cuba, for special exercises.

== 1951 – 1958 ==
In June 1951 Piper went to the Charleston Naval Shipyard for Fleet Snorkel conversion which gave her the streamlined "new look" and snorkel gear. For the next few years the submarine operated out of New London along the east coast of the United States and in the Caribbean.

In July 1955 Piper got under way for her second tour of duty with the 6th Fleet in the Mediterranean. January 1956 found her operating in the Caribbean again. From March to September she underwent an extensive overhaul in the Portsmouth Naval Shipyard.

On 1 July 1957, Rear Admiral Charles W. Wilkins, Commander Submarine Force, Atlantic Fleet selected Piper as his flagship. His wife had christened Piper at her launching in 1944. In September Piper sailed for an eight-week NATO exercise in the North Atlantic. In 1958, after completing almost a full year as Flagship of the Submarine Force, Atlantic Fleet, Piper was relieved by Seawolf (SSN-575).

== 1958 – 1966 ==
On 6 November 1959 Piper departed New London for a three-month deployment with the 6th Fleet. Throughout 1960 she remained in the New London area. On 20 February 1961 the submarine got underway for exercises in the Caribbean. On this cruise she became the first snorkel submarine to make her 10,000th dive.

In the fall of 1962 Piper was deployed in the Caribbean area during the Cuban Missile Crisis. Piper commenced another Mediterranean deployment 8 October 1963. She transited the Suez Canal to Karachi, Pakistan to participate with the Navies of the CENTO nations in exercise Midlink VI and returned to the Mediterranean early in December for operations with the 6th Fleet before returning to New London 1 February 1964.

During 1964, in conjunction with Atlantic Fleet exercises, Piper together with USS Sea Robin (SS-407) visited Portsmouth, England and Rotterdam, Netherlands. After an overhaul in the Portsmouth Naval Shipyard during the first six months of 1965, Piper sailed for the first of two Caribbean deployments 15 October, returning from the second 10 April 1966. For the remainder of that year she operated out of Submarine School, New London.

== 1967 – 1970 ==
On 22 March 1967, Piper's main storage battery had deteriorated to the extent that the ship was restricted to surface operations. At this time Piper had made 13,724 dives, a record for commissioned submarines. On 10 May Piper entered the Norfolk Naval Shipyard for deactivation. On 15 June Piper was reclassified as AGSS-409 and the next day she was placed "out of commission, special", and replaced Cero (SS-225) as the Detroit, Mich., Naval Reserve Training submarine.

Piper was struck from the Naval Vessel Register on 1 July 1970. She was sold for scrapping in June 1971.

== Honors and awards ==
Piper received four battle stars for service in World War II.
