= Run Silent, Run Deep =

Novel by Edward L. Beach Jr. published in 1955

First edition

Run Silent, Run Deep is a novel by Commander (later Captain) Edward L. Beach Jr. published in 1955 by Henry Holt & Co. The story describes World War II submarine warfare in the Pacific Ocean, and deals with themes of vengeance, endurance, courage, loyalty and honor, and how these can be tested during wartime. The name refers to "silent running", a submarine stealth tactic.

It was the first of Beach's 13 books. He told an interviewer that writing, for the most part, came easily:

Things have to happen, one thing happens after another. All of a sudden you come to an impasse, damn it, and you throw it away and start over again. The subs [Submarine!, 1952, nonfiction] I did okay, but writing about women–I never had so much trouble in my life as with this one.

The novel was on The New York Times Book Review list for several months. The staff of the New York Times Book Review included it on their list of 250 Outstanding Books of the Year. Beach served on submarines in the Pacific Ocean during the war, and this adds to the realism of the story. He composed two sequels to Run Silent, Run Deep: Dust on the Sea (1972), a third person narrative detailing later patrols of the Eel; and Cold is the Sea (1978), about the same protagonist's later service on a nuclear-powered submarine in 1960.

Run Silent, Run Deep proved to be the best-known of Beach's novels. It was adapted to a 1958 movie of the same name starring Clark Gable and Burt Lancaster.

== Plot ==
The narrative is presented as the transcript of a Navy tape recording made by Commander Edward J. Richardson, recounting the events resulting in his receipt of the Medal of Honor. The prefatory note that purports to identify the text in this way says it was meant to be used in a war bond drive, but is unsuitable for that because Richardson "failed to confine himself to pertinent elements of the broad strategy of the war, and devoted entirely too much time to personal trivia."

In the spring of 1941, Richardson takes command of a World War I S-16, a submarine retired in 1924, and soon is assigned Jim Bledsoe as his executive officer. They and their crew work at the Philadelphia Navy Yard to fit out their boat and commission her, and in August take her to New London, Connecticut, for training. There Richardson meets Bledsoe's girlfriend, Laura Elwood. The three of them are together when they learn of the attack on Pearl Harbor. Though it took Richardson three years of submarine duty to qualify for command, the war and the prospect of many more submarines coming into service lead Richardson, against his better judgment, to recommend Bledsoe for command in late December, just after learning that Bledsoe and Laura plan to wed.

Richardson is forced to withdraw his recommendation of Bledsoe when Jim shows immaturity and performs recklessly on his qualification for command, nearly sinking their boat. Bledsoe is resentful, and Laura despises Richardson for ruining Bledsoe's chance for a command. Richardson and his crew, including Bledsoe, are soon assigned to a newly launched submarine, the USS Walrus, and take her to Pearl Harbor to destroy Japanese shipping in the Pacific Ocean. Laura and Jim marry just before the Walrus departs New London.

During their first war patrol in the Walrus, they encounter the Japanese destroyer Akikaze, skippered by Captain Tateo Nakame (nicknamed "Bungo Pete"), who is responsible for sinking a series of American submarines in the Bungo Suido, including the USS Nerka, commanded by Richardson's longtime friend Stocker Kane. After several more war patrols, the Walrus is ordered to return to patrol Bungo Suido where Richardson is wounded in a night-time surface encounter with Bungo Pete. Bledsoe assumes command for the return to Pearl Harbor and Richardson is hospitalized upon arrival. Bledsoe fleets up to command Walrus, thanks in large part to Richardson's personal endorsement to the commodore, who balks at Jim's still comparative youth, and the earlier failed qualification for command exercise back at New London. Bledsoe takes Walrus to Australia for her next three war patrols.

Bledsoe establishes a reputation as an aggressive skipper with an outstanding record for sinkings. Between patrols, Bledsoe has an extramarital affair at Pearl Harbor, causing Richardson anguish for Laura's sake. After heavy drinking during a shore party, Bledsoe reveals to Richardson that he had only pretended to be a loyal friend and subordinate, grudgingly remaining as executive officer during their patrols together "for the crew's sake." However, Richardson's conduct under enemy fire as skipper—and having now personally experienced the weight of command for himself—have finally persuaded him that he had been wrong in doubting Richardson all along. During its next patrol under Bledsoe, however, Bungo Pete makes the Walrus his seventh victim.

During his stint ashore, Richardson works on reliability problems with American torpedoes and receives another command, the new boat USS Eel. When the news of the loss of Bledsoe and the Walrus arrives, Richardson convinces his superiors to let him hunt Bungo Pete in the Eel. A great battle ensues in a raging storm between the Eel, fighting on the surface, and Bungo Pete's special anti-submarine warfare group, which consists of a Q-ship, a Japanese submarine, and the Akikaze. After Richardson sinks all three vessels, he discovers three lifeboats in the vicinity: Realizing that Bungo Pete and his skilled specialists will be rescued to resume hunting U.S. vessels, he intentionally rams the lifeboats.

Soon after, the Eel is detailed to lifeguard duty off Guam, where Richardson saves three aviators, earning him the Medal of Honor. After the war he returns home, hoping to begin a relationship with Laura Bledsoe.
