= Edward L. Beach Jr. =

US Navy officer, author (1918–2002)

Edward Latimer Beach Jr.
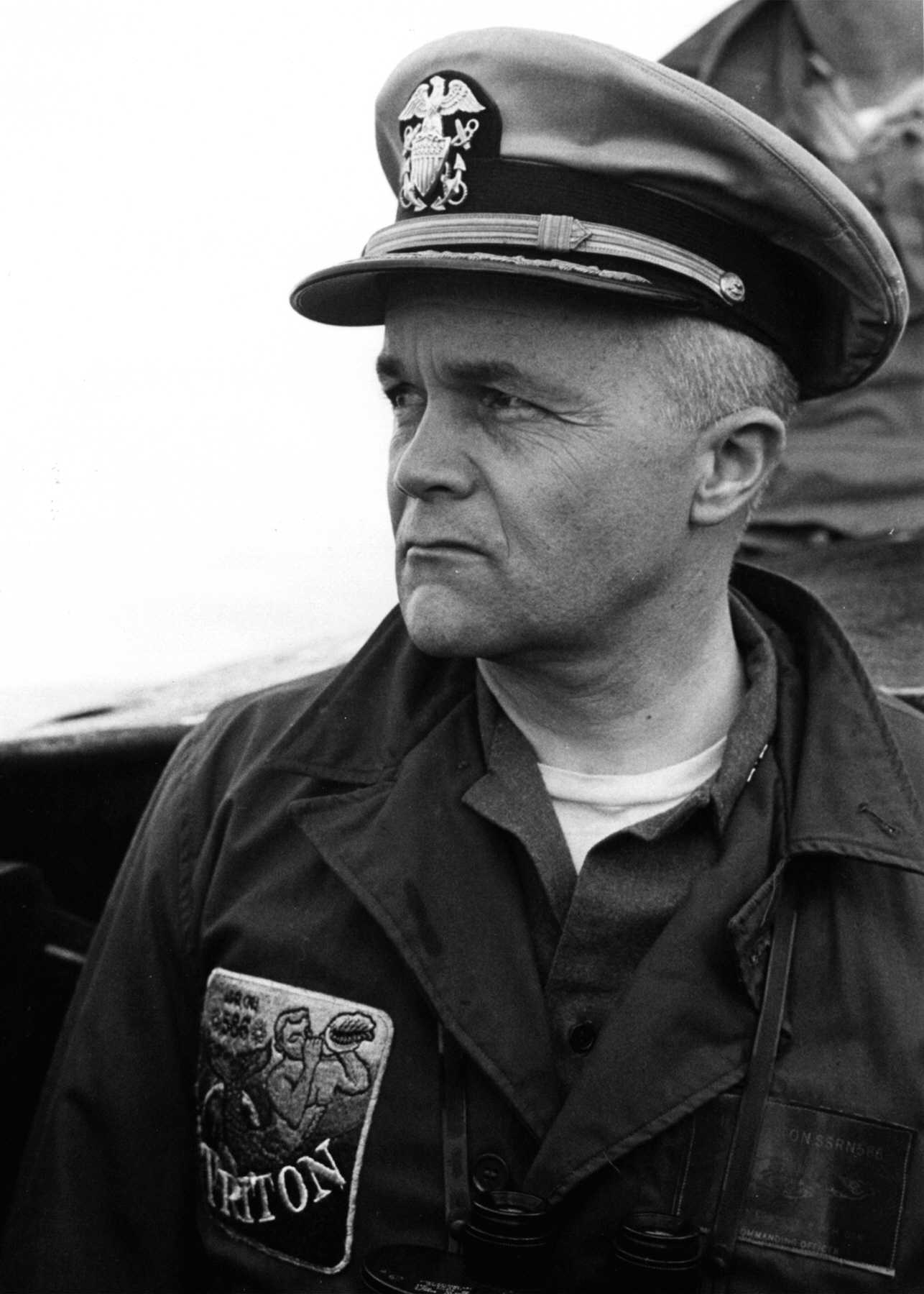
- Edward L. Beach Jr. in 1960
- Born: April 20, 1918; New York City, U.S.
- Died: December 1, 2002 (aged 84); Washington, D.C., U.S.
- Burial place: United States Naval Academy Cemetery
- Military career
- Allegiance: United States of America
- Branch: United States Navy
- Service years: 1939–1966
- Rank: Captain
- Nickname: Ned
- Commands: USS Piper (SS-409); USS Amberjack (SS-522); USS Trigger (SS-564); USS Williamsburg (AGC-369); USS Salamonie (AO-26); USS Triton (SSRN-586); Submarine Squadron 8
- Conflicts: Neutrality Patrol; World War II; Battle of Midway; Cold War
- Awards: Navy Cross; Silver Star (2); Legion of Merit; Bronze Star Medal (2); Magellanic Premium
- Other work: Author, historian

Edward Latimer Beach Jr. (April 20, 1918 – December 1, 2002) was a United States Navy submarine officer and author.

During World War II, he participated in the Battle of Midway and 12 combat patrols, earning 5 decorations for gallantry, including the Navy Cross and three unit citations. After the war, he served as the naval aide to the President of the United States, Dwight D. Eisenhower, and commanded the first submerged circumnavigation.

Beach's best-selling novel, Run Silent, Run Deep, was made into the 1958 film of the same name.

== Family ==
The son of Captain Edward L. Beach Sr. and Alice Fouché Beach, Beach Jr. was born in New York City and raised in Palo Alto, California.

== Naval career ==
Beach was appointed to the U.S. Naval Academy in 1935 by Senator Hiram Johnson of California. Beach served as a regimental commander in his first class year. Beach was named as the midshipman who had done the most to promote naval spirit and loyalty in his regiment when he graduated second out of 576 in his class in 1939.

Beach was initially assigned to the heavy cruiser USS Chester, before joining the newly recommissioned destroyer USS Lea, which participated in the neutrality patrol in the Atlantic, the escort of the German passenger liner Columbus, the initial American occupation of Iceland, and convoy duty in the North Atlantic.

Beach was detached from Lea in September 1941 to undergo accelerated training at the Submarine Training School at the New London Submarine Base in Connecticut. He completed training, graduating first in his class, in December 1941 shortly after the attack on Pearl Harbor.

=== World War II ===
During World War II, Beach served aboard the submarines USS Trigger and USS Tirante, and took command of USS Piper just as the war was ending.

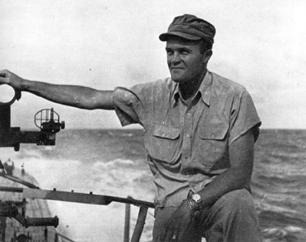
Beach in 1945

After graduating from Submarine School, Beach was assigned to USS Trigger (SS-237), which was commissioned on January 30, 1942. Aboard Trigger Beach held several shipboard positions, including communications officer, engineering officer, navigator, co-approach officer, and executive officer. While aboard Trigger, he participated in the Battle of Midway and served on 10 war patrols. Trigger was awarded the Presidential Unit Citation and the Navy Unit Citation during Beach's time aboard her.

Beach was assigned to the newly commissioned USS Tirante (SS-420) late in 1944. He served as executive officer under Lieutenant Commander George L. Street, who was awarded the Medal of Honor for a making a daring attack in a heavily defended Japanese harbor during Tirante's first war patrol from March 3 to April 26, 1945. Beach received the Navy Cross for heroism during the same patrol and Tirante received the Presidential Unit Citation. The patrol was featured in season 1, episode 11 of the TV series, "The Silent Service", and host and executive producer Thomas M. Dykers interviewed Beach and Street at the end of the episode.

Beach assumed command of USS Piper (SS-409) at Pearl Harbor on June 25, 1945. Piper departed on her third war patrol on July 19 and entered the Sea of Japan on August 13. The war ended on August 14 and Piper was in Japanese waters when the formal surrender was signed on September 2 and started her return to Pearl Harbor the next day.

During World War II, Beach earned 8 decorations for gallantry, including the Navy Cross and three unit citations, and participated in 12 war patrols that damaged or sank 45 enemy vessels.

=== Cold War ===
In December 1945, Beach reported to the Department of the Navy to serve as the personal aide to Vice Admiral Louis E. Denfeld, the chief of the Bureau of Naval Personnel. In March 1947, he was attached to the Atomic Defense Section (OPNAV 36) under Rear Admiral William S. Parsons.

=== USS Amberjack ===
In May 1948, he was given command of USS Amberjack, a GUPPY II modified submarine. Amberjack gained the nickname "Anglejack" because of its pioneering use of steep diving and surfacing angles, which was covered in the January 1950 edition of the National Geographic magazine. During war games, Amberjack photographed the opposing task force's flagship through its periscope and sent the admiral a copy inscribed with "Regards from Ned Beach and the Amberjack."

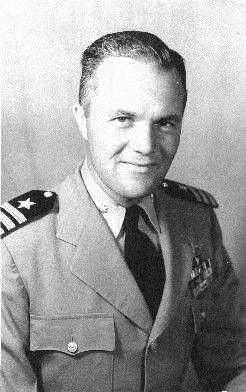
Beach while a naval aide

=== Joint Chiefs of Staff ===
Beach's tour as skipper of Amberjack was abbreviated as he was called to Washington to serve as naval aide to General Omar Bradley, the first Chairman of the Joint Chiefs of Staff, in August 1949. In that post, Beach witnessed first hand the events surrounding the Revolt of the Admirals.

=== USS Trigger ===
Upon completing his tour of duty as Bradley's aide in March 1951, Beach was named prospective commanding officer of the new Trigger (SS-564), then under construction. Upon commissioning of Trigger II, which was named for Trigger (SS-237) lost during World War II, he became commanding officer of the second submarine to be completed in the new Tang-class submarine after World War II.

=== The White House ===
From 1953 to 1957, Beach was naval aide to President Dwight D. Eisenhower. As naval aide Beach was responsible for the management of Camp David, the White House Mess, and for the presidential yacht USS Williamsburg. Because Eisenhower had made a campaign promise to get rid of the presidential yacht, neither the efforts of Beach nor those of Mrs. Eisenhower were successful in dissuading him from that course of action. The elimination of Williamsburg proved to be a bureaucratic hassle for Beach and the Navy Department since Williamsburg was the funnel for all budgets and personnel for Camp David and the White House Mess. While working the White House, Beach volunteered to be the coordinator on the White House staff for all plans to protect the president in case of nuclear attack. Since the Secret Service in 1953 did not deem helicopter travel as safe, evacuating the president on short notice was planned by Beach via the Potomac River, several PT (patrol torpedo) boats and a high speed race down river to meet up with a waiting Navy ship. It was Beach who spearheaded the effort to get First Lady Mamie Eisenhower to christen USS Nautilus, the world's first nuclear-powered submarine, in 1954.

Beach was advanced to the rank of captain on October 1, 1956.

=== USS Salamonie ===
Beach left the White House in January 1957, and assumed command of USS Salamonie, a Cimarron-class fleet replenishment oiler, on March 15. He completed a deployment to the U.S. Sixth Fleet, operating in the Mediterranean Sea, in December 1957.

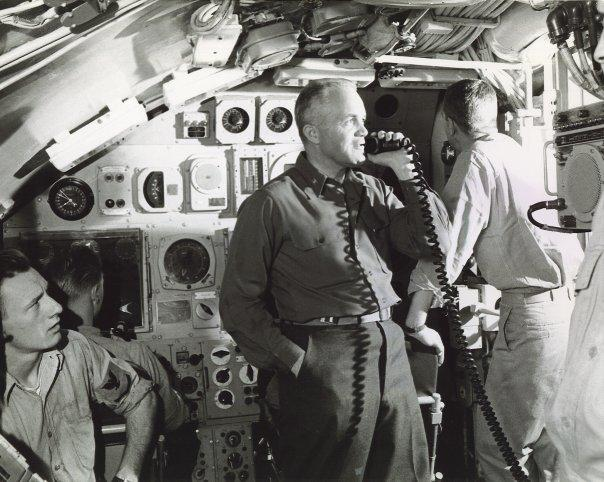
Beach making an announcement to the crew of Triton on February 17, 1960

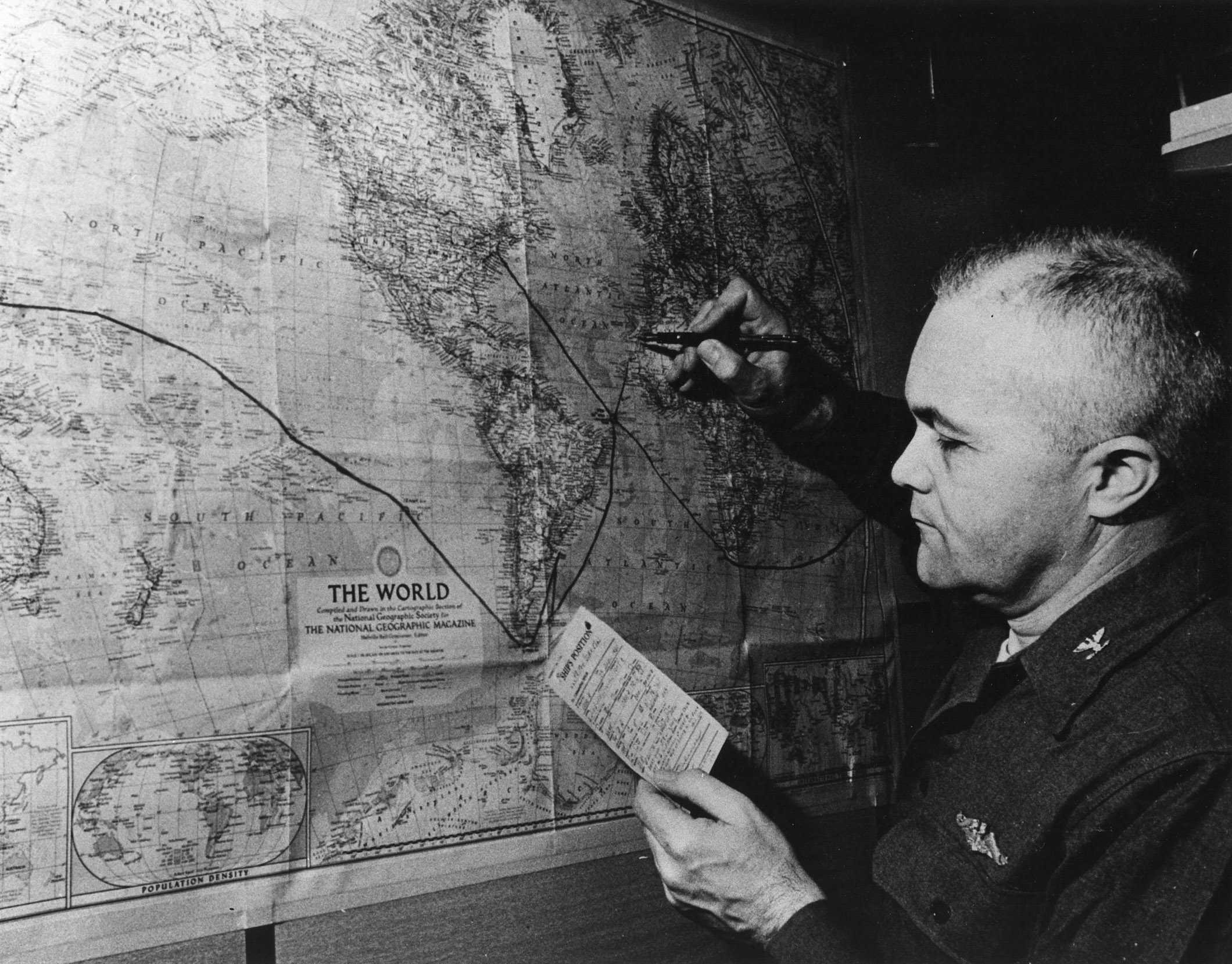
Beach traces the route of the first undersea circumnavigation by Triton in 1960

=== USS Triton ===
In January 1958, he attended the Navy's training program for atomic reactors in order to qualify for his next command, USS Triton, the nation's fifth nuclear-powered submarine.

In November 1959, Beach took command of USS Triton, the only American nuclear-powered submarine to be equipped with two nuclear reactors. Departing New London on what was supposed to have been a "shake-down" cruise in February 1960, Triton began a 1960 circumnavigation of the Earth in 84 days without surfacing, covering over 41,000 statute miles (66,000 km), an unprecedented feat. The route of Triton followed roughly that of Ferdinand Magellan in 1519–1522. The scientific and military significance of the Triton voyage was overshadowed by the U-2 Incident which broke just as USS Triton was returning.

For successfully completing its mission, Triton was awarded the Presidential Unit Citation. At a special White House ceremony, Captain Beach was presented the Legion of Merit by President Eisenhower. Beach wrote about Triton's voyage in his book Around the World Submerged: The Voyage of the Triton, published in 1962.

Following her post-shakedown availability, Triton deployed to European waters with the Second Fleet to participate in NATO exercises against British naval forces led by the aircraft carriers HMS Ark Royal and HMS Hermes under the command of Rear Admiral Sir Charles Madden. This deployment culminated with a port visit to Bremerhaven, West Germany, the first visit by a nuclear-powered ship to a European port.

=== Subron 8, National War College and OpNav ===
After his tour in command of Triton, Beach commanded Submarine Squadron Eight from July 1961 to August 1962. He was next a student at the National War College, where he completed a course of study in July 1963. At the same time he earned a Master of Arts degree in international relations from George Washington University.

In May 1963, Eugene Parks Wilkinson and Beach were in competition for selection to rear admiral, and the board selected Wilkinson with Beach's sincere congratulations.

From July 1963 to December 1966, Beach served in the office of the Chief of Naval Operations (OpNav) preparing annual budget reports for Congress and preparing the Secretary of the Navy (Fred Korth, Paul B. Fay, and Paul H. Nitze) and the Chief of Naval Operations (George W. Anderson Jr. and David L. McDonald) for hearings before Congressional committees.

Beach retired from active duty with the rank of captain in 1966, after 27 years of service.

== Naval War College and Capitol Hill ==
Beach retired from active duty in the Navy in 1966, and was appointed as the Stephen B. Luce Chair of Naval Science at the Naval War College in Newport, Rhode Island – the first person to hold that position. During his tenure he was the editor of the Naval War College Review.

Subsequently, Beach served for seven years as staff director of the United States Senate Republican Policy Committee, and for one year as chief of staff for Senator Jeremiah Denton (R-Alabama).

== Author ==
After World War II, Beach wrote extensively in his spare time, following his father, who was also a career naval officer and author. His first book, Submarine! (1952), was a compilation of accounts of several wartime patrols made by his own as well as other submarines, which Time magazine called "the liveliest and most authentic account of underseas combat to come out of World War II."

In all, Beach published thirteen books, but is best known for his first novel, Run Silent, Run Deep (1955), which appeared on The New York Times Book Review bestseller list for several months. A movie of the same name, based loosely on the novel and starring Clark Gable and Burt Lancaster, was released by United Artists in 1958 (Beach was unhappy with the adaptation). Beach penned two sequels to Run Silent, Run Deep: Dust on the Sea (1972), relating in detail a war patrol by Eel leading a wolfpack, and Cold is the Sea (1978), set in 1961 aboard a nuclear submarine.

In addition to Submarine!, Beach wrote several more books on naval history, including The Wreck of the Memphis (1966); United States Navy: 200 Years (1986), a general history of the Navy; Scapegoats: A Defense of Kimmel and Short at Pearl Harbor (1995); and Salt and Steel: Reflections of a Submariner (1999). Keepers of the Sea (1983) is a pictorial record of the modern navy with photography by Fred J. Maroon. For a number of years Beach was co-editor of Naval Terms Dictionary as that standard reference work passed through several editions. His last work, completed shortly before his death, was to prepare for publication his father's manuscript of his own naval career, From Annapolis to Scapa Flow: The Autobiography of Edward L. Beach Sr (2003).

In addition to his books, Beach was a prolific author of articles and book reviews for periodicals ranging from Blue Book to National Geographic, and Naval History to American Heritage.

=== Bibliography ===
Fiction:

- Run Silent, Run Deep (New York: Holt, Rinehart and Winston, 1955)
- Dust on the Sea (New York: Holt, Rinehart and Winston, 1972)
- Cold is the Sea (New York: Holt, Rinehart and Winston, 1978)

Memoirs:

- From Annapolis to Scapa Flow: The Autobiography of Edward L. Beach Sr. (Annapolis Maryland: Naval Institute Press, 2002) co-authored with his father
- Salt and Steel: Reflections of a Submariner (Annapolis, MD: Naval Institute Press, 1999)

Non-fiction:

- Around the World Submerged: The Voyage of the Triton (New York: Holt, Rinehart and Winston, 1962)
- Keepers of the Sea (photos by Fred J. Maroon) (Annapolis, MD: Naval Institute Press, 1983)
- Naval Terms Dictionary, in collaboration with John V. Noel Jr, 4th edition (Annapolis, MD: Naval Institute Press, 1971)
- Naval Terms Dictionary, in collaboration with John V. Noel Jr, 5th edition (Annapolis, MD: Naval Institute Press, 1978)
- Naval Terms Dictionary, in collaboration with John V. Noel Jr, 6th edition (Annapolis, MD: Naval Institute Press, 1988)
- Scapegoats: A Defense of Kimmel and Short at Pearl Harbor (Annapolis, MD: Naval Institute Press, 1995)
- Submarine! (New York: Holt, Rinehart and Winston, 1952)
- The United States Navy: 200 Years (New York: Henry Holt, 1986)
- The Wreck of the Memphis (New York: Holt, Rinehart and Winston, 1966)

Run Silent, Run Deep and The Wreck of the Memphis were republished in hardcover by the Naval Institute Press as part of its Classics of Naval Literature series while Around the World Submerged, Submarine!, Dust on the Sea, and Cold is the Sea were reprinted in quality paperback editions as part of its Bluejacket Books series

== Family ==
Beach married Ingrid Schenck, daughter of Stanford University professor Hubert G. Schenck and Inga Bergström Schenck, in Palo Alto in 1944. They had four children: Inga-Marie (1945–1948), Edward A. (b. 1948), Hugh S. (b. 1949) and Ingrid Alice (b. 1952).

== Awards and decorations ==
During his service in the United States Navy, Beach was awarded the Navy Cross, the Silver Star with Gold Star in lieu of a second Silver Star, the Legion of Merit, the Bronze Star with a combat Distinguished "V" and Gold Star in lieu of a second Bronze Star Medal with a combat Distinguished "V", Letter of Commendation Ribbon with Gold Star in lieu of second award and "V" device from the Commander in Chief of the Pacific Fleet, three Presidential Unit Citations, the Navy Unit Commendation, American Defense Service Medal with Atlantic Fleet Clasp, the American Campaign Medal, the Asiatic-Pacific Campaign Medal with three engagement stars, the World War II Victory Medal and the National Defense Service Medal with bronze service star in lieu of second award.

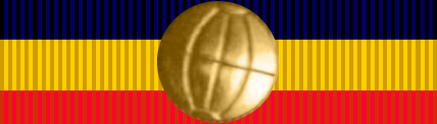

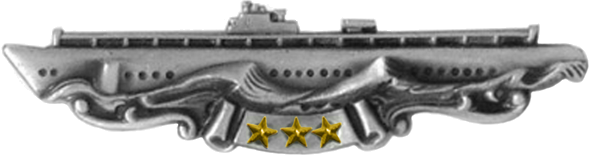

Submarine Warfare insignia
Navy Cross	Silver Star with gold star	Legion of Merit
Bronze Star Medal with "V" device and gold star	Navy Commendation Medal with "V" device and gold star	Presidential Unit Citation with Globe device and two stars
Navy Unit Commendation	American Defense Service Medal with "FLEET" clasp and "A" device	American Campaign Medal
Asiatic-Pacific Campaign Medal with twelve battle stars	World War II Victory Medal	National Defense Service Medal with star
Submarine Combat Patrol insignia

=== Navy Cross ===
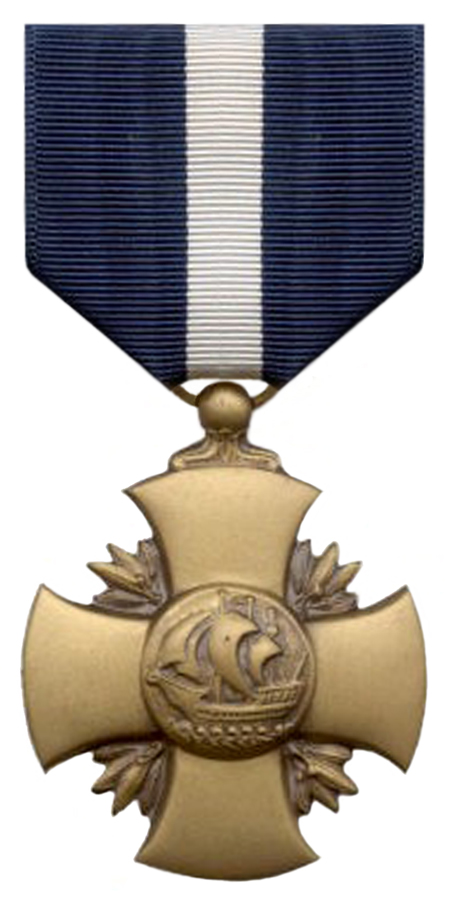

The Navy Cross is presented to Edward Latimer Beach, Lieutenant Commander, United States Navy, for gallantry and intrepidity in action as Executive Officer, Navigator and Assistant Approach Officer on board the U.S.S. TIRANTE (SS-420) on the First War Patrol of that submarine during the period March 3, 1945 to April 25, 1945, in enemy controlled waters of the East China Sea. Lieutenant Commander Edward Beach rendered valiant service to his commanding officer in penetrating mined and shoal-obstructed shallow waters in defiance of hostile shore-based radar stations and aircraft. By his excellent judgment and keen understanding of attack problems, he aided immeasurably in sending torpedoes into targets with deadly accuracy and contributed to the sinking of three Japanese cargo ships, one large transport, a hostile tanker, three patrol frigates, and one lugger, totaling 28,000 tons of shipping vital to the enemy's ability to prosecute the war. Through his experience and sound judgment he assisted in bringing his ship safely back to port. His conduct throughout was an inspiration to his officers and men and in keeping with the highest traditions of the United States Naval Service.

Bureau of Naval Personnel Information Bulletin No. 345 – December 1945

=== Silver Star ===
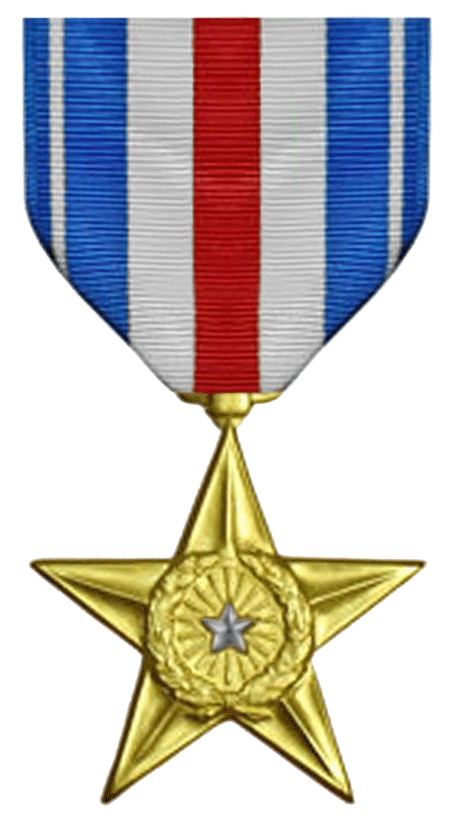

For conspicuous gallantry and intrepidity as Diving Officer on board a United States submarine ... [his] consistent and precise control of depth contributed directly to his vessel's success in destroying or inflicting heavy damage upon enemy shipping and Fleet units. In an attack on a large new Japanese aircraft carrier, his performance of duty under trying circumstances was instrumental in the crippling of this valuable target and in the successful evasion of enemy countermeasures

Gold Star to denote a second Silver Star:

as Executive Officer of a United States submarine during a successful war patrol in enemy-controlled Pacific water ... Undaunted by the enemy's vicious anti-submarine measures, demanding duties on the bridge with vigilance and determination as his submarine attacked important enemy ships. By his technical skill an unwavering devotion to duty in the face of grave personal danger, [he] contributed directly to the sinking of five enemy vessels totaling over 39,000 tons

=== Legion of Merit ===
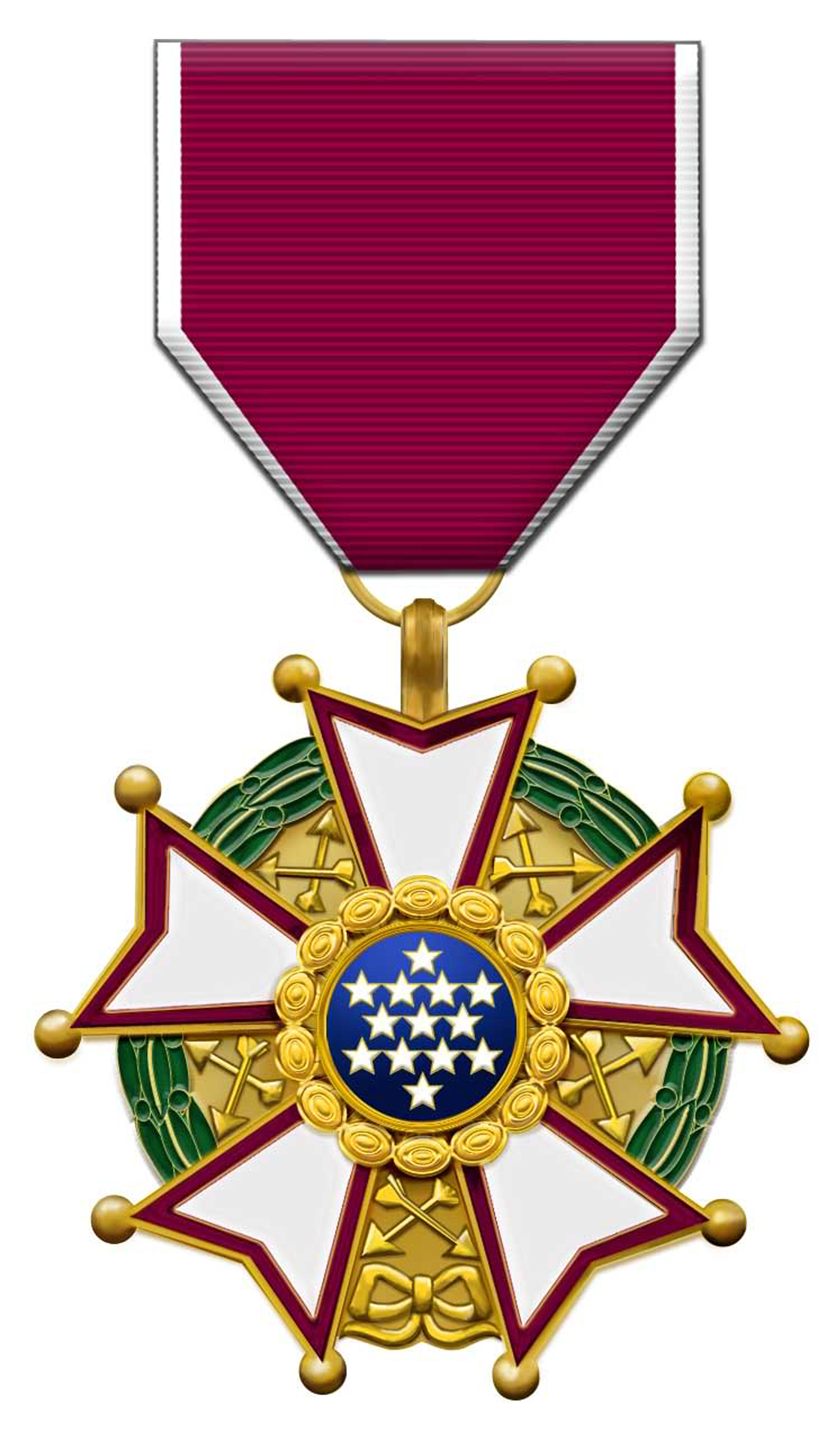

For exceptionally meritorious conduct in the performance of outstanding service while serving on board the U.S.S. TRITON from the 16th of February 1960 to the 10th of May 1960. As Commanding Officer, Captain Edward L. Beach, United States Navy, led his crew with courage, foresight and determination in an unprecedented circumnavigation of the globe, proving man's ability under trying conditions to accomplish prolonged submerged missions as well as testing new and complex equipment in the world's largest submarine. This historic voyage took his ship into strange waters under difficult and frequently unknown conditions, as a result, the TRITON collected much valuable oceanographic information. Captain Edward Beach's sound judgment, masterful leadership, professional skill and devotion to duty were in keeping with the highest traditions of the naval service.

The White House – May 10, 1960

=== Bronze Star, with Combat "V" ===
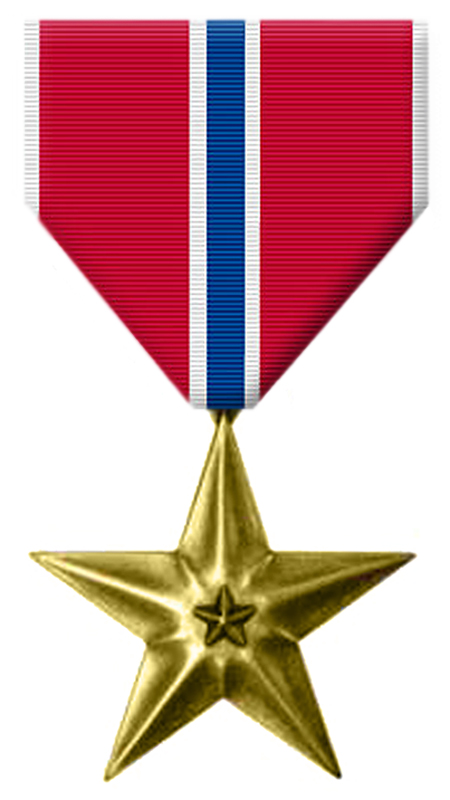

For heroic achievement as Executive Officer and Co-Approach Officer of a United States submarine during a successful and aggressive War Patrol in enemy Japanese-controlled waters ... Despite heavy close-range enemy gunfire [he] rendered invaluable assistance to his commanding officer throughout seven daring attacks upon three large enemy convoys, contributing materially to the sinking of six enemy merchant vessels, totaling over 44,000 tons

Gold Star in lieu of second Bronze Star, with Combat"V":

[For] meritorious service as Commanding Officer of the USS Piper during the Third War Patrol of that vessel in the enemy-controlled waters of the Japan Sea from July 19, 1945, until the cessation of hostilities

=== Letter of commendation ===
For ... meritorious conduct ... as Diving Officer in a U.S. Submarine during a War Patrol of that vessel. His precise control was of valuable assistance to his Commanding Officer in conducting attacks which resulted in the sinking or damaging of enemy vessels totaling over 20,000 tons.

Letter of Commendation Ribbon with Gold Star in lieu of second award and "V" device from the Commander in Chief of the Pacific Fleet:

For distinguishing himself ... in the performance of his duties as Assistant Approach Officer in the USS Trigger during that vessel's Ninth War Patrol, March 23, 1944 to May 15, 1944. His intelligent handling of approach problems, excellent judgment and ability assisted his Commanding Officer considerable in conducting successful attacks

=== Presidential Unit Citation ===
==== USS Trigger ====

For outstanding performance in combat during her Fifth, Sixth, and Seventh War Patrols against the enemy. Employing highly daring and hazardous tactics, the USS Trigger struck at the enemy with consistent aggressiveness, seeking out and pursuing her targets with dogged determination regardless of unfavorable attack conditions. Her exceptionally notable record of severe damage inflicted on hostile shipping and the gallant fighting spirit of her officers and men reflect great credit upon the United States Naval Service.

==== USS Tirante ====

For extraordinary heroism in action ... in the harbor of Quepart Island of the coast of Korea on April 14, 1945. With the crew at surface battle stations the USS Tirante approached the hostile anchorage from the south while within 1200 yards of the coast to complete a reconnoitering circuit of the island ... She penetrated the mine and shoal obstructed waters of the restricted harbor despite numerous patrolling vessels and in defiance of five shore-based radar stations and menacing aircraft. Prepared to fight her way out on the surface if attacked, she went into action, sending two torpedoes with deadly accuracy into a large Japanese ammunition ship and exploding the target in a mountainous and blinding glare of white flame

==== USS Triton ====
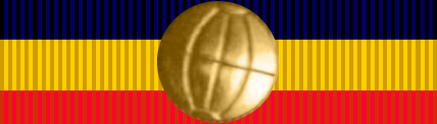

For meritorious achievement from the 16th of February 1960 to the 10th of May 1960. During this period Triton circumnavigated the earth submerged, generally following the route of Magellan's historic voyage. In addition to proving the ability of both crew and nuclear submarine to accomplish a mission which required almost three months of submergence, Triton collected much data of scientific importance. The performance, determination and devotion to duty of TRITON's crew were in keeping with the highest traditions of the naval service.

All members of the crew who made this voyage are authorized to wear the Presidential Unit Citation ribbon with a special clasp in the form of a golden replica of the globe. (see image above)

The White House – May 10, 1960

=== Navy Unit Commendation ===
==== USS Trigger ====

For outstanding heroism in action against enemy Japanese shipping and combatant units during her Ninth War Patrol in the Palau Islands area from March 23 to May 20, 1944. Undaunted by numerous enemy escort vessels and desperately severe anti-submarine measures, the USS Trigger skillfully penetrated convoy screens to reach her targets ... She pressed home daring attacks to leave four freighters and a destroyer a mass of smoke and wreakage ... After seventeen hours of skillful evasion, to resurface and strike again at the enemy

=== Other awards ===
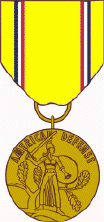
American Defense Service Medal with Atlantic Fleet clasp

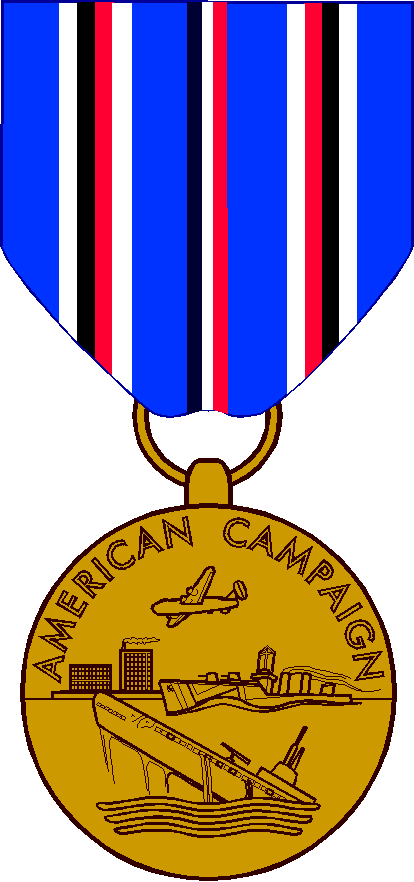
American Campaign Medal

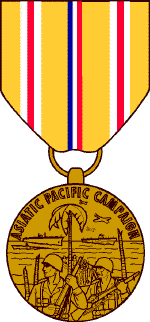
Asiatic-Pacific Campaign Medal with three battle stars

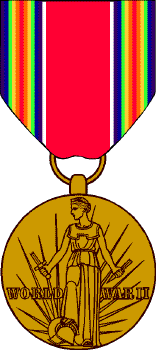
World War II Victory Medal

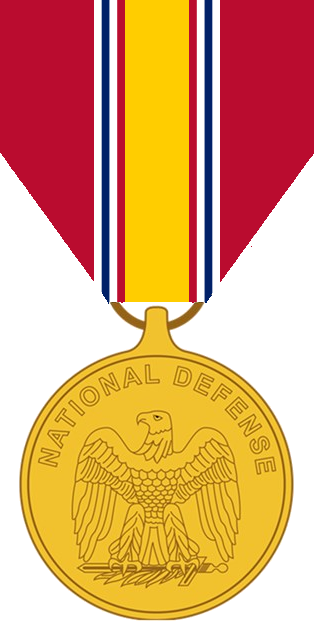
National Defense Service Medal with bronze service star in lieu of second award

== Honors ==
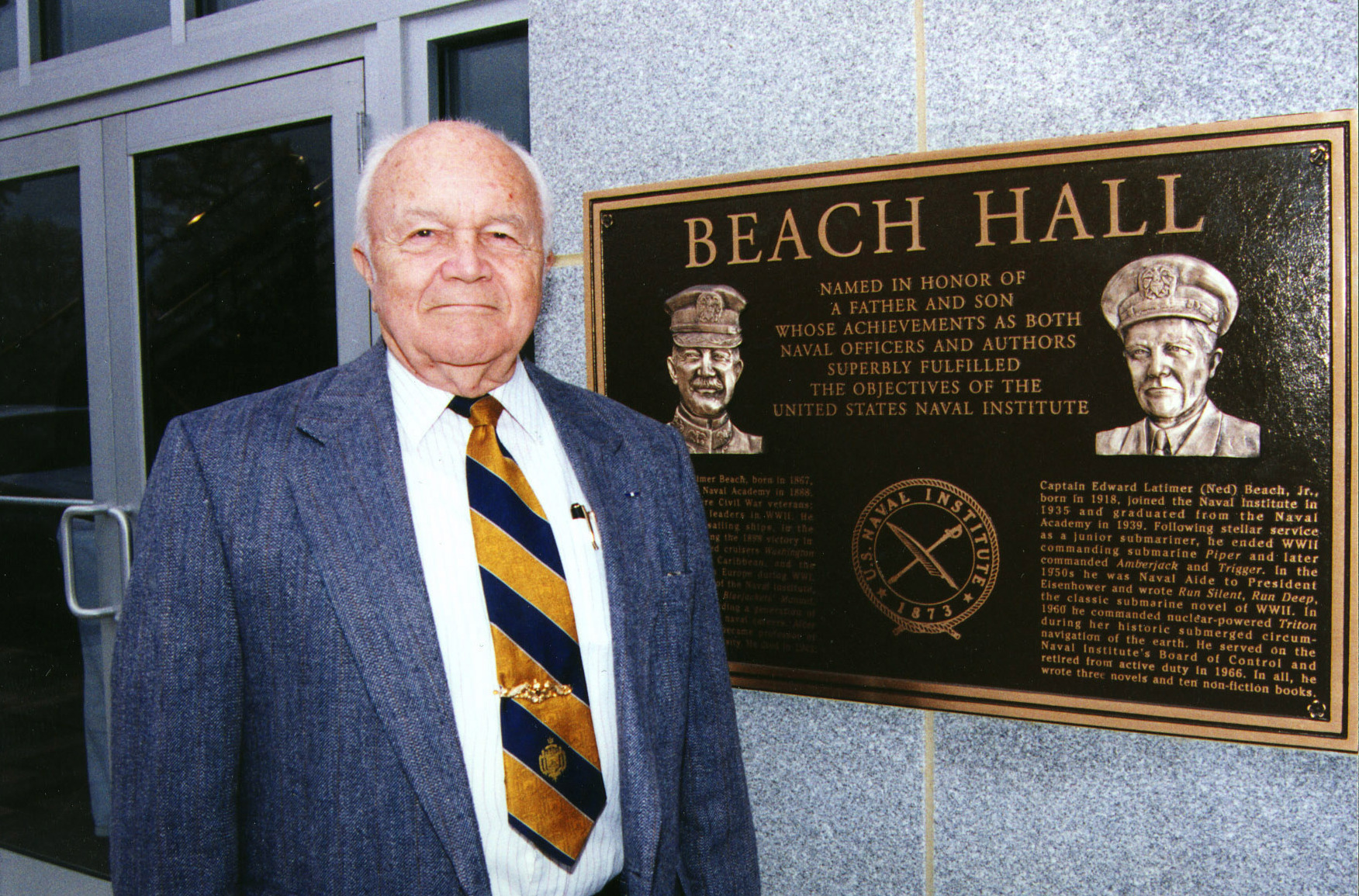
Beach at the 1999 dedication of Beach Hall, the United States Naval Institute's headquarters

- Sword of the Class of 1897 from the United States Naval Academy upon Beach's graduation in 1939.
- Giant of Adventure Award (1960) from the popular men's magazine Argosy, which dubbed Beach the "Magellan of the Deep" for the submerged circumnavigation by USS Triton.
- Honorary Doctor of Science (Sc.D) from the American International College, whose citation reads: "Your most recent exploit in commanding the largest submarine in existence during an historic submerged voyage around the globe has won for you and your crew the admiration of the world you circled."
- Magellanic Premium (1961) from the American Philosophical Society in recognition of the first submerged circumnavigation by the Triton.
- Theodore and Franklin D. Roosevelt Prize in Naval History (1987) from the New York Council of the Navy League, in cooperation with the Roosevelt Institute and the Theodore Roosevelt Association, for his book The United States Navy: 200 Years (Henry Holt, 1986).
- Alfred Thayer Mahan Award for Literary Achievement (1980; 2000) from the Navy League.
- The Naval Historical Foundation History Prize has been renamed the Captain Edward L. Beach Prize.
- The Beach Award for non-technical writing or documentation that promotes personal submarines presented by the Personal Submersible Organization (PSUBS.ORG) is named in Beach's honor.
- Beach Hall, the United States Naval Institute's headquarters on the grounds of the United States Naval Academy in Annapolis, Maryland, is named in honor of both Captains Beach. Beach Jr., is buried in front of the entrance to Beach Hall, close to the bank of the Severn River of Maryland.
- National Museum of the United States Navy included Beach, USS Triton, and Operation Sandblast as part of the Technology for the Nuclear Age: Nuclear Propulsion display for its Cold War exhibit.
- Samuel Eliot Morison Award for Naval Literature (1999) for Salt and Steel: Reflections of a Submariner

== Legacy ==
Author Tom Clancy summarized Beach's accomplishments and contributions when he wrote:

Ned loved the Navy as a man might love his own family. For the Navy was his family, the junior officers he trained and the enlisted men who did so much of the hand-labor in the boats. He served with distinction approaching perfection and, like his father, would then write about the things he'd seen and done ... More than once I spoke with him about the psychological aspects of combat, and every time he told me what I needed to know, always from his own rich experiences. Ned was a serious student of history – he wrote several splendid books on this subject – and of human nature. What he didn't know had never happened.

Ed Offley of DefenseWatch wrote:

Beach once told an interviewer, "What is there about the Navy? To me, it's always been a tremendous feeling that I am part of an organization that's much bigger than I am."

The submariner was inaccurate. It is sailors like Capt. Edward L. Beach Jr. – who died on December 1 at the age of 84 – who make institutions like the Navy bigger and greater than they otherwise would be.
